= List of fishes of Hawaii =

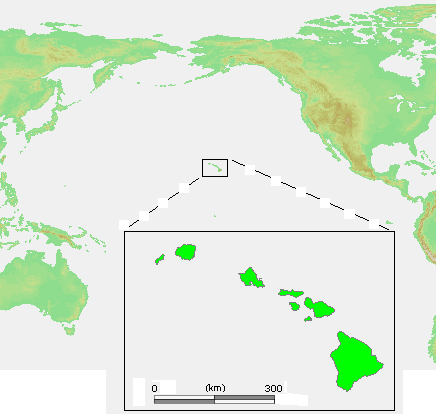
Eight main islands in the Hawaiian archipelago

The Hawaiian archipelago is in the central North Pacific Ocean, southwest of the continental United States, southeast of Japan, and northeast of Australia. Politically, the islands are part of the U.S. state of Hawaii. The state encompasses nearly the entire volcanic Hawaiian Island chain, comprising hundreds of islands spread over 1,500 miles (2,400 km).

At the southeastern end of the archipelago, the eight "main islands" are (from the northwest to southeast) Niʻihau, Kauaʻi, Oʻahu, Molokaʻi, Lānaʻi, Kahoʻolawe, Maui, and Hawaiʻi. The Northwestern Hawaiian Islands include many atolls, and reefs. Due to Hawaii's isolation 30% of the fish are endemic (unique to the island chain).

The Hawaiian Islands comprise 137 islands and atolls, with a land area of 6,423.4 square miles (16,636.5 km^{2}). This archipelago and its oceans are physiographically and ethnologically part of the Polynesian subregion of Oceania.

The climate of Hawaii is typical for a tropical area, although temperatures and humidity tend to be a bit less extreme than other tropical locales due to the constant trade winds blowing from the east.

The surrounding waters are affected by effluents generated and released from the islands themselves. Floating plastic garbage is a problem, and refuse from the Great Pacific Garbage Patch affects its beaches. Other pressures on Hawaii's fish population are its fishing industries and whaling until IWC's moratorium in 1986. In the last century, some commercially fished stocks have decreased by 80–85%.

Due to its isolation, very few native freshwater fish species are found in Hawaii, and none are entirely restricted to freshwater (all are either anadromous, or also found in brackish and marine water in their adult stage).

The seven native fish species regularly seen in fresh water are the flagtail (Kuhlia xenura), the mullet (Mugil cephalus), the gobies (Awaous stamineus, Lentipes concolor, Sicyopterus stimpsoni and Stenogobius hawaiiensis), and the sleeper goby (Eleotris sandwicensis). Three of the gobies, A. stamineus, L. concolor and S. stimpsoni, are famous for their ability to climb waterfalls to reach higher sections of freshwater streams. Several other species have been introduced to the freshwater habitats of Hawaii and some of these are invasive.

== Species of fish ==
Hawaiian language name	Common name	Genus	Scientific name	Family	Common family name	Endemic
Fisher's angelfish	Fisher's angelfish	Centropyge	C. fisheri	Pomacanthidae	Angelfish	N
Flame angelfish	Flame angelfish	Centropyge	C. loriculus	Pomacanthidae	Angelfish	N
Japanese angelfish	Japanese angelfish	Centropyge	C. interrupta	Pomacanthidae	Angelfish	N
Masked angelfish	Masked angelfish	Genicanthus	G. personatus	Pomacanthidae	Angelfish	Y
Nahacky's angelfish	Nahacky angelfish	Centropyge	C. nahackyi	Pomacanthidae	Angelfish	Y
Whiskered boarfish (striped boarfish)	Whiskered boarfish	Evistias	E. acutirostris	Pomacanthidae	Angelfish	Y
Kākū	Barracuda	Sphyraena	S. barracuda	Sphyraenidae	Barracuda	N
Blackfin barracuda	Blackfin barracuda	Sphyraena	S. qenie	Sphyraenidae	Barracuda	Y
Kaweleʻā	Japanese barracuda	Sphyraena	S. helleri	Sphyraenidae	Barracuda	N
Deepsea moi	Beardfish	Polymixia	P. berndti	Polymixiidae	Beardfish	N
ʻAweoweo	Common bigeye	Heteropriacanthus	H. cruentatus	Priacanthidae	Bigeye	N
ʻAweoweo	Hawaiian bigeye	Priacanthus	P. meeki	Priacanthidae	Bigeye	Y
Lanternshark	Hawaiian lanternshark	Etmopterus	E. villosus	Etmopteridae	Shark	Y
Auweke	Moana kali	Parupeneus	P. cyclostomus	Priacanthidae	Bigeye	N
Pāoʻo	Hump-headed blenny	Blenniella	B. gibbifrons	Blenniidae	Blenny	N
Ewa fang blenny	Ewa fang blenny	Plagiotremus	P. ewaensis	Blenniidae	Blenny	Y
Pāoʻo	Gargantuan blenny	Cirripectes	C. obscurus	Blenniidae	Blenny	Y
Gosline's fang blenny	Gosline's fang blenny	Plagiotremus	P. goslinei	Blenniidae	Blenny	Y
Pāoʻo	Hawaiian zebra blenny	Istiblennius	I. zebra	Blenniidae	Blenny	Y
Mangrove blenny	Mangrove blenny	Omobranchus	O. obliquus	Blenniidae	Blenny	N
Pāoʻo	Marblehead blenny	Entomacrodus	E. marmoratus	Blenniidae	Blenny	Y
Pāoʻo	Scarface blenny	Cirripectes	C. vanderbilti	Blenniidae	Blenny	Y
Pāoʻo ʻ kauila	Spotted coral blenny	Exallias	E. brevis	Blenniidae	Blenny	N
Pāoʻo	Strasburg's blenny	Entomacrodus	E. strasburgi	Blenniidae	Blenny	Y
Bandit angelfish	Bandit angelfish	Apolemichthys	A. arcuatus	Pentacerotidae	Boarfish	N
ʻOio	Longjaw bonefish	Albula	A. virgata	Albulidae	Bonefish	Y
ʻOio	Shortjaw bonefish	Albula	A. glossodonta	Albulidae	Bonefish	N
Pahu	Spiny cowfish	Lactoria	L. fornasini	Ostraciidae	Boxfish	N
Moa (Pahu)	Spotted boxfish	Ostracion	O. meleagris	Ostraciidae	Boxfish	N
Makukana (Pahu)	Thornback cowfish	Lactoria	L. diaphana	Ostraciidae	Boxfish	N
Pahu	Whitley's boxfish	Ostracion	O. whitleyi	Ostraciidae	Boxfish	N
Lauwiliwili nukunuku ʻoiʻoi	Big longnose butterflyfish	Forcipiger	F. longirostris	Chaetodontidae	Butterflyfish	N
Blacklip butterflyfish	Sunburst butterflyfish	Chaetodon	C. kleinii	Chaetodontidae	Butterflyfish	N
Kīkākapu	Bluestripe butterflyfish	Chaetodon	C. fremblii	Chaetodontidae	Butterflyfish	Y
Chevron butterflyfish	Chevron butterflyfish	Chaetodon	C. trifascialis	Chaetodontidae	Butterflyfish	N
Lauwiliwili nukunuku ʻoiʻoi	Yellow longnose butterflyfish	Forcipiger	F. flavissimus	Chaetodontidae	Butterflyfish	N
Lauhau	Fourspot butterflyfish	Chaetodon	C. quadrimaculatus	Chaetodontidae	Butterflyfish	N
Kīkākapu	Lined butterflyfish	Chaetodon	C. lineolatus	Chaetodontidae	Butterflyfish	N
Lauwiliwili	Milletseed butterflyfish	Chaetodon	C. miliaris	Chaetodontidae	Butterflyfish	Y
Kīkākapu	Pebbled butterflyfish	Chaetodon	C. multicinctus	Chaetodontidae	Butterflyfish	Y
Kīkākapu	Ornate butterflyfish	Chaetodon	C. ornatissimus	Chaetodontidae	Butterflyfish	N
Kapuhili	Oval butterflyfish	Chaetodon	C. lunulatus	Chaetodontidae	Butterflyfish	N
Pennant butterflyfish	Schooling bannerfish	Heniochus	H. diphreutes	Chaetodontidae	Butterflyfish	N
Pyramid butterflyfish	Pyramid butterflyfish	Hemitaurichthys	H. polylepis	Chaetodontidae	Butterflyfish	N
Kīkākapu	Raccoon butterflyfish	Chaetodon	C. linula	Chaetodontidae	Butterflyfish	N
Reticulated butterflyfish	Mailed butterflyfish	Chaetodon	C. reticulatus	Chaetodontidae	Butterflyfish	N
Kīkākapu	Speckled butterflyfish	Chaetodon	C. citrinellus	Chaetodontidae	Butterflyfish	N
Speckled butterflyfish	Speckled butterflyfish	Chaetodon	C. ephippium	Chaetodontidae	Butterflyfish	Y
Teardrop butterflyfish	Teardrop butterflyfish	Chaetodon	C. unimaculatus	Chaetodontidae	Butterflyfish	N
Thompson's butterflyfish	Thompson's butterflyfish	Hemitaurichthys	H. thompsoni	Chaetodontidae	Butterflyfish	N
Kīkākapu	Threadfin butterflyfish	Chaetodon	C. auriga	Chaetodontidae	Butterflyfish	N
Tinker's butterflyfish	Tinker's butterflyfish	Chaetodon	C. tinkeri	Chaetodontidae	Butterflyfish	N
Viviparous brotula	Viviparous brotula	Grammonus	G. nagaredai	Bythitidae	Viviparous brotulas	N
ʻUpāpalu	Bandfin cardinalfish	Pristiapogon	P. taeniopterus	Apogonidae	Cardinalfishes	N
ʻUpāpalu	Bay cardinalfish	Foa	F. brachygramma	Apogonidae	Cardinalfishes	Y
ʻUpāpalu	Deetsie's cardinalfish	Apogon	A. deetsie	Apogonidae	Cardinalfishes	N
ʻUpāpalu	Evermann's cardinalfish	Zapogon	Z. evermanni	Apogonidae	Cardinalfishes	N
ʻUpāpalu	Hawaiian ruby cardinalfish	Apogon	A. erythrinus	Apogonidae	Cardinalfishes	Y
ʻUpāpalu	Hawaiian spotted cardinalfish	Ostorhinchus	O. maculiferus	Apogonidae	Cardinalfishes	Y
ʻUpāpalu	Iridescent cardinalfish	Pristiapogon	P. kallopterus	Apogonidae	Cardinalfishes	N
ʻUpāpalu	Transparent cardinalfish	Pseudamiops	P. diaphanes	Apogonidae	Cardinalfishes	Y
ʻUpāpalu	Waikīkī cardinalfish	Apogonichthys	A. perdix	Apogonidae	Cardinalfishes	N
Agile chromis	Agile chromis	Chromis	C. agilis	Pomacentridae	Chromis	N
Blackfin chromis	Blackfin chromis	Chromis	C. vanderbilti	Pomacentridae	Chromis	N
Chocolate dip chromis	Chocolate dip chromis	Pycnochromis	P. hanui	Pomacentridae	Chromis	Y
ʻĀloʻiloʻi	Hawaiian dascyllus	Dascyllus	D. albisella	Pomacentridae	Chromis	N
Midget chromis	Midget chromis	Chromis	C. acares	Pomacentridae	Chromis	N
Oval chromis	Oval chromis	Chromis	C. ovalis	Pomacentridae	Chromis	Y
Threespot chromis	Threespot chromis	Chromis	C. verater	Pomacentridae	Chromis	Y
White-tail chromis	White-tail chromis	Chromis	C. leucura	Pomacentridae	Chromis	N
Barred conger	Barred conger	Ariosoma	A. fasciatus	Congridae	Conger eel	N
Puhi ūhā	Hawaiian conger	Conger	C. marginatus	Congridae	Conger eel	Y
Hawaiian garden eel	Hawaiian garden eel	Gorgasia	G. hawaiiensis	Congridae	Conger eel	Y
Large-eye conger	Large-eye conger	Ariosoma	A. marginatum	Congridae	Conger eel	Y
Puhiuha	White eel	Conger	C. cinereus	Congridae	Conger eel	N
Nūnū	Cornetfish	Fistularia	F. commersonii	Fistulariidae	Cornetfish	N
Hawaiian coral croucher	Hawaiian coral croucher	Caracanthus	C. typicus	Caracanthidae	Croucher	Y
Puhi palahoana	Bearded cusk eel/many-whiskered brotula	Brotula	B. multibarbata	Ophidiidae	Cusk eel	N
Blue-eye damselfish	Blue-eye damselfish	Plectroglyphidodon	P. johnstonianus	Pomacentridae	Damselfish	N
Bright-eye damselfish	Bright-eye damselfish	Plectroglyphidodon	P. imparipennis	Pomacentridae	Damselfish	N
Kupīpī	Gray damselfish	Abudefduf	A. sordidus	Pomacentridae	Damselfish	N
Hawaiian gregory	Hawaiian gregory	Stegastes	S. marginatus	Pomacentridae	Damselfish	Y
Hawaiian rock damselfish	Hawaiian rock damselfish	Plectroglyphidodon	P. sindonis	Pomacentridae	Damselfish	Y
Mamo	Hawaiian sergeant major damsel	Abudefduf	A. abdominalis	Pomacentridae	Damselfish	Y
Kupīpī	Indo-Pacific damselfish	Abudefduf	A. vaigiensis	Pomacentridae	Damselfish	N
Phoenix island damselfish	Phoenix island damselfish	Plectroglyphidodon	P. phoenixensis	Pomacentridae	Damselfish	N
Curious wormfish	Curious wormfish	Gunnellichthys	G. curiosus	Microdesmidae	Dartfish	N
Fire dartfish	Fire dartfish	Nemateleotris	N. magnifica	Ptereleotridae	Dartfish	N
Indigo dartfish	Indigo dartfish	Ptereleotris	P. heteroptera	Ptereleotridae	Dartfish	N
Mahi-mahi	Dolphinfish	Coryphaena	C. hippurus	Coryphaenidae	Dolphinfish	N
Little mahimahi	Pompano dolphinfish	Coryphaena	C. equiselis	Coryphaenidae	Dolphinfish	N
Exclamation point dragonet	Exclamation point dragonet	Synchiropus	S. corallinus	Callionymidae	Dragonet	N
Fringelip dragonet	Hawaiian wonder dragonet	Draculo	D. pogognathus	Callionymidae	Dragonet	Y
Hawaiian triplefin	Hawaiian triplefin	Enneapterygius	E. atriceps	Tripterygiidae	Dragonet	Y
Longtail dragonet	Longtail dragonet	Callionymus	C. decoratus	Callionymidae	Dragonet	N
Rosy dragonet	Rosy dragonet	Synchiropus	S. rosulentus	Callionymidae	Dragonet	Y
Haielepo (hīhīmanu)	Spotted eagle ray	Aetobatus	A. narinari	Myliobatidae	Eagle ray	N
Nehu	Hawaiian anchovy	Encrasicholina	E. purpurea	Engraulidae	Anchovy	Y
ʻŌʻili	Barred filefish	Cantherhines	C. dumerilii	Monacanthidae	Filefish	N
Oilipa	Bluelined leather jacket	Osbeckia	O. scripta	Monacanthidae	Filefish	N
ʻŌʻili ʻūwi ʻūwi	Hawaiian fantail filefish	Pervagor	P. spilosoma	Monacanthidae	Filefish	Y
Loulu	Scrawled filefish	Aluterus	A. scriptus	Monacanthidae	Filefish	N
ʻŌʻili	Shy filefish	Cantherhines	C. verecundus	Monacanthidae	Filefish	Y
ʻŌʻili lepa	Squaretail filefish	Cantherhines	C. sandwichiensis	Monacanthidae	Filefish	N
Unicorn filefish	Unicorn filefish	Aluterus	A. monoceros	Monacanthidae	Filefish	N
ʻŌʻili	Yellowtail filefish	Pervagor	P. aspricaudus	Monacanthidae	Filefish	N
Āholehole	Hawaiian flagtail	Kuhlia	K. xenura	Kuhliidae	Flagtail	Y
Āholehole	Zebrahead flagtail	Kuhlia	K. sandvicensis	Kuhliidae	Flagtail	N
Malolo	Flyingfish	Parexocoetus	P. brachypterus	Exocoetidae	Flying fish	N
Ioloaʻu (pinao)	Oriental flying gurnard	Dactyloptena	D. orientalis	Dactylopteridae	Flying gurnards	N
Commerson's frogfish	Commerson's frogfish	Antennarius	A. commerson	Antennariidae	Frogfish	N
Hawaiian freckled frogfish	Hawaiian freckled frogfish	Abantennarius	A. drombus	Antennariidae	Frogfish	Y
Painted frogfish	Painted frogfish	Antennarius	A. pictus	Antennariidae	Frogfish	N
Reticulated frogfish	Reticulated frogfish	Antennatus	A. tuberosus	Antennariidae	Frogfish	N
Sargassum frogfish	Sargassum frogfish	Histrio	H. histrio	Antennariidae	Frogfish	N
Warty frogfish	Warty frogfish	Antennarius	A. maculatus	Antennariidae	Frogfish	N
Walu	Oilfish	Ruvettus	R. pretiosus	Gempylidae	Snake mackerel	N
Weke pueo	Bandtail goatfish	Upeneus	U. arge	Mullidae	Goatfish	N
Munu	Doublebar goatfish	Parupeneus	P. trifasciatus	Mullidae	Goatfish	N
Munu	Island goatfish	Parupeneus	P. insularis	Mullidae	Goatfish	N
Moano	Manybar goatfish	Parupeneus	P. multifasciatus	Mullidae	Goatfish	N
Weke moelua (weke ʻula	Pfluger's goatfish	Mulloidichthys	M. pfluegeri	Mullidae	Goatfish	N
Moano	Sidespot goatfish	Parupeneus	P. pleurostigma	Mullidae	Goatfish	N
Wekeʻā	Square-spot goatfish/Yellowstripe goatfish	Mulloidichthys	M. flavolineatus	Mullidae	Goatfish	N
Kūmū	White saddle goatfish	Parupeneus	P. porphyreus	Mullidae	Goatfish	Y
Wekeʻula	Yellowfin goatfish	Mulloidichthys	M. vanicolensis	Mullidae	Goatfish	N
Barred tide pool goby	Barred tidepool goby	Kelloggella	K. oligolepis	Gobiidae	Goby	N
Black coral goby	Black coral goby	Bryaninops	B. tigris	Gobiidae	Goby	N
ʻOʻoopuʻohune	Cheekscaled frill goby	Bathygobius	B. cotticeps	Gobiidae	Goby	N
Cloudy goby	Cloudy goby	Opua	O. nephodes	Gobiidae	Goby	N
ʻOʻoopuʻohune	Cocos island frill goby	Bathygobius	B. cocosensis	Gobiidae	Goby	N
Divine pygmy goby	Divine pygmy goby	Eviota	E. epiphanes	Gobiidae	Goby	N
Eyebar goby	Eyebar goby	Gnatholepis	G. anjerensis	Gobiidae	Goby	N
Golden green goby	Golden green goby	Priolepis	P. aureoviridis	Gobiidae	Goby	N
Gorgonian goby	Gorgonian goby	Bryaninops	B. amplus	Gobiidae	Goby	N
Halfspotted goby	Halfspotted goby	Asterropteryx	A. semipunctata	Gobiidae	Goby	N
Hawaiian shrimp goby	Hawaiian shrimp goby	Psilogobius	P. mainlandi	Gobiidae	Goby	N
Michel's ghost goby	Michel's ghost goby	Pleurosicya	P. micheli	Gobiidae	Goby	N
Shoulderspot goby	Shoulderspot goby	Gnatholepis	G. cauerensis	Gobiidae	Goby	N
Taylor's dwarf goby	Taylor's dwarf goby	Trimma	T. taylori	Gobiidae	Goby	N
Twospot sand goby	Twospot sand goby	Fusigobius	F. duospilus	Gobiidae	Goby	N
ʻOʻoopuʻohune	Whitespotted frill goby	Bathygobius	B. coalitus	Gobiidae	Goby	N
Wire coral goby	Wire coral goby	Bryaninops	B. yongei	Gobiidae	Goby	N
Bicolor anthias	Bicolor anthias	Pseudanthias	P. bicolor	Serranidae	Grouper	N
Earle's splitfin anthias	Earle's splitfin anthias	Luzonichthys	L. earlei	Serranidae	Grouper	N
Elegant anthias	Elegant anthias	Caprodon	C. unicolor	Serranidae	Grouper	Y
Giant grouper	Giant grouper	Epinephelus	E. lanceolatus	Serranidae	Grouper	N
Hapuʻupuʻu	Hawaiian black grouper	Epinephelus	E. quernus	Serranidae	Grouper	Y
Hawaiian yellow anthias	Hawaiian yellow anthias	Odontanthias	O. fuscipinnis	Serranidae	Grouper	Y
Roi	Blue-spotted grouper	Cephalopholis	C. argus	Serranidae	Grouper	N
Sunset basslet	Sunset basslet		L. aurora	Serranidae	Grouper	Y
Hawaiian longfin anthias	Sunset basslet	Pseudanthias	P. hawaiiensis	Serranidae	Grouper	Y
Thompson's anthias	Thompson's anthias	Pseudanthias	P. thompsoni	Serranidae	Grouper	Y
Iheihe	Acute halfbeak	Hyporhamphus	H. acutus	Hemiramphidae	Halfbeak	N
Iheihe	Halfbeak	Hyporhamphus	H. pacificus	Hemiramphidae	Halfbeak	N
Iheihe	Polynesian halfbeak	Hemiramphus	H. depauperatus	Hemiramphidae	Halfbeak	N
Arc-eye hawkfish	Arc-eye hawkfish	Paracirrhites	P. arcatus	Cirrhitidae	Hawkfishes	N
Hilu pilikoʻa	Blackside hawkfish	Paracirrhites	P. forsteri	Cirrhitidae	Hawkfishes	N
Longnose hawkfish	Longnose hawkfish	Oxycirrhites	O. typus	Cirrhitidae	Hawkfishes	N
Pilikoʻa	Redbarred hawkfish	Cirrhitops	C. fasciatus	Cirrhitidae	Hawkfishes	Y
Poʻopaʻa	Stocky hawkfish	Cirrhitus	C. pinnulatis	Cirrhitidae	Hawkfishes	N
Twospot hawkfish	Twospot hawkfish	Amblycirrhitus	A. bimacula	Cirrhitidae	Hawkfishes	N
Piha	Delicate roundherring	Spratelloides	S. delicatulus	Clupeidae	Herring	N
Pietschmann's infantfish	Pietschmann's infantfish	Schindleria	S. pietschmanni	Schindleriidae	Infantfish	N
Schindler's infantfish	Schindler's infantfish	Schindleria	S. praematura	Schindleriidae	Infantfish	N
Ulua kihikihi	Threadfin jack	Alectis	A. ciliaris	Carangidae	Jacks	N
Kāhala	Greater Amberjack	Seriola	S. dumerili	Carangidae	Jacks	N
Ulua	Barred jack	Carangoides	C. ferdau	Carangidae	Jacks	N
Akule (Hahalalu)	Bigeye scad	Selar	S. crumenophthalmus	Carangidae	Jacks	N
Lai	Doublespotted queenfish	Scomberoides	S. lysan	Carangidae	Jacks	N
Ulua	Island jack	Carangoides	C. orthogrammus	Carangidae	Jacks	N
Ulua lāuli	Whitetongue jack	Uraspis	U. helvola	Carangidae	Jacks	Y
Barred knifejaw	Barred knifejaw	Oplegnathus	O. fasciatus	Oplegnathidae	Knifejaw	N
Spotted knifejaw	Spotted knifejaw	Oplegnathus	O. punctatus	Oplegnathidae	Knifejaw	N
Awaʻawa	Ladyfish	Elops	E. hawaiensis	Elopidae	Ladyfish	N
Pakiʻi	Flowery flounder	Bothus	B. mancus	Bothidae	Left-eyed flounder	N
Pakiʻi	Hawaiian dwarf flounder	Engyprosopon	E. hawaiiensis	Bothidae	Left-eyed flounder	N
Pakiʻi	Panther flounder	Bothus	B. pantherinus	Bothidae	Left-eyed flounder	N
ʻUlae	Clearfin lizardfish	Synodus	S. ulae	Synodontidae	Lizardfish	N
ʻUlae	Hawaiian lizardfish	Synodus	S. dermatogenys	Synodontidae	Lizardfish	N
Weleʻā	Nearsighted lizardfish	Trachinocephalus	T. myops	Synodontidae	Lizardfish	N
ʻUlae	Orangemouth lizardfish	Saurida	S. flamma	Synodontidae	Lizardfish	N
ʻUlae	Redmarbled lizardfish	Synodus	S. rubromarmoratus	Synodontidae	Lizardfish	N
ʻUlae	Reef lizardfish	Synodus	S. ulae	Synodontidae	Lizardfish	N
ʻUlae	Slender lizardfish	Saurida	S. gracilis	Synodontidae	Lizardfish	N
ʻUlae	Twospot lizardfish	Synodus	S. binotatus	Synodontidae	Lizardfish	N
ʻUlae	Twospot lizardfish	Synodus	S. lobeli	Synodontidae	Lizardfish	N
Aʻu	Black marlin	Makaira	M. indica	Istiophoridae	Marlin	N
Aʻu	Atlantic blue marlin	Makaira	M. nigricans	Istiophoridae	Marlin	N
Aʻu lepe	Sailfish	Istiophorus	I. platypterus	Istiophoridae	Marlin	N
Hebe	Short-nosed spearfish	Tetrapturus	T. angustirostris	Istiophoridae	Marlin	N
Striped marlin	Striped marlin	Tetrapturus	T. audax	Istiophoridae	Marlin	N
Awa	Milkfish	Chanos	C. chanos	Chanidae	Milkfish	N
Makua	Ocean sunfish	Mola	M. mola	Molidae	Mola	N
Opah	Moonfish	Lampris	L. guttatus	Lampridae	Moonfish	N
Kihikihi	Moorish idol	Zanclus	Z. cornutus	Zanclidae	Moorish idol	N
Puhi leihale	Barred moray	Echidna	E. polyzona	Muraenidae	Moray eel	N
Puhi kauila	Leopard moray	Enchelycore	E. pardalis	Muraenidae	Moray eel	N
Puhi	Dwarf moray	Gymnothorax	G. melatremus	Muraenidae	Moray eel	N
Puhi	Giant moray	Gymnothorax	G. javanicus	Muraenidae	Moray eel	N
Large-spotted snake moray	Large-spotted snake moray	Uropterygius	U. polyspilus	Muraenidae	Moray eel	N
Puhi kāpaʻa	Peppered moray	Gymnothorax	G. pictus	Muraenidae	Moray eel	N
Puhi	Slendertail moray	Gymnothorax	G. gracilicauda	Muraenidae	Moray eel	N
Puhi kāpā	Snowflake moray	Echidna	E. nebulosa	Muraenidae	Moray eel	N
Puhi	Brown speckled eel	Gymnothorax	G. steindachneri	Muraenidae	Moray eel	Y
Puhi	Tiger snake moray	Scuticaria	S. tigrina	Muraenidae	Moray eel	N
Puhi lau milo	Undulated moray	Gymnothorax	G. undulatus	Muraenidae	Moray eel	N
Puhi kauila	Viper moray	Enchelynassa	E. canina	Muraenidae	Moray eel	N
Puhi	Whitemargin moray	Gymnothorax	G. albimarginatus	Muraenidae	Moray eel	N
Puhi ʻōniʻo	Whitemouth moray	Gymnothorax	G. meleagris	Muraenidae	Moray eel	N
Puhi ʻou (puhi ʻapo)	Yellowhead moray	Gymnothorax	G. rueppelliae	Muraenidae	Moray eel	N
Puhi	Yellowmouth moray	Gymnothorax	G. nudivomer	Muraenidae	Moray eel	N
Puhi	Zebra moray	Gymnomuraena	G. zebra	Muraenidae	Moray eel	N
Ama'ama	Flathead grey mullet	Mugil	M. cephalus	Mugilidae	Mullet	N
Uoauoa	Acute-jawed mullet	Neomyxus	N. leuciscus	Mugilidae	Mullet	N
ʻAha	Crocodile needlefish	Ablennes	A. hians	Belonidae	Needlefish	N
ʻAha	Houndfish	Tylosurus	T. crocodilus	Belonidae	Needlefish	N
ʻAha	Keeltail needlefish	Platybelone	P. argalus	Belonidae	Needlefish	N
ʻAha	Needlefish	Strongylura	S. gigantea	Belonidae	Needlefish	N
Uhu	Bullethead parrotfish	Chlorurus	C. spilurus	Scaridae	Parrotfishes	N
Uhu pālukaluka	Ember parrotfish	Scarus	S. rubroviolaceus	Scaridae	Parrotfishes	N
Pōnuunuhu	Gaimard's parrotfish	Calotomus	C. carolinus	Scaridae	Parrotfishes	N
Uhu	Palenose parrotfish	Scarus	S. psittacus	Scaridae	Parrotfishes	N
Lauia	Regal parrotfish	Scarus	S. dubius	Scaridae	Parrotfishes	Y
Uhu	Spectacled parrotfish	Chlorurus	C. perspicillatus	Scaridae	Parrotfishes	N
Yellowbar parrotfish	Yellowbar parrotfish	Calotomus	C. zonarchus	Scaridae	Parrotfishes	Y
Cushion star pearlfish	Cushion star pearlfish	Carapus	C. mourlani	Carapidae	Pearlfish	N
Fowler's pearlfish	Fowler's pearlfish	Onuxodon	O. fowleri	Carapidae	Pearlfish	N
Ball's pipefish	Ball's pipefish	Cosmocampus	C. balli	Syngnathidae	Pipefish	Y
Bluestripe pipefish	Bluestripe pipefish	Doryrhamphus	D. excisus	Syngnathidae	Pipefish	N
Edmondson's pipefish	Edmondson's pipefish	Halicampus	H. edmondsoni	Syngnathidae	Pipefish	Y
Fisher's seahorse	Fisher's seahorse	Hippocampus	H. fisheri	Syngnathidae	Pipefish	Y
Hawaiian smooth seahorse	Hawaiian smooth seahorse	Hippocampus	H. kuda	Syngnathidae	Pipefish	N
Redstripe pipefish	Redstripe pipefish	Dunckerocampus	D. baldwini	Syngnathidae	Pipefish	Y
Thorny seahorse	Thorny seahorse	Hippocampus	H. histrix	Syngnathidae	Pipefish	N
Pomfret	Pomfret	Taractes	T. steindachneri	Bramidae	Pomfret	N
Kōkala (ʻoʻopu kawa)	Giant porcupinefish	Diodon	D. hystrix	Diodontidae	Porcupinefish	N
Kōkala (ʻoʻopu ōkala)	Longspine porcupinefish	Diodon	D. holocanthus	Diodontidae	Porcupinefish	N
Kōkala (ʻoʻopu hue)	Spotted burrfish	Chilomycterus	C. reticulatus	Diodontidae	Porcupinefish	N
Puʻu-olaʻi	Ambon toby	Canthigaster	C. amboinensis	Tetraodontidae	Pufferfish	N
Floral puffer	Floral puffer	Torquigener	T. florealis	Tetraodontidae	Pufferfish	N
Puʻu-olaʻi	Hawaiian whitespotted toby	Canthigaster	C. jactator	Tetraodontidae	Pufferfish	Y
Puʻu-olaʻi	Lantern toby	Canthigaster	C. epilampra	Tetraodontidae	Pufferfish	N
Puʻu-olaʻi	Maze toby	Canthigaster	C. rivulata	Tetraodontidae	Pufferfish	N
Randall's puffer	Randall's puffer	Torquigener	T. randalli	Tetraodontidae	Pufferfish	Y
ʻOʻopu hue (keke)	Stripebelly puffer	Arothron	A. hispidus	Tetraodontidae	Pufferfish	N
ʻOʻopu hue (keke)	Stripebelly puffer		A. meleagris	Tetraodontidae	Pufferfish	N
Hāhāua	Manta ray	Manta	M. birostris	Mobulidae	Ray	N
Hāhāua	Manta ray	Manta	M. alfredi	Mobulidae	Ray	N
Omo	Common remora	Remora	R. remora	Echeneidae	Remora	N
Leleiona	Slender remora	Echeneis	E. naucrates	Echeneidae	Remora	N
Pakiʻi	Three-spot flounder	Samariscus	S. triocellatus	Samaridae	Right-eyed flounder	N
South Pacific sandburrower	South Pacific sandburrower	Crystallodytes	C. cookei	Creediidae	Sandburrower	Y
Purple chimaera	Purple chimaera	Hydrolagus	H. purpurescens	Chimaeridae	Chimaera	Y
Longnosed chimaera	Pacific spookfish	Rhinochimaera	R. pacifica	Rhinochimaeridae	Chimaera	Y
Pyle's sandlance	Pyle's sandlance	Ammodytoides	A. pylei	Ammodytidae	Sandlance	Y
Redspotted sandperch	Redspotted sandperch	Parapercis	P. schauinslandii	Pinguipedidae	Sandperch	N
Goldspot sardine	Goldspot sardine	Herklotsichthys	H. quadrimaculatus	Dorosomatidae	Sardine	N
Makiawa	Round herring	Etrumeus	E. makiawa	Clupeidae	Sardine	Y
ʻOpelu	Mackerel scad	Decapterus	D. pinnulatus	Carangidae	Scad	N
Coral scorpionfish	Coral scorpionfish	Scorpaenodes	S. corallinus	Scorpaenidae	Scorpionfish	N
Nohu	Decoy scorpionfish	Iracundus	I. signifer	Scorpaenidae	Scorpionfish	N
Nohu ʻomakaha	Devil scorpionfish	Scorpaenopsis	S. diabolus	Scorpaenidae	Scorpionfish	N
Dwarf scorpionfish	Dwarf scorpionfish	Sebastapistes	S. fowleri	Scorpaenidae	Scorpionfish	N
Galactic scorpionfish	Galactic scorpionfish	Sebastapistes	S. galactacma	Scorpaenidae	Scorpionfish	N
Nohu pinao	Hawaiian green lionfish	Dendrochirus	D. barberi	Scorpaenidae	Scorpionfish	Y
Nohu pinao	Hawaiian turkeyfish	Pterois	P. sphex	Scorpaenidae	Scorpionfish	Y
Kellogg's scorpionfish	Kellogg's scorpionfish	Scorpaenodes	S. kelloggi	Scorpaenidae	Scorpionfish	N
Oʻopu kai nohu	Large headed scorpion	Pontinus	P. macrocephalus	Scorpaenidae	Scorpionfish	N
Leaf scorpionfish	Leaf scorpionfish	Taenianotus	T. triacanthus	Scorpaenidae	Scorpionfish	N
Lowfin scorpionfish	Lowfin scorpionfish	Scorpaenodes	S. parvipinnis	Scorpaenidae	Scorpionfish	N
Nohu	Shortsnout scorpionfish	Scorpaenopsis	S. brevifrons	Scorpaenidae	Scorpionfish	Y
Spotfin scorpionfish	Spotfin scorpionfish	Sebastapistes	S. ballieui	Scorpaenidae	Scorpionfish	Y
Strange-face scorpionfish	Strange-face scorpionfish	Rhinopias	R. xenops	Scorpaenidae	Scorpionfish	N
Nohu	Titan scorpionfish	Scorpaenopsis	S. cacopsis	Scorpaenidae	Scorpionfish	Y
Nenue	Bicolor chub	Kyphosus	K. hawaiiensis	Kyphosidae	Sea chubs	Y
Nenue	Brassy/lowfin chub	Kyphosus	K. vaigiensis	Kyphosidae	Sea chubs	N
Nenue	Gray chub	Kyphosus	K. sandwicensis	Kyphosidae	Sea chubs	N
Nenue	Highfin chub	Kyphosus	K. cinerascens	Kyphosidae	Sea chubs	N
Manō	Blue shark	Prionace	P. glauca	Carcharhinidae	Shark	N
Manō	Grey reef shark	Carcharhinus	C. amblyrhynchos	Carcharhinidae	Shark	N
Manō	Bignose shark	Carcharhinus	C. altimus	Carcharhinidae	Shark	N
Manō pāʻele	Blacktip shark	Carcharhinus	C. limbatus	Carcharhinidae	Shark	N
Manō pāʻele	Blacktip reef shark	Carcharhinus	C. melanopterus	Carcharhinidae	Shark	N
Cookiecutter shark	Cookiecutter shark	Isistius	I. brasilliensis	Dalatiidae	Shark	N
Megamouth shark	Megamouth shark	Megachasma	M. pelagios	Megachasmidae	Shark	N
Manō	Galápagos shark	Carcharhinus	C. galapagensis	Carcharhinidae	Shark	N
Manō	Sandbar shark	Carcharhinus	C. plumbeus	Carcharhinidae	Shark	N
Manō	Silky shark	Carcharhinus	C. falciformis	Carcharhinidae	Shark	N
Manō kihikihi	Scalloped hammerhead	Sphyrna	S. lewini	Sphyrnidae	Shark	N
Manō kihikihi	Smooth hammerhead	Sphyrna	S. zygaena	Sphyrnidae	Shark	N
Niuhi	Tiger shark	Galeocerdo	G. cuvier	Galeocerdonidae	Shark	N
Niuhi	Great white shark	Carcharodon	C. carcharias	Lamnidae	Shark	N
Manō	Shortfin mako shark	Isurus	I. oxyrinchus	Lamnidae	Shark	N
Whale shark	Whale shark	Rhincodon	R. typus	Rhincodontidae	Shark	N
Manō lālā kea	Whitetip reef shark	Triaenodon	T. obesus	Carcharhinidae	Shark	N
Manō lālā kea	Oceanic whitetip shark	Carcharhinus	C. longimanus	Carcharhinidae	Shark	N
Manō hiʻuka or manō laukahiʻu	Thresher shark	Alopias	A. pelagicus	Alopiidae	Shark	N
ʻIao	Hawaiian silverside	Atherinomorus	A. insularum	Atherinidae	Silverside	Y
Fowler's snake eel	Fowler's snake eel	Ophichthus	O. fowleri	Ophichthidae	Snake eel	Y
Freckled snake eel	Freckled snake eel	Callechelys	C. lutea	Ophichthidae	Snake eel	Y
Henshaw's snake eel	Henshaw's snake eel	Brachysomophis	B. henshawi	Ophichthidae	Snake eel	N
Large-spotted snake eel	Many-eyed snake eel	Ophichthus	O. polyophthalmus	Ophichthidae	Snake eel	N
Magnificent snake eel	Magnificent snake eel	Myrichthys	M. magnificus	Ophichthidae	Snake eel	Y
Pencil snake eel	Pencil snake eel	Apterichtus	A. klazingai	Ophichthidae	Snake eel	N
Saddled snake eel	Saddled snake eel	Leiuranus	L. semicinctus	Ophichthidae	Snake eel	N
Mū	Bigeye emperor	Monotaxis	M. grandoculis	Lethrinidae	Emperor breams	N
Toʻau	Black tail snapper	Lutjanus	L. fulvus	Lutjanidae	Snappers	N
Taʻape	Blue striped snapper	Lutjanus	L. kasmira	Lutjanidae	Snappers	N
ʻUkiʻuki (gindai)	Brigham's snapper	Pristipomoides	P. zonatus	Lutjanidae	Snappers	N
Wahanui	Forktail snapper	Aphareus	A. furca	Lutjanidae	Snappers	N
Uku	Gray jobfish	Aprion	A. virescens	Lutjanidae	Snappers	N
Lehi (Lehe)	Ironjaw snapper	Aphareus	A. rutilans	Lutjanidae	Snappers	N
ʻOpakapaka	Pink snapper	Pristipomoides	P. filamentosus	Lutjanidae	Snappers	N
Onaga	Longtail red snapper	Etelis	E. coruscans	Lutjanidae	Snappers	N
Ehu	Squirrelfish snapper	Etelis	E. carbunculus	Lutjanidae	Snappers	N
Kalekale	Von Siebold's snapper	Pristipomoides	P. sieboldii	Lutjanidae	Snappers	N
Boreham's sole	Boreham's sole	Aseraggodes	A. borehami	Soleidae	Sole	Y
Holcom's sole	Holcom's sole	Aseraggodes	A. holcomi	Soleidae	Sole	Y
Therese's sole	Therese's sole	Aseraggodes	A. therese	Soleidae	Sole	Y
Uʻu	Bigscale squirrelfish	Myripristis	M. berndti	Holocentridae	Squirrelfish	N
Alaʻihi	Bluestripe squirrelfish	Sargocentron	S. tiere	Holocentridae	Squirrelfish	N
Uʻu	Brick soldierfish	Myripristis	M. amaena	Holocentridae	Squirrelfish	N
Alaʻihi	Crown squirrelfish	Sargocentron	S. diadema	Holocentridae	Squirrelfish	N
Alaʻihi	Dwarf squirrelfish	Sargocentron	S. iota	Holocentridae	Squirrelfish	N
Alaʻihi	Hawaiian squirrelfish	Sargocentron	S. xantherythrum	Holocentridae	Squirrelfish	Y
Alaʻihi	Longjaw squirrelfish	Sargocentron	S. spiniferum	Holocentridae	Squirrelfish	N
Uʻu	Pearly squirrelfish/Shoulderbar squirrelfish	Myripristis	M. kuntee	Holocentridae	Squirrelfish	N
Alaʻihi	Peppered squirrelfish	Sargocentron	S. punctatissimum	Holocentridae	Squirrelfish	N
Uʻu	Rough-scale squirrelfish	Plectrypops	P. lima	Holocentridae	Squirrelfish	N
Alaʻihi	Spotfin squirrelfish	Neoniphon	N. sammara	Holocentridae	Squirrelfish	N
Alaʻihi	Goldline squirrelfish	Neoniphon	N. aurolineatus	Holocentridae	Squirrelfish	N
Whitespot squirrelfish	Whitespot squirrelfish	Pristilepis	P. oligolepis	Holocentridae	Squirrelfish	N
Uʻu	Whitetip squirrelfish	Myripristis	M. vittata	Holocentridae	Squirrelfish	N
Uʻu	Yellowfin squirrelfish	Myripristis	M. chryseres	Holocentridae	Squirrelfish	N
Yellowstripe squirrelfish	Yellowstripe squirrelfish	Sargocentron	S. ensifer	Holocentridae	Squirrelfish	N
Stripey	Stripey	Microcanthus	M. strigatus	Microcanthidae	Stripey	N
Pākuʻikuʻi	Achilles tang	Acanthurus	A. achilles	Acanthuridae	Surgeonfish	N
Māiʻiʻi	Black and brown surgeonfish	Acanthurus	A. nigrofuscus	Acanthuridae	Surgeonfish	N
Black surgeonfish	Black surgeonfish	Ctenochaetus	C. hawaiiensis	Acanthuridae	Surgeonfish	N
Maiko	Bluelined surgeonfish	Acanthurus	A. nigroris	Acanthuridae	Surgeonfish	N
Kala	Bluespine unicornfish	Naso	N. unicornis	Acanthuridae	Surgeonfish	N
Manini	Convict tang	Acanthurus	A. triostegus	Acanthuridae	Surgeonfish	N
Palani	Dussumier's surgeon	Acanthurus	A. dussumieri	Acanthuridae	Surgeonfish	N
Kole	Yellow-eyed surgeon	Ctenochaetus	C. strigosus	Acanthuridae	Surgeonfish	Y
Goldrim tang	Goldrim tang	Acanthurus	A. nigricans	Acanthuridae	Surgeonfish	N
Gray unicornfish	Gray unicornfish	Naso	N. hexacanthus	Acanthuridae	Surgeonfish	N
Lined surgeonfish	Lined surgeonfish	Acanthurus	A. lineatus	Acanthuridae	Surgeonfish	N
Naʻenaʻa	Orangeband surgeonfish	Acanthurus	A. olivaceus	Acanthuridae	Surgeonfish	N
Umauma lei	Orangespine unicornfish	Naso	N. lituratus	Acanthuridae	Surgeonfish	N
Kala lōlō	Paletail unicornfish	Naso	N. brevirostris	Acanthuridae	Surgeonfish	N
Pualu	Ringtail surgeonfish	Acanthurus	A. blochii	Acanthuridae	Surgeonfish	N
Api (māneoneo)	Sailfin tang	Zebrasoma	Z. veliferum	Acanthuridae	Surgeonfish	N
Kala holo (ʻlōpelu kala)	Sleek unicornfish	Naso	N. caesius	Acanthuridae	Surgeonfish	N
Thompson's surgeonfish	Thompson's surgeonfish	Acanthurus	A. thompsoni	Acanthuridae	Surgeonfish	N
Pualu	Elongate surgeonfish	Acanthurus	A. mata	Acanthuridae	Surgeonfish	N
Māikoiko	Whitebar surgeonfish	Acanthurus	A. leucopareius	Acanthuridae	Surgeonfish	N
Whitemargin unicornfish	Whitemargin unicornfish	Naso	N. annulatus	Acanthuridae	Surgeonfish	N
Api	Whitespotted surgeonfish	Acanthurus	A. guttatus	Acanthuridae	Surgeonfish	N
Lauʻīpala	Yellow tang	Zebrasoma	Z. flavescens	Acanthuridae	Surgeonfish	N
Pualu	Yellowfin surgeonfish	Acanthurus	A. xanthopterus	Acanthuridae	Surgeonfish	N
Aʻuku	Swordfish	Xiphias	X. gladius	Xiphiidae	Swordfish	N
Moi	Threadfin	Polydactylus	P. sexfilis	Polynemidae	Threadfin	N
Blackchin tilapia	Blackchin tilapia	Sarotherodon	S. melanotheron	Cirrhitidae	Tilapia	N
Flagtail tilefish	Flagtail tilefish	Malacanthus	M. brevirostris	Malacanthidae	Tilefish	N
Pake ulua	Bigeye trevally	Caranx	C. sexfasciatus	Carangidae	Trevally	N
Ulua lāʻ	Black trevally	Caranx	C. lugubris	Carangidae	Trevally	N
Kamanu	Rainbow runner	Elegatis	E. bipinnulatus	Carangidae	Trevally	N
ʻŌmilu	Bluefin trevally	Caranx	C. melampygus	Carangidae	Trevally	N
Ulua aukea	Giant trevally	Caranx	C. ignobilis	Carangidae	Trevally	N
Ulua paʻopaʻo	Golden trevally	Gnathanodon	G. speciosus	Carangidae	Trevally	N
Butaguchi	White trevally	Pseudocaranx	P. dentex	Carangidae	Trevally	Y
Humu-humu ʻleʻle	Black triggerfish	Melichthys	M. niger	Balistidae	Triggerfish	N
Blueline triggerfish	Blueline triggerfish	Xanthichthys	X. caeruleolineatus	Balistidae	Triggerfish	N
Humuhumu mimi	Bridled triggerfish	Sufflamen	S. fraenatum	Balistidae	Triggerfish	N
Finescale triggerfish	Finescale triggerfish	Balistes	B. polylepis	Balistidae	Triggerfish	N
Gilded triggerfish	Gilded triggerfish	Xanthichthys	X. auromarginatus	Balistidae	Triggerfish	N
Crosshatch triggerfish	Crosshatch triggerfish	Xanthichthys	X. mento	Balistidae	Triggerfish	N
Humuhumu- nukunukuāpuaʻa	Lagoon triggerfish	Rhinecanthus	R. aculeatus	Balistidae	Triggerfish	N
Humuhumu lei	Lei triggerfish	Sufflamen	S. bursa	Balistidae	Triggerfish	N
Humu-humu hiʻu lole	Pinktail triggerfish	Melichthys	M. vidua	Balistidae	Triggerfish	N
Humuhumu- nukunukuāpuaʻa	Reef triggerfish	Rhinecanthus	R. rectangulus	Balistidae	Triggerfish	N
Nūnū	Trumpetfish	Aulostomus	A. chinensis	Aulostomidae	Trumpetfish	N
Ahi palaha	Albacore tuna	Thunnus	T. alalunga	Scombridae	Tuna	N
Poʻonui	Bigeye tuna	Thunnus	T. obesus	Scombridae	Tuna	N
Kawakawa	Kawakawa	Euthynnus	E. affinis	Scombridae	Tuna	N
Aku	Skipjack tuna	Katsuwonus	K. pelamis	Scombridae	Tuna	N
Ono	Wahoo	Acanthocybium	A. solandri	Scombridae	Tuna	N
Ahi	Yellowfin tuna	Thunnus	T. albacares	Scombridae	Tuna	N
Laenihi	Baldwin's razor wrasse	Iniistius	I. baldwini	Labridae	Wrasses	N
Belted wrasse	Belted wrasse	Stethojulis	S. balteata	Labridae	Wrasses	Y
Hīnālea ʻiʻiwi (hīnālea ʻakilolo)	Bird wrasse	Gomphosus	G. varius	Labridae	Wrasses	N
Hilu	Black striped wrasse	Coris	C. flavovittata	Labridae	Wrasses	Y
Laenihi	Blackside razor wrasse	Iniistius	I. umbrilatus	Labridae	Wrasses	Y
Laenihi	Brownspot razor wrasse	Iniistius	I. celebicus	Labridae	Wrasses	N
Christmas wrasse	Christmas wrasse	Thalassoma	T. trilobatum	Labridae	Wrasses	N
Kūpou	Cigar wrasse	Cheilio	C. inermis	Labridae	Wrasses	N
Disappearing wrasse	Striated wrasse	Pseudocheilinus	P. evanidus	Labridae	Wrasses	N
Eightline wrasse	Eight-lined wrasse	Pseudocheilinus	P. octotaenia	Labridae	Wrasses	N
Five stripe wrasse	Fivestripe wrasse	Thalassoma	T. quinquevittatum	Labridae	Wrasses	N
Elegant coris	Elegant coris	Coris	C. venusta	Labridae	Wrasses	Y
Flame wrasse	Flame wrasse	Cirrhilabrus	C. jordani	Labridae	Wrasses	Y
Forktail sand wrasse	Forktail sand wrasse	Ammolabrus	A. dicrus	Labridae	Wrasses	N
Fourline wrasse	Four-lined wrasse	Pseudocheilinus	P. tetrataenia	Labridae	Wrasses	N
Hawaiian cleaner wrasse	Hawaiian cleaner wrasse	Labroides	L. phthirophagus	Labridae	Wrasses	Y
Malamalama	Lined coris	Coris	C. ballieui	Labridae	Wrasses	Y
Hinālea luahine	Old woman wrasse	Thalassoma	T. ballieui	Labridae	Wrasses	Y
Ornate wrasse	Ornate wrasse	Halichoeres	H. ornatissimus	Labridae	Wrasses	Y
Laenihi	Peacock razor wrasse, black-barred razorfish, blue razorfish, pavo razorfish, nabeta	Iniistius	I. pavo	Labridae	Wrasses	N
Pencil wrasse	Pencil wrasse	Pseudojuloides	P. cerasinus	Labridae	Wrasses	N
Poʻou	Ringtail wrasse	Oxycheilinus	O. unifasciatus	Labridae	Wrasses	N
Rockmover wrasse	Rockmover wrasse	Novaculichthys	N. taeniourus	Labridae	Wrasses	N
Poʻou	Rose colored wrasse	Oxycheilinus	O. orientalis	Labridae	Wrasses	N
Hinālea lauwili	Saddle wrasse	Thalassoma	T. duperrey	Labridae	Wrasses	Y
Shortnose wrasse	Shortnose wrasse	Macropharyngodon	M. geoffroy	Labridae	Wrasses	Y
Slingjaw wrasse	Slingjaw wrasse	Epibulus	E. insidiator	Labridae	Wrasses	N
Sunset wrasse	Sunset wrasse	Thalassoma	T. lutescens	Labridae	Wrasses	N
Surge wrasse	Surge wrasse	Thalassoma	T. purpureum	Labridae	Wrasses	N
Twospot wrasse	Twospot wrasse	Oxycheilinus	O. bimaculatus	Labridae	Wrasses	N
Laenihi	Whitepatch razor wrasse	Iniistius	I. aneitensis	Labridae	Wrasses	N
Laenihi	Wood's razor wrasse	Novaculops	N. woodi	Labridae	Wrasses	Y
Hīnālea ʻakilolo	Yellowtail coris	Coris	C. gaimard	Labridae	Wrasses	N
Aʻawa	Hawaiian hogfish	Bodianus	B. albotaeniatus	Labridae	Wrasses	Y
ʻOpule	Pearl wrasse	Anampses	A. cuvier	Labridae	Wrasses	Y
ʻOpule	Psychedelic wrasse	Anampses	A. chrysocephalus	Labridae	Wrasses	Y
Sunrise hogfish	Sunrise hogfish	Bodianus	B. sanguineus	Labridae	Wrasses	Y
Hīhīmanu	Broad stingray	Bathytoshia	B. lata	Dasyatidae	Whiptail stingray	N
ʻOʻopu	Hawaiian freshwater goby	Lentipes	Lentipes concolor	Oxudercidae	Goby	Y

== Images ==
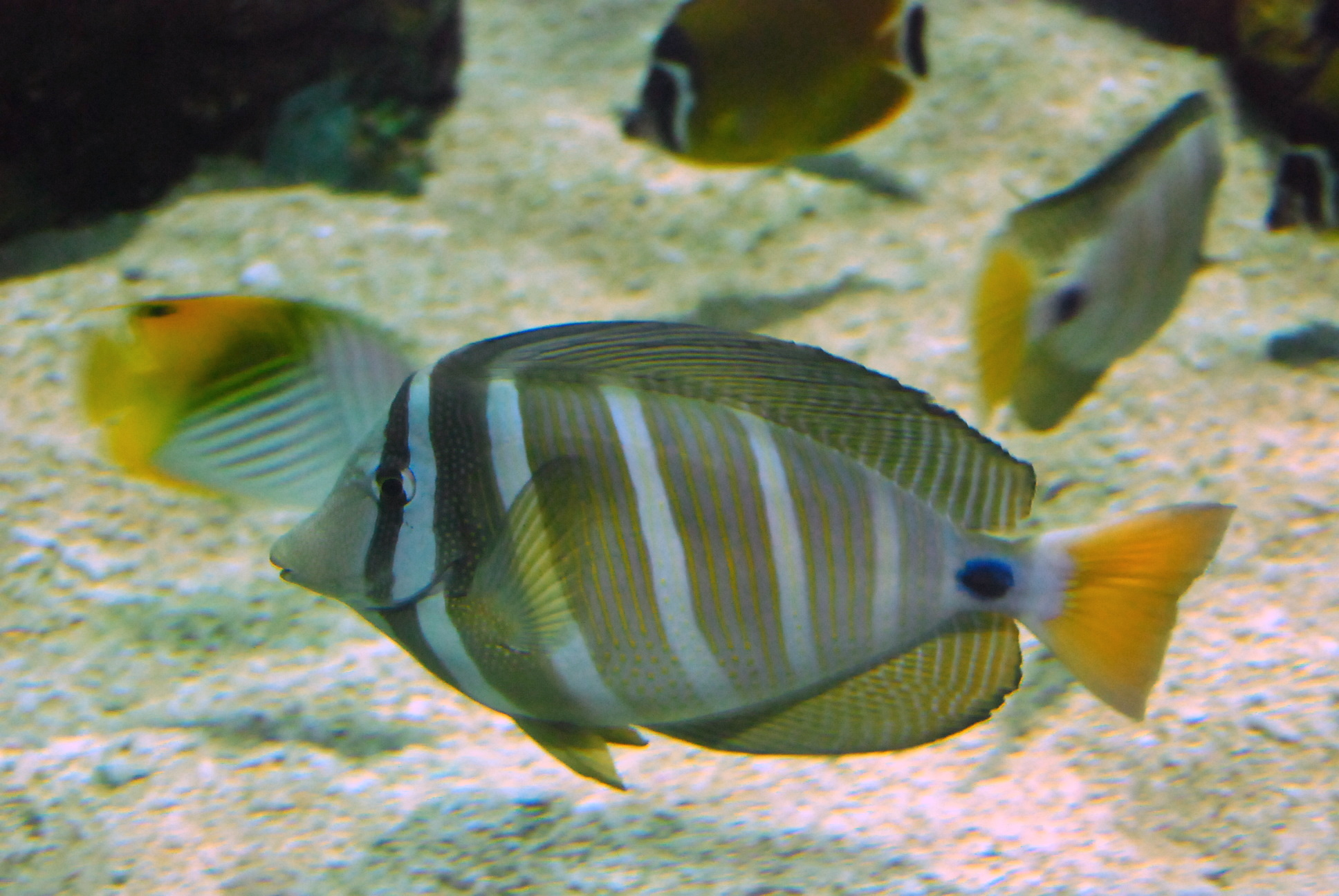
A sailfin tang, a brown fish with five vertical white stripes, a blue spot on the caudal fin, and yellow fins.

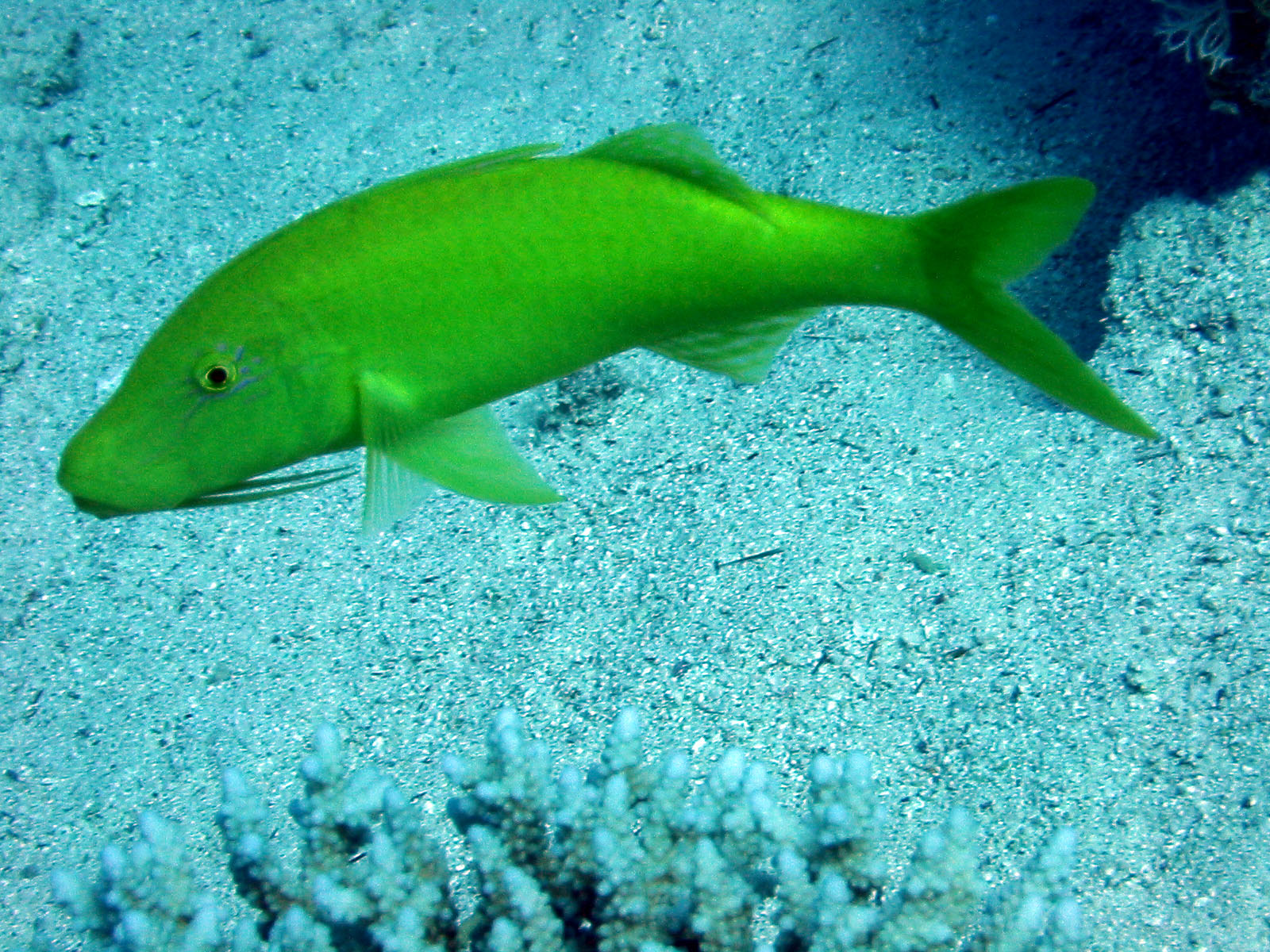
A green moana kali fish on a light blue background.

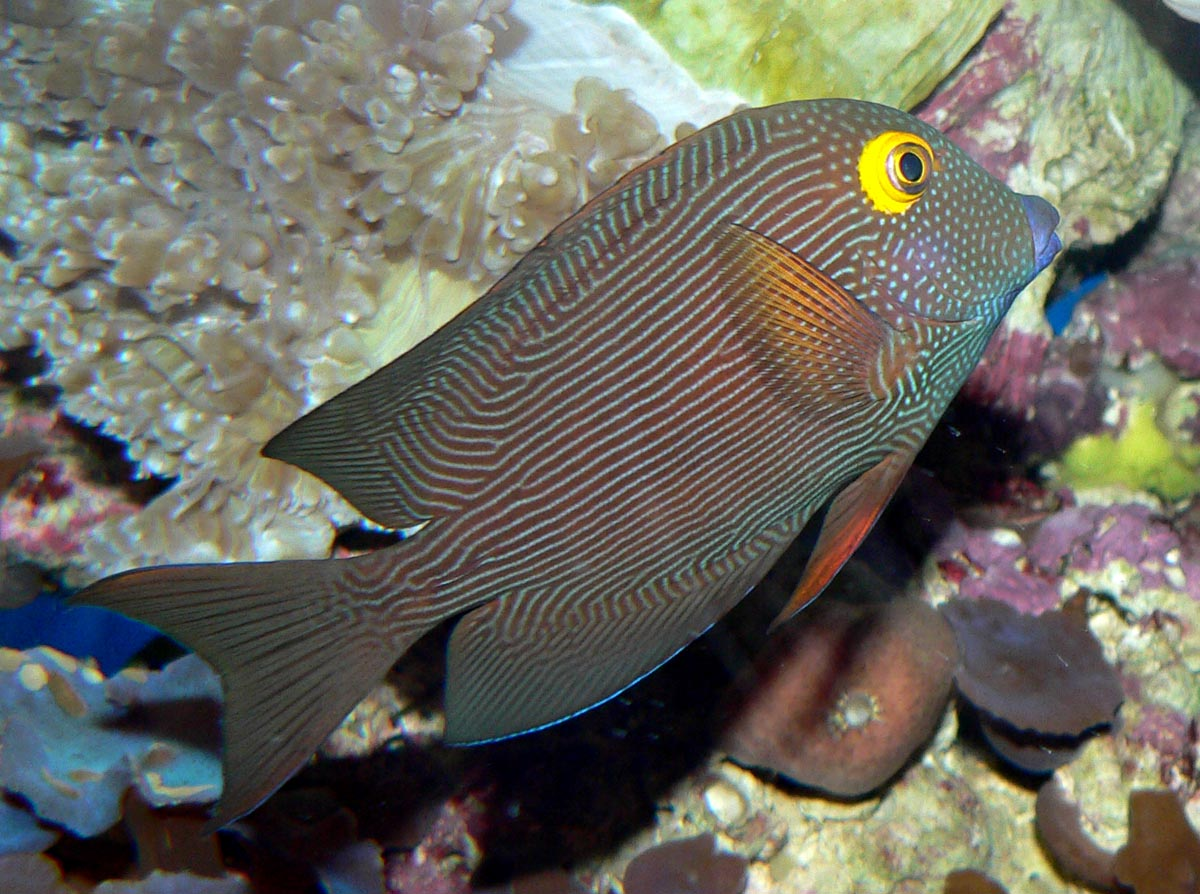
A yellow-eyed surgeon, a brown and white fish with a bright yellow eye.

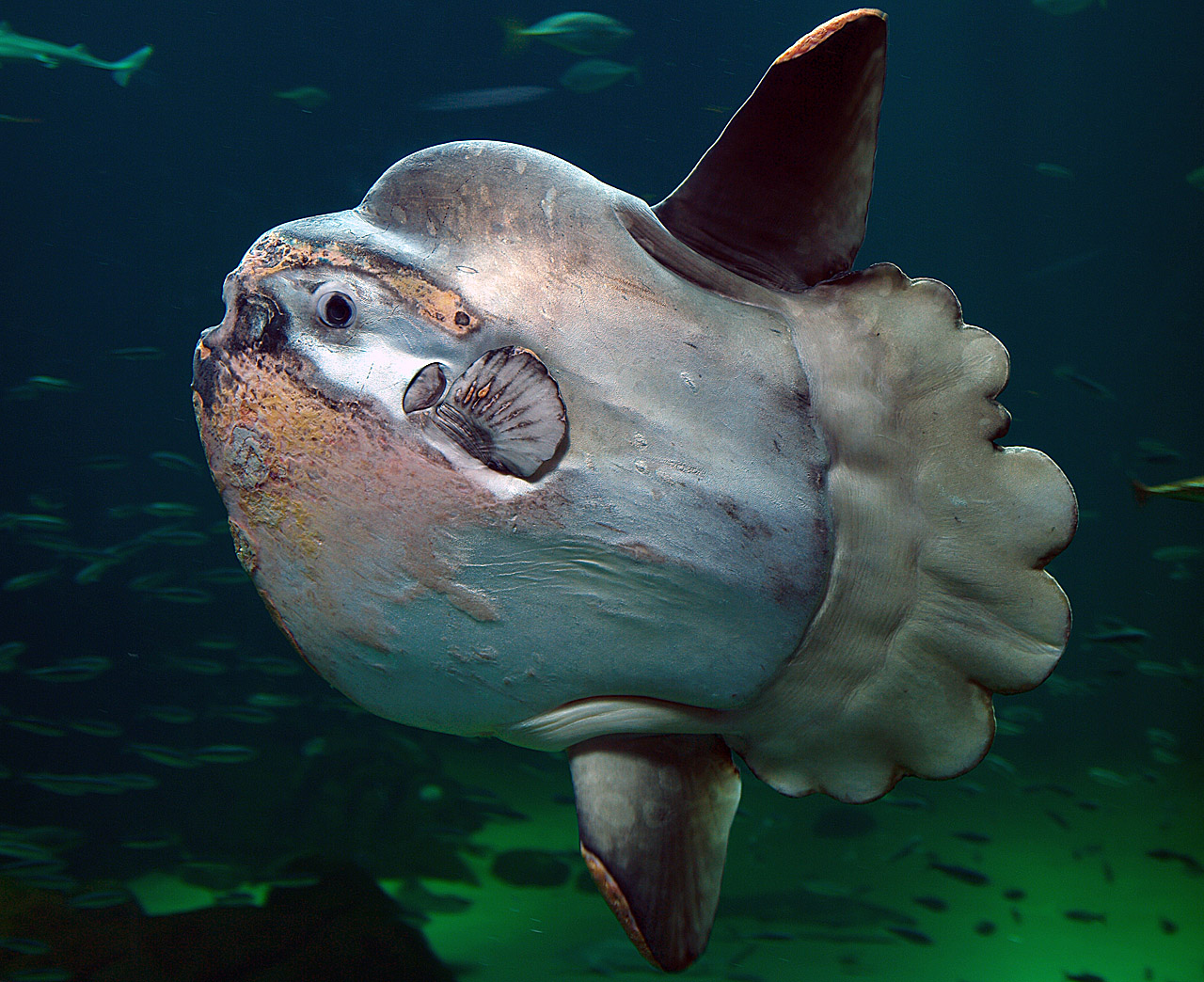
Ocean sunfish

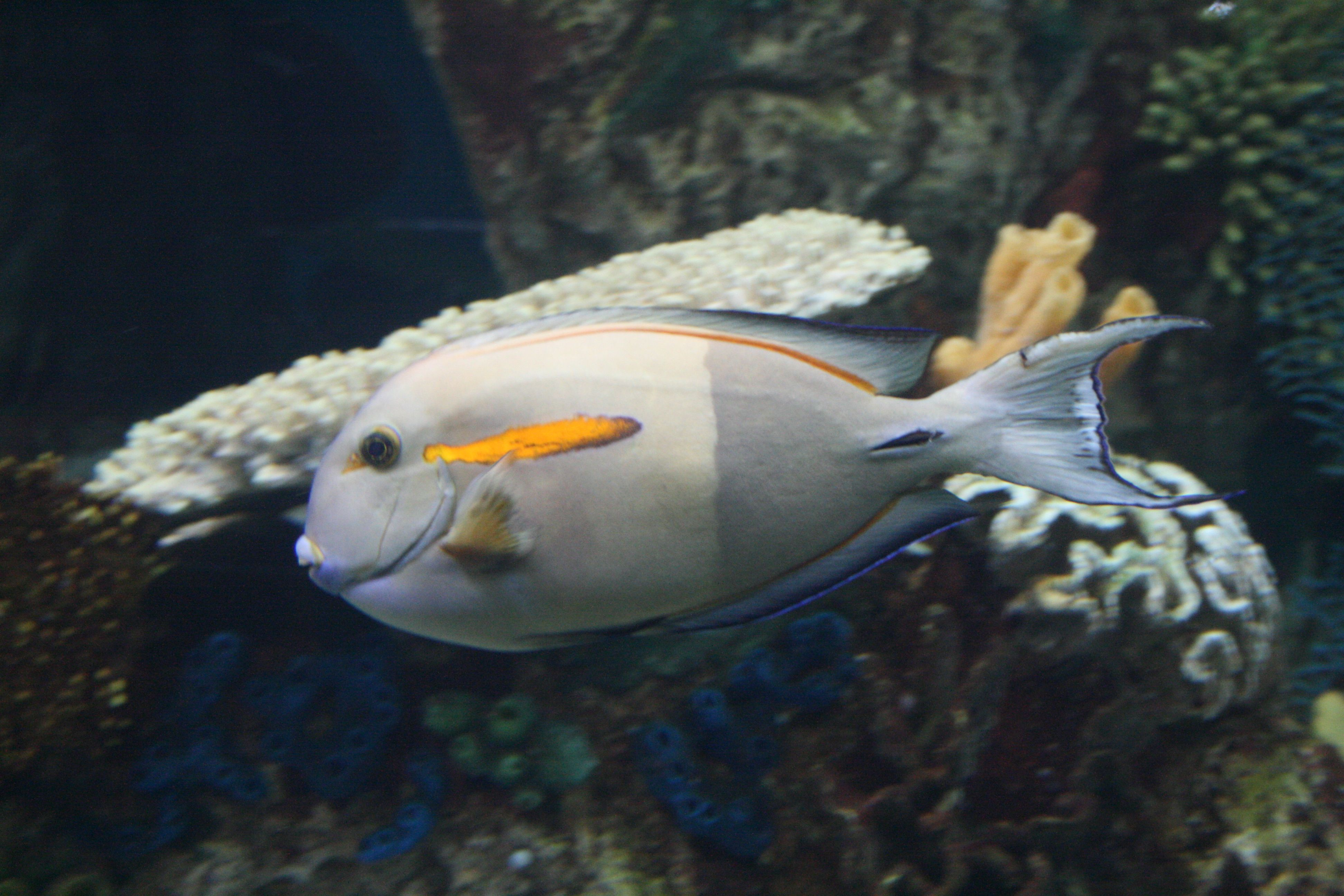
An orangeband surgeonfish, a light grey fish with a dark grey back half, an orange stripe running from just below the eye past the ventral fins, and stopping just before the fish's dorsal fin. This fish has a very heavily lyre-shaped tail.

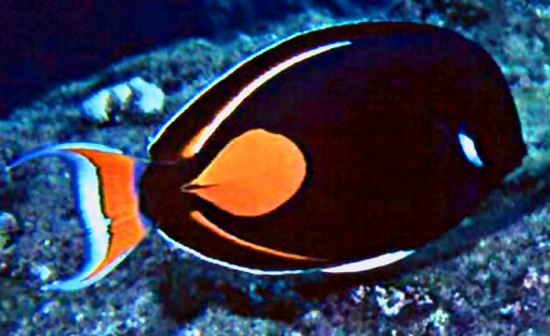
An Achilles tang, a black, lyre-tailed fish with an orange spot just before the caudal peduncle, black dorsal and anal fins with an orange stripe marking the boundary between fin and body. The tail is orange and white.

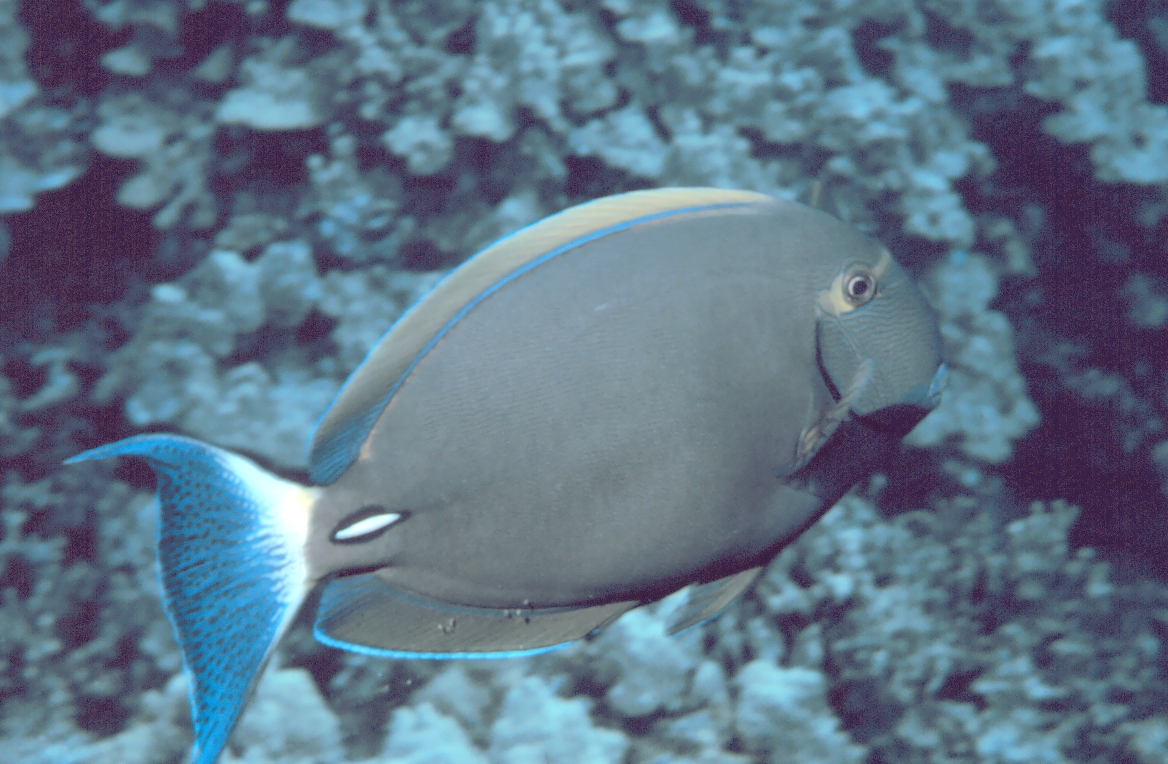
Dussumier's surgeon, a grey fish with a blue lyre-tail and a white spot on the caudal peduncle.

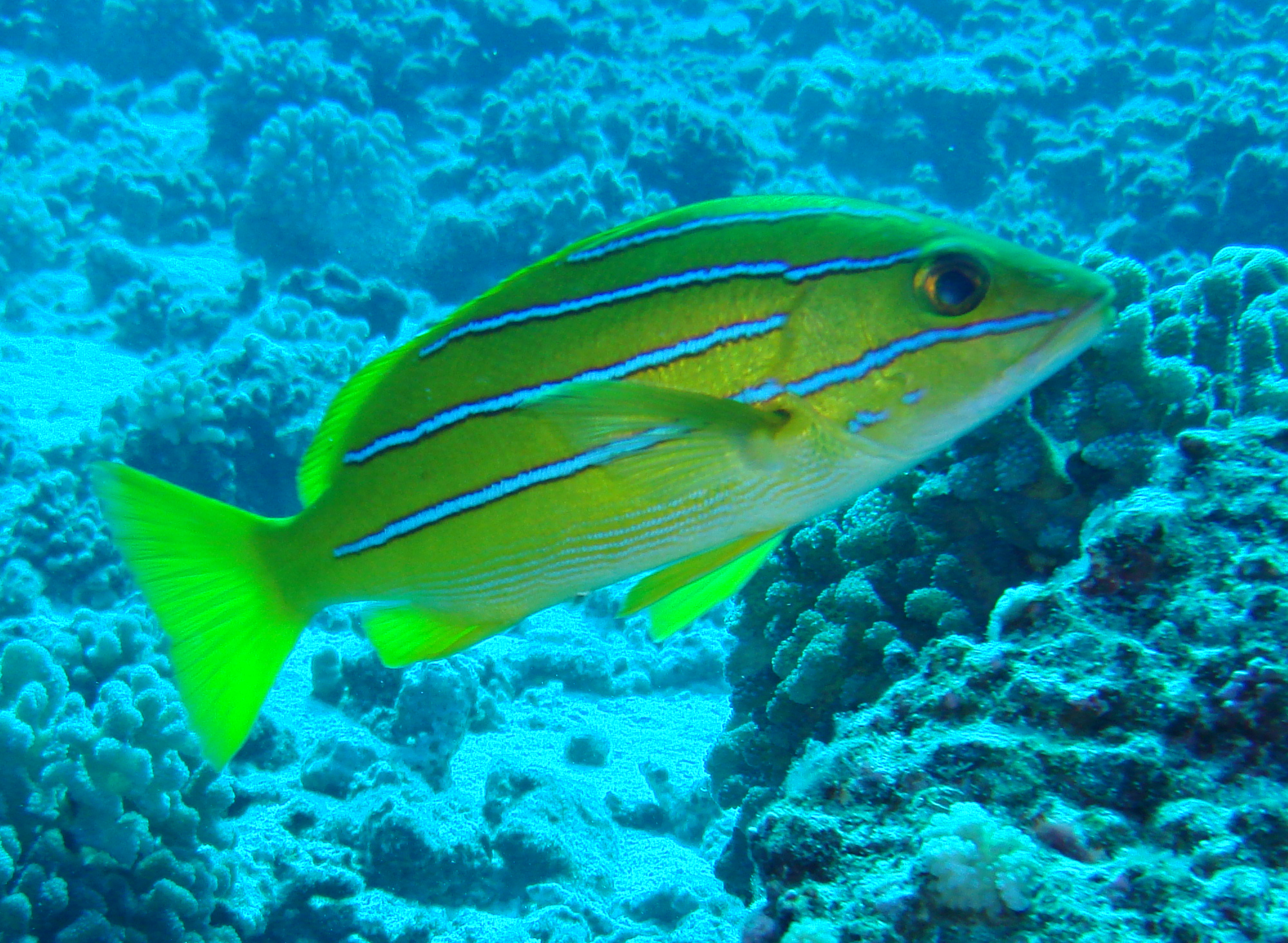
A blue striped snapper, a neon-green fish with four horizontal neon blue stripes running the length of its body.

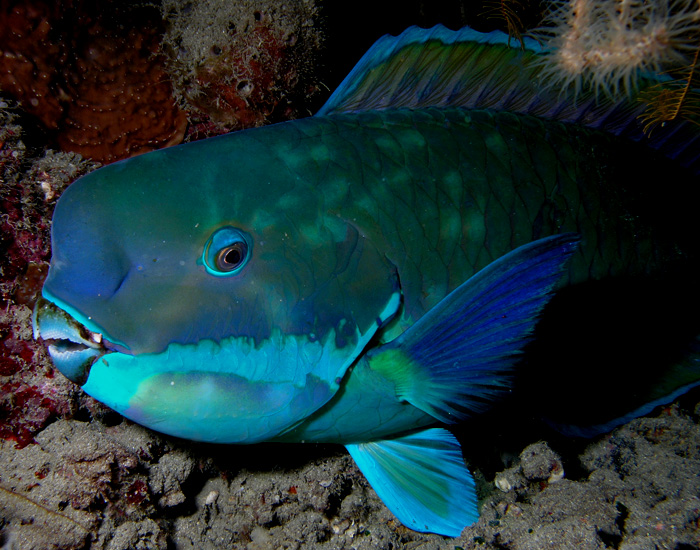
A parrotfish is a large, dark blue fish with a light blue underbelly and a protruding forehead.

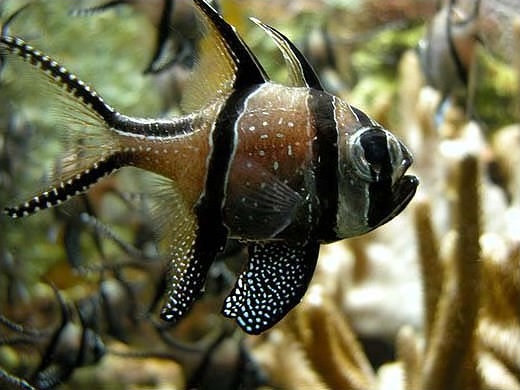
A cardinal fish, a brown fish with three vertical black stripes, black outlining on the caudal fin and caudal peduncle, and covered in white spots.
