= Iniistius umbrilatus =

Conservation status
- Least Concern (IUCN 3.1)

Scientific classification
- Kingdom: Animalia
- Phylum: Chordata
- Class: Actinopterygii
- Order: Labriformes
- Family: Labridae
- Genus: Iniistius
- Species: I. umbrilatus

Binomial name
- Iniistius umbrilatus (O. P. Jenkins, 1901)

Synonyms
- Hemipteronotus umbrilatus Jenkins, 1901; Xyrichtys umbrilatus (Jenkins, 1901)

Species of fish

Iniistius umbrilatus, the razor wrasse fish, is a species of marine ray-finned fish from the family Labridae, the wrasses. It is found in the eastern-central Pacific Ocean.

== Description ==
This species reaches a length of 12.9 cm (5.1 in).
