= Pseudamiops diaphanes =

Scientific classification
- Kingdom: Animalia
- Phylum: Chordata
- Class: Actinopterygii
- Order: Gobiiformes
- Family: Apogonidae
- Genus: Pseudamiops
- Species: P. diaphanes

Binomial name
- Pseudamiops diaphanes Randall, 1998

Synonyms
- Pseudamiops gracilicauda

Species of fish

Pseudamiops diaphanes, commonly known as the clear cardinalfish, is a species of cardinalfish endemic to Hawaii.

== Description & Biology ==
Pseudamiops diaphanes are 2 inches long. The body is very elongated. This species is transparent and has a dusky lip. The caudal peduncle is lengthy as the caudal fin is rhomboid. On the base of the caudal fin they have a faint dark bar that goes across. They have cycloid scales that are thin and shed easily. They lack a lateral line and a supramaxilla. They have a bony process that points down to the back of the maxilla. The preopercular edge is serrated and the ridge is smooth.

Pseudamiops diaphanes stay in dark holes during the day and come up at night to feed on zooplankton.

== Distribution & Habitat ==
Pseudamiops diaphanes is endemic to Hawai'i. The species is common but rarely seen as it is small, transparent and nocturnal.
