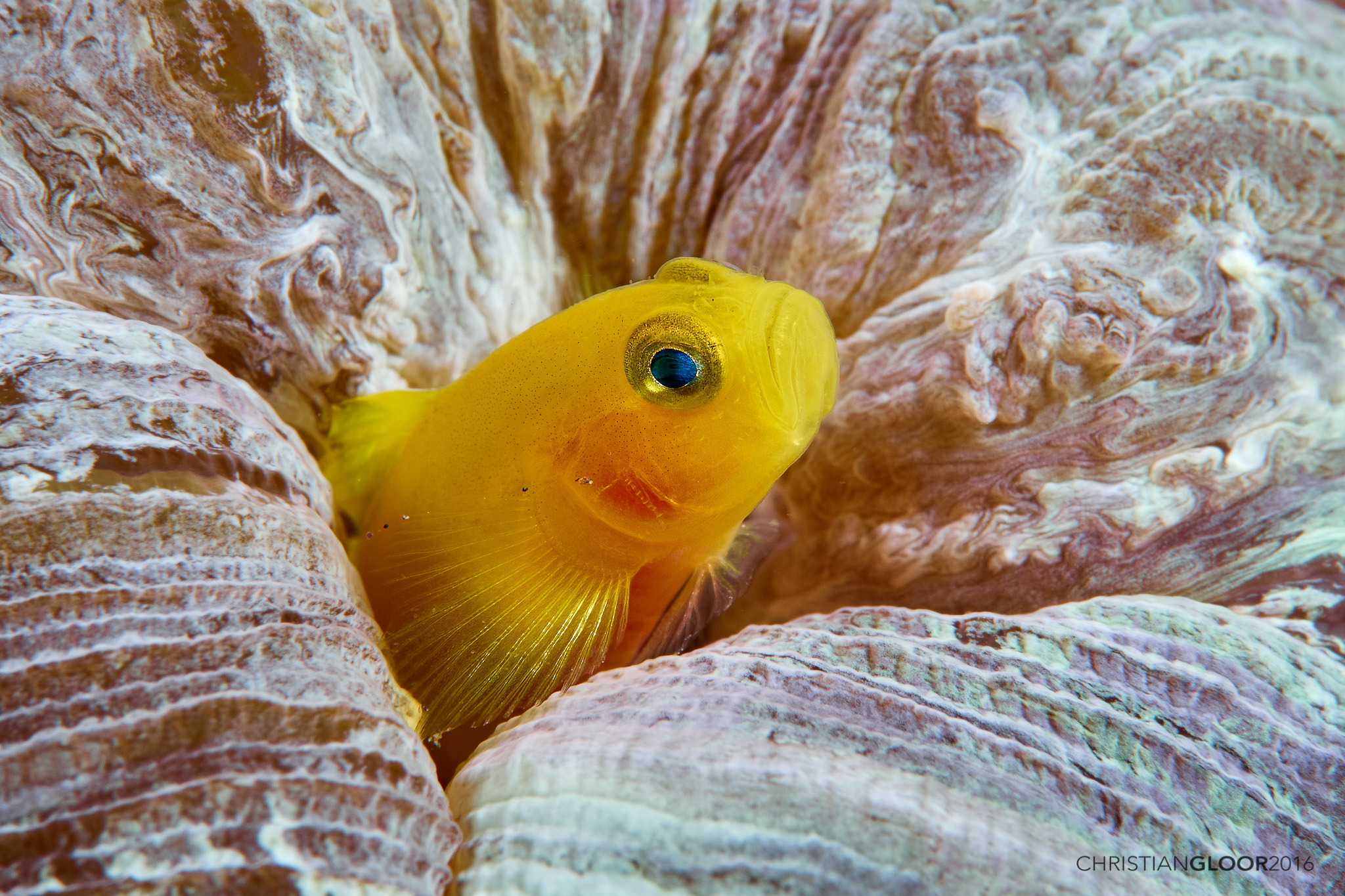

Scientific classification
- Kingdom: Animalia
- Phylum: Chordata
- Class: Actinopterygii
- Division: Teleostei
- Order: Gobiiformes
- Family: Gobiidae
- Genus: Priolepis
- Species: P. aureoviridis

Binomial name
- Priolepis aureoviridis (Gosline, 1959)

Synonyms
- Quisquilius aureoviridis Gosline, 1959

= Priolepis aureoviridis =

Species of fish

Priolepis aureoviridis, the Yellow-green goby, is a species of goby native to the central Pacific Ocean where it is known to occur in Micronesia, Johnston Atoll and the Hawaiian Islands. It can be found on the seaward side of reefs and is a secretive fish. It can reach a length of 6.4 centimetres (2.5 in) TL.

Description

The Priolepis aureoviridi is typically bright yellow throughout the body and fins and with darker faded yellow stripes and yellow eyes. The Priolepis aureoviridi total length is 5 inches and 6 centimeters. The Priolepis aureoviridi feeds in the benthic zone where the invertebrates and zooplankton are.

Behavior

The Priolepis aureoviridi has a shy temperament and homeostatic often spending their time in caves and rock crevices perched upside down on the ceiling. While they do not bother corals or ornamental invertebrates they are very territorial regarding their habitat whether that be a cave or a rock crevice. They exhibit a sit-and-wait predatory style once comfortable.

Distribution and Habitat

The Priolepis aureoviridi is native to the Central Pacific Ocean, including parts of Micronesia, Johnston Atoll and the Hawaiian Islands. The habitat of the Priolepis aureoviridis can be found in caves and deep crevices in seaward reefs in the shallower range that is normally common range they can go up to depths of 200 feet.

Classification

The Priolepis aureoviridi or well known as the Yellow-green goby is part of the Gobiidae family. Just as their counterparts the Priolepis aureoviridi they share many characteristics with many types with the Gobiidaes. The physical features that mostly stand out with the Priolepis aureoviridi is their bright yellow scales and fins. They belong to the superclass of actinopteri and the Subfamily of Gobiinae. Also carrying many distinctive features to the Priolepis aureoviridi.
