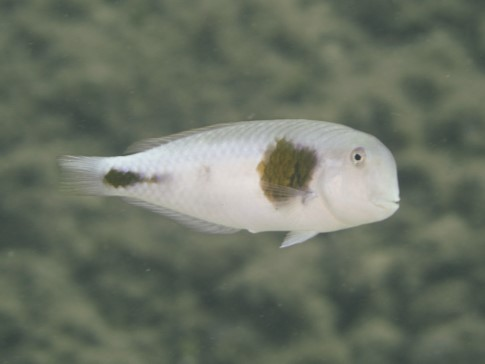

Conservation status
- Least Concern (IUCN 3.1)

Scientific classification
- Kingdom: Animalia
- Phylum: Chordata
- Class: Actinopterygii
- Order: Labriformes
- Family: Labridae
- Genus: Iniistius
- Species: I. celebicus

Binomial name
- Iniistius celebicus (Bleeker, 1856)

Synonyms
- Novacula celebica Bleeker, 1856; Xyrichtys celebicus (Bleeker, 1856)

= Iniistius celebicus =

Species of fish

Iniistius celebicus, the Celebes razorfish, is a species of marine ray-finned fish in the family Labridae, the wrasses. It is found in the Pacific Ocean.

== Description ==
This species reaches a length of 16.1 cm (6.3 in).
