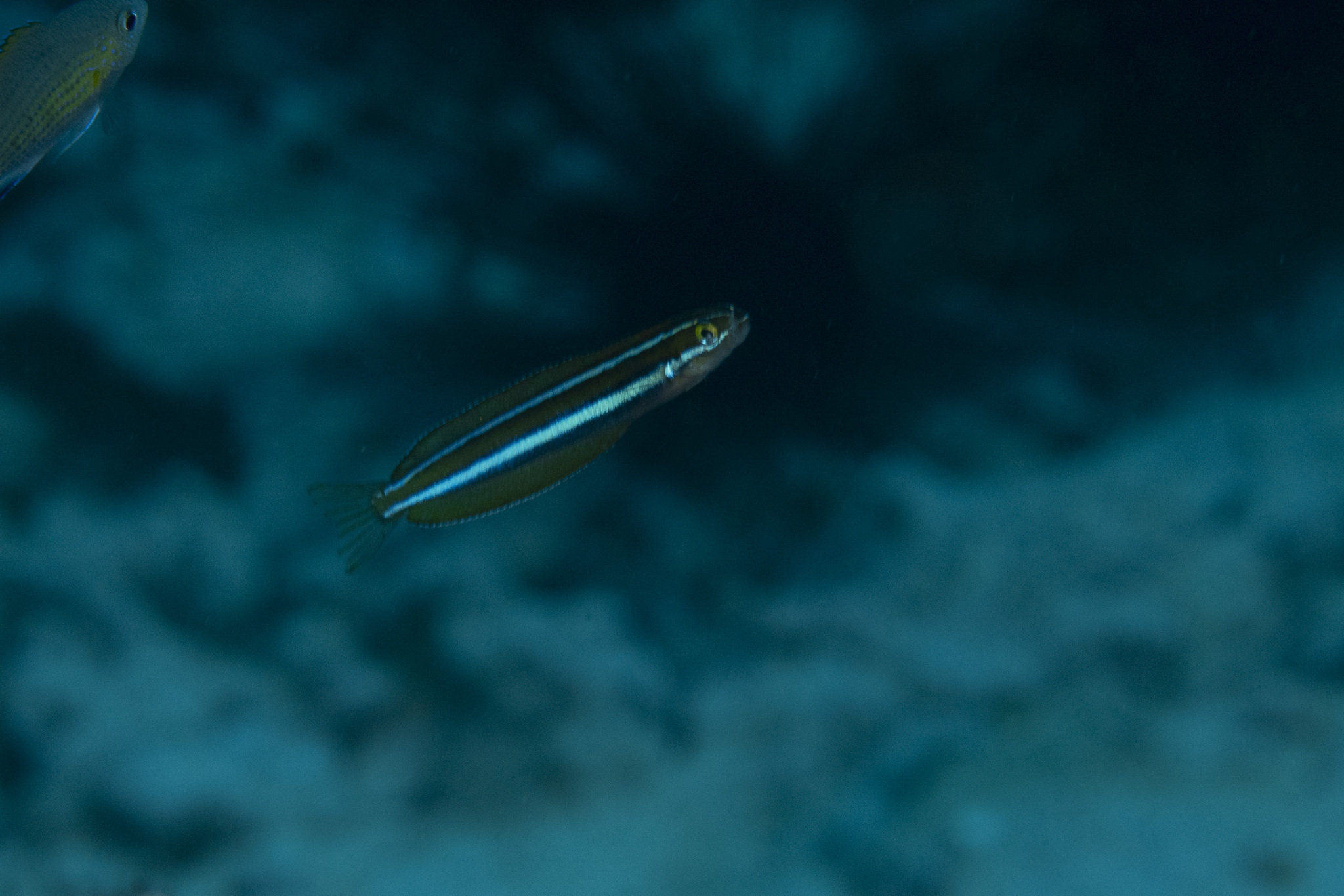
- In Hawaii

Conservation status
- Least Concern (IUCN 3.1)

Scientific classification
- Kingdom: Animalia
- Phylum: Chordata
- Class: Actinopterygii
- Division: Teleostei
- Order: Blenniiformes
- Family: Blenniidae
- Genus: Plagiotremus
- Species: P. ewaensis

Binomial name
- Plagiotremus ewaensis (Brock, 1948)

Synonyms
- Petroscirtes ewaensis Brock, 1948

= Plagiotremus ewaensis =

Species of fish

Plagiotremus ewaensis, the Ewa blenny, Ewa fangblenny or the blue-stripe blenny, is a reef fish belonging to the Blenniidae family. This species of combtooth blenny can be found in coral reefs and is an endemic species to the Hawaiian Islands.

== Description ==
This species is orange or reddish-brown in color, with blue and black stripes along the length of their body. They can grow up to about 4 in (100 mm). The Ewa fang blenny gets its name from their sharp fangs. They have fangs which they use to bite off flesh from their food sources and defending themselves from predators. If they get eaten, the fang blenny will bite the inside of their predator's mouth until the predator allows them to escape. The Ewa fang blenny is a carnivore, wandering the reef to feed on scales, skin, and mucus from bigger fish. This species is a secondary consumer, which means that they also feed on predators, like sharks.

== Distribution and habitat ==
The Ewa fang blenny is an endemic species that currently exists in the Hawaiian Islands. This species resides in the reef in sea depths of 4 to 55 meters and temperatures ranging from 76.82 °F - 80.24 °F (or 24.9°C - 26.8°C). The fang blenny will make use of empty worm snail holes in the reef as protection when predators try to attack.
