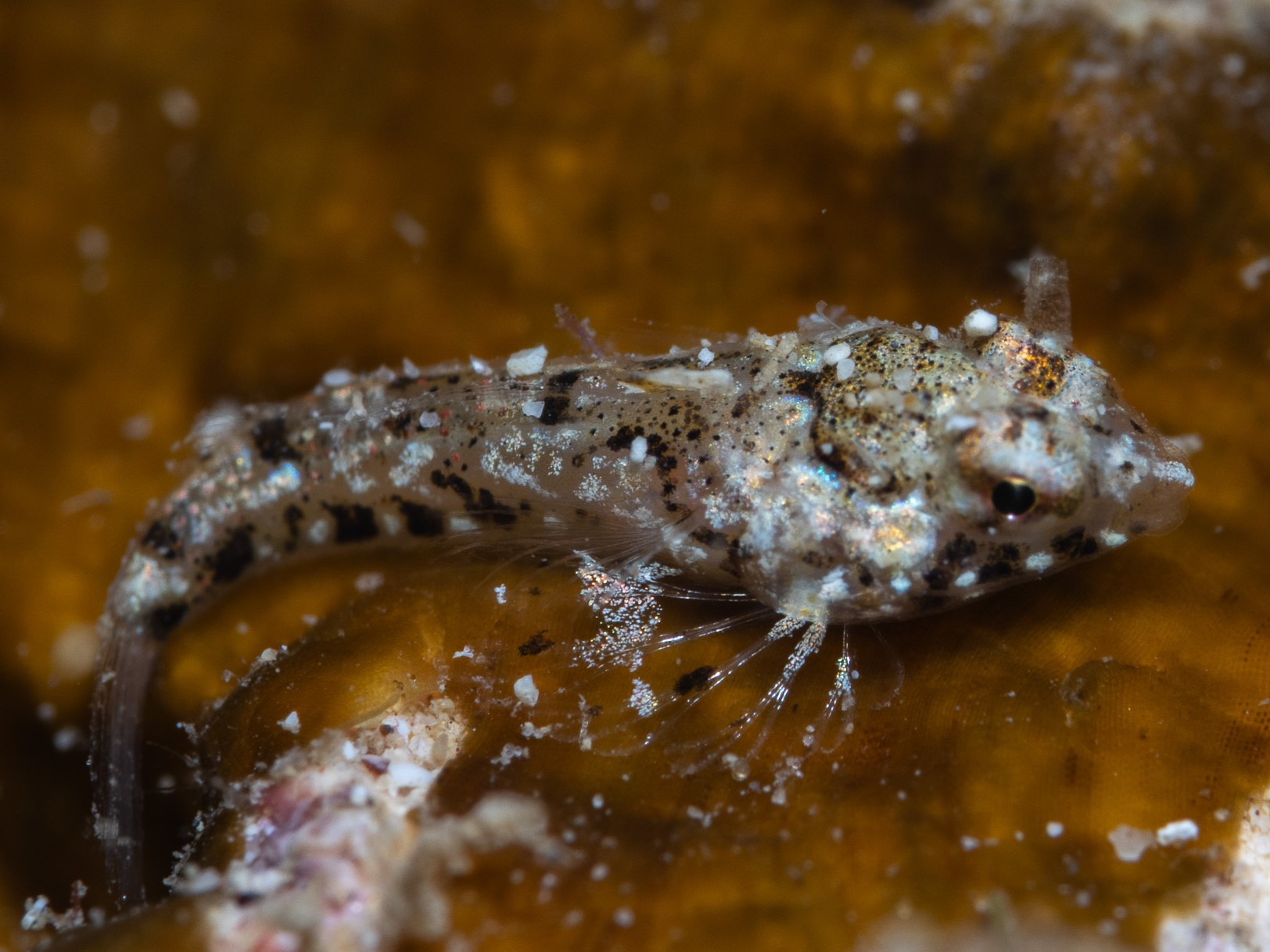

Scientific classification
- Domain: Eukaryota
- Kingdom: Animalia
- Phylum: Chordata
- Class: Actinopterygii
- Order: Callionymiformes
- Family: Callionymidae
- Genus: Synchiropus
- Species: S. rosulentus

Binomial name
- Synchiropus rosulentus Randall, 1999

= Synchiropus rosulentus =

Species of fish

Synchiropus rosulentus, the rosy dragonet, is a species of fish in the dragonet family Callionymidae. It is found in the eastern-central Pacific Ocean.

== Description ==
This species reaches a length of 2.2 cm (0.87 in).
