= Apogon deetsie =

Scientific classification
- Kingdom: Animalia
- Phylum: Chordata
- Class: Actinopterygii
- Division: Teleostei
- Order: Gobiiformes
- Family: Apogonidae
- Genus: Apogon
- Species: A. deetsie

Binomial name
- Apogon deetsie Randall, 1998

Species of ray-finned fish

Apogon deetsie, also called Deetsie's cardinalfish, is a marine fish in the family Apogonidae.

The genus name comes from the Greek a-, meaning "without", and pogon, meaning "chin" or "beard". The species name is an eponym honoring Dr. Edith "Deetsie" Chave, an ichthyologist and marine biologist at the University of Hawaii. The species was named in recognition of her contributions towards Hawaiian marine research, particularly her research on cardinalfish.
