= Scorpaenodes kelloggi =

Scientific classification
- Kingdom: Animalia
- Phylum: Chordata
- Class: Actinopterygii
- Division: Teleostei
- Order: Perciformes
- Family: Scorpaenidae
- Genus: Scorpaenodes
- Species: S. kelloggi

Binomial name
- Scorpaenodes kelloggi (Jenkins, 1903)

Species of ray-finned fish

Scorpaenodes kelloggi, Kellogg's scorpionfish, is a marine fish in the family Scorpaenidae.

== Description ==
Scorpaenodes kelloggi typically has 8 dorsal fin soft rays, 13 dorsal fin spines, 27-35 longitudinal series scale rows, and no scales on the underside of its head. It typically has dark coloring with blotches on its body and a black band posteriorly.

== Distribution and habitat ==
Kellogg's scorpionfish is widely found across the Indo-Pacific in shallow warm waters near or around outer reefs. It has been sighted from East Africa to Hawaii to Australia. It lives in rocky reefs/coral and can often be found hiding under rocks or other structures.

== Behavior ==
Scorpaenodes kelloggi is a carnivorous fish and primarily nocturnal. It produces eggs in gelatinous sac-like structures. Its hunting style is based on waiting for prey to come close enough before striking, blending into its environment of rubble and rocks.
