= Scorpaenodes corallinus =

Scientific classification
- Kingdom: Animalia
- Phylum: Chordata
- Class: Actinopterygii
- Order: Perciformes
- Family: Scorpaenidae
- Genus: Scorpaenodes
- Species: S. corallinus

Binomial name
- Scorpaenodes corallinus Smith, 1957

Marine fish species

Scorpaenodes corallinus, also called the coral scorpionfish, is a marine fish in the family Scorpaenidae. Scorpaenodes is derived from the Latin word scorpaena, meaning a kind of sea fish, specifically the scorpionfish.

== Description ==
Scorpaenodes corallinus is distinguished by their red and brown coloration with white specks, white stripes from the pectoral fin to the dorsal fin, a single white stripe on the tail, and a protruding lower portion of the jaw. Typical specimens are 4 inches in length. Coral scorpionfish typically have 13 dorsal spines, 8 dorsal soft rays, 3 anal spines, and 5 anal soft rays, with a fusiform (normal) body shape. The dorsal and anal fins contain venomous spines.

== Distribution ==
Coral scorpionfish can be found in the tropical Indo-Pacific, including Australia, Indonesia, East Africa, Japan, Hawaiʻi, French Polynesia, Mozambique, Tanzania, Kenya, the Seychelles, Loyalty Islands, and New Caledonia.

== Habitat ==
Coral scorpionfish typically inhabit live coral and coral reefs but can be found under rock slabs. They have been reported from the surface to 70 feet (21 m), but are more common above 20 feet (6 m).

== Behavior ==
Scorpaenodes corallinus exhibits solitary behavior.

== Reproduction ==
Scorpaenodes corallinus is dioecious and reproduces via external fertilization. They are non-guarders and leave eggs scattered in open water or on substrate.

== Diet ==
Coral scorpionfish feed on smaller aquatic organisms, including fish and crustaceans.

== Conservation ==
Coral scorpionfish are currently listed as “Least Concern” according to the IUCN Red List. This categorization means that coral scorpionfish are abundant and widely distributed, with no evidence indicating that they are endangered.
