= Scorpaenodes parvipinnis =

Scientific classification
- Kingdom: Animalia
- Phylum: Chordata
- Class: Actinopterygii
- Division: Teleostei
- Order: Perciformes
- Family: Scorpaenidae
- Genus: Scorpaenodes
- Species: S. parvipinnis

Binomial name
- Scorpaenodes parvipinnis (Garrett, 1864)

Species of ray-finned fish

Scorpaenodes parvipinnis, the lowfin scorpionfish, is a marine fish in the family Scorpaenidae.
