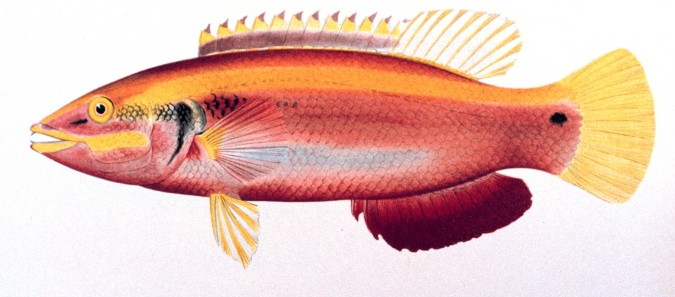

Conservation status
- Least Concern (IUCN 3.1)

Scientific classification
- Kingdom: Animalia
- Phylum: Chordata
- Class: Actinopterygii
- Order: Labriformes
- Family: Labridae
- Genus: Bodianus
- Species: B. sanguineus

Binomial name
- Bodianus sanguineus (D. S. Jordan & Evermann, 1903)

Synonyms
- Verriculus sanguineus Jordan & Evermann, 1903

= Bodianus sanguineus =

Species of fish

Bodianus sanguineus, the sunrise wrasse, is a species of wrasse found in Hawaii.

== Description ==
This species reaches a length of 19.0 cm (7.5 in).
