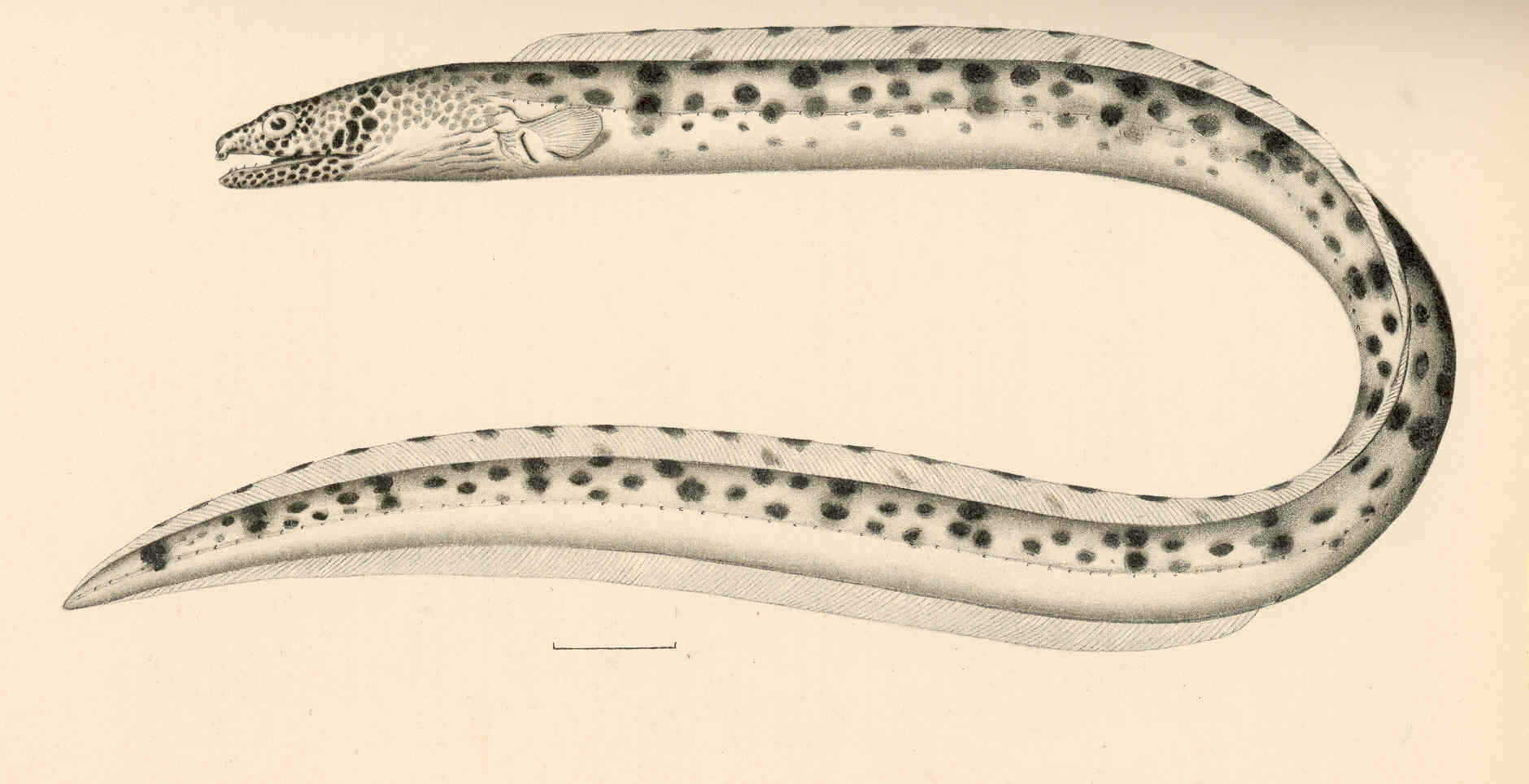

Scientific classification
- Kingdom: Animalia
- Phylum: Chordata
- Class: Actinopterygii
- Division: Teleostei
- Order: Anguilliformes
- Family: Ophichthidae
- Genus: Ophichthus
- Species: O. fowleri

Binomial name
- Ophichthus fowleri (D. S. Jordan & Evermann, 1903)

= Fowler's snake eel =

Species of fish

Ophichthus fowleri, also known as the Fowler's snake eel, is a species of eel in the family Ophichthidae. It is a marine eel which is known from the eastern Central Pacific in Hawaii.

== Etymology ==
The fish's patronym was not identified but it is certainly in honor of American ichthyologist Henry Weed Fowler (1878–1965), of the Academy of Natural Sciences of Philadelphia, and a student of Jordan’s at Stanford University.
