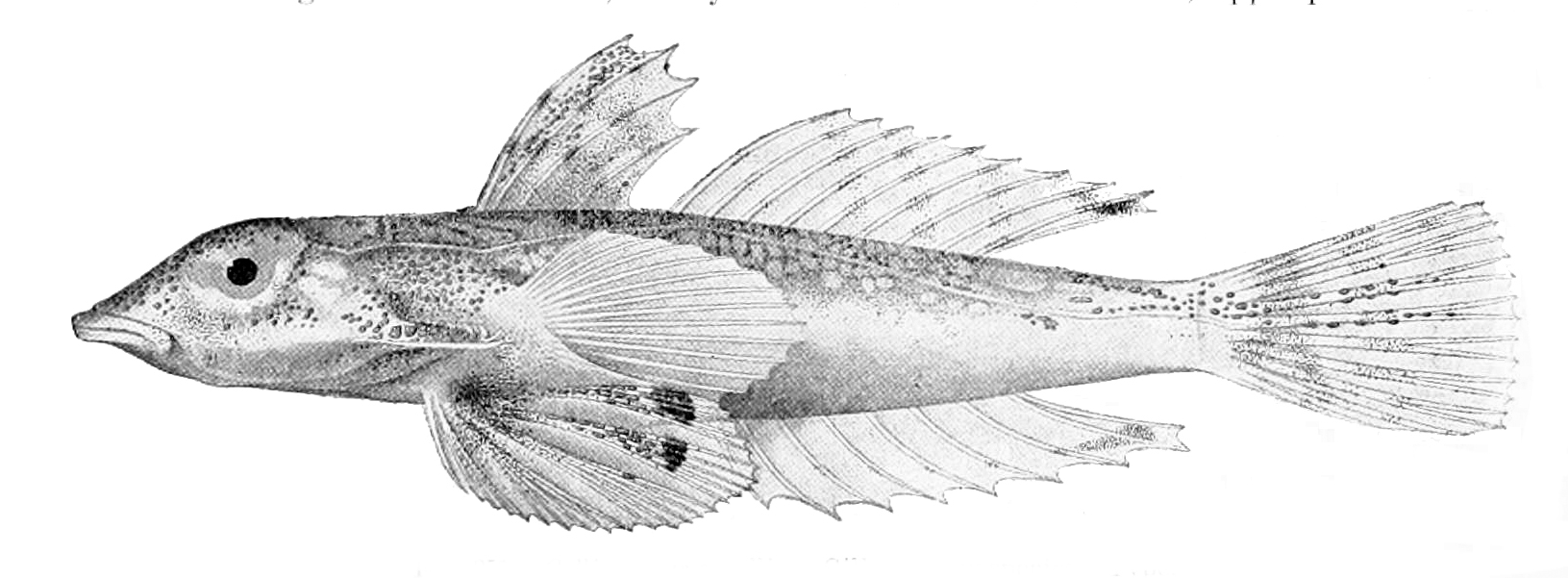

Scientific classification
- Domain: Eukaryota
- Kingdom: Animalia
- Phylum: Chordata
- Class: Actinopterygii
- Order: Callionymiformes
- Family: Callionymidae
- Genus: Synchiropus
- Species: S. corallinus

Binomial name
- Synchiropus corallinus (C. H. Gilbert, 1905)

Synonyms
- Callionymus corallinus Gilbert, 1905; Paradiplogrammus corallinus (Gilbert, 1905)

= Synchiropus corallinus =

Species of fish

Synchiropus corallinus, the exclamation point dragonet, is a species of fish in the dragonet family Callionymidae. It is found in the Pacific Ocean.

== Description ==
This species reaches a length of 3.7 cm (1.5 in).
