= Uropterygius polyspilus =

Conservation status
- Least Concern (IUCN 3.1)

Scientific classification
- Kingdom: Animalia
- Phylum: Chordata
- Class: Actinopterygii
- Order: Anguilliformes
- Family: Muraenidae
- Genus: Uropterygius
- Species: U. polyspilus

Binomial name
- Uropterygius polyspilus (Regan, 1909)

Species of fish

Uropterygius polyspilus is a moray eel found in coral reefs in the Pacific and Indian Oceans. It is commonly known as the large-spotted snake moray.
