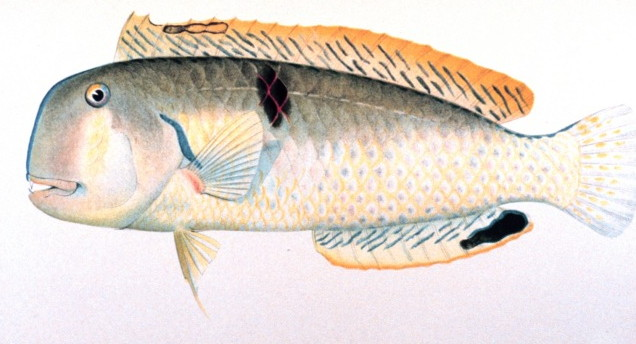

Conservation status
- Least Concern (IUCN 3.1)

Scientific classification
- Kingdom: Animalia
- Phylum: Chordata
- Class: Actinopterygii
- Order: Labriformes
- Family: Labridae
- Genus: Iniistius
- Species: I. baldwini

Binomial name
- Iniistius baldwini (D. S. Jordan & Evermann, 1903)

Synonyms
- Hemipteronotus baldwini Jordan & Evermann, 1903; Xyrichtys baldwini (Jordan & Evermann, 1903)

= Iniistius baldwini =

Species of fish

Iniistius baldwini, the Baldwin's razorfish, is a species of marine ray-finned fish from the family Labridae, the wrasses. it is found in the western-central Pacific Ocean.

== Description ==
This species reaches a length of 20.4 cm (8.0 in).

== Etymology ==
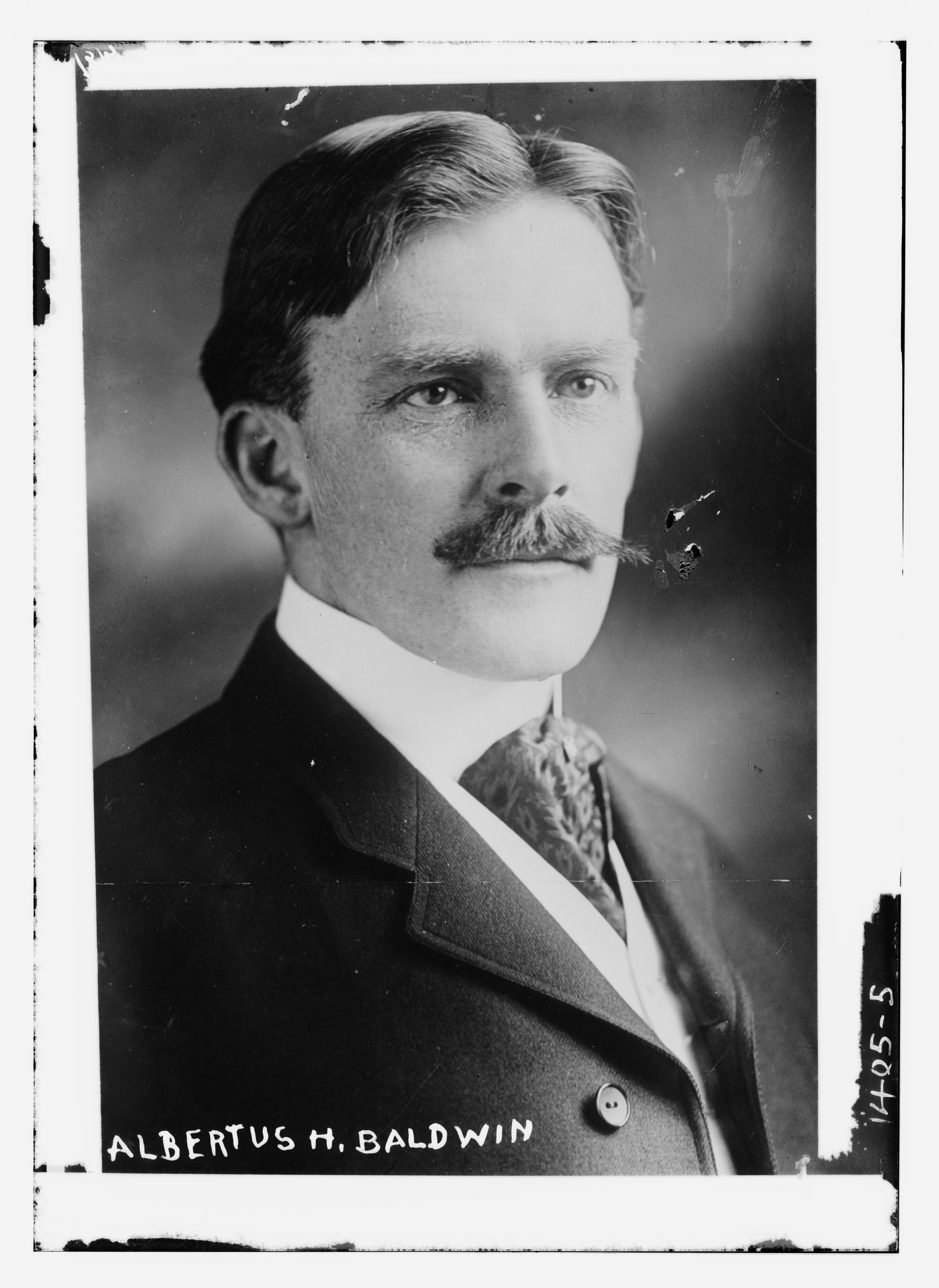
Albertus Baldwin

The fish is named in honor of Albertus Baldwin (1865–1935), who while employed by the U.S. Government's Departments of Agriculture, Interior and Commerce, illustrated scientific reports, with his paintings of American and Hawaiian fishes.
