= Entomacrodus strasburgi =

Conservation status
- Least Concern (IUCN 3.1)

Scientific classification
- Kingdom: Animalia
- Phylum: Chordata
- Class: Actinopterygii
- Division: Teleostei
- Order: Blenniiformes
- Family: Blenniidae
- Genus: Entomacrodus
- Species: E. strasburgi

Binomial name
- Entomacrodus strasburgi Springer, 1967

Species of ray-finned fish

Entomacrodus strasburgi, also called Strasburg's blenny or pāo'o in Hawaiian, is a species of blenny endemic to Hawaii.
