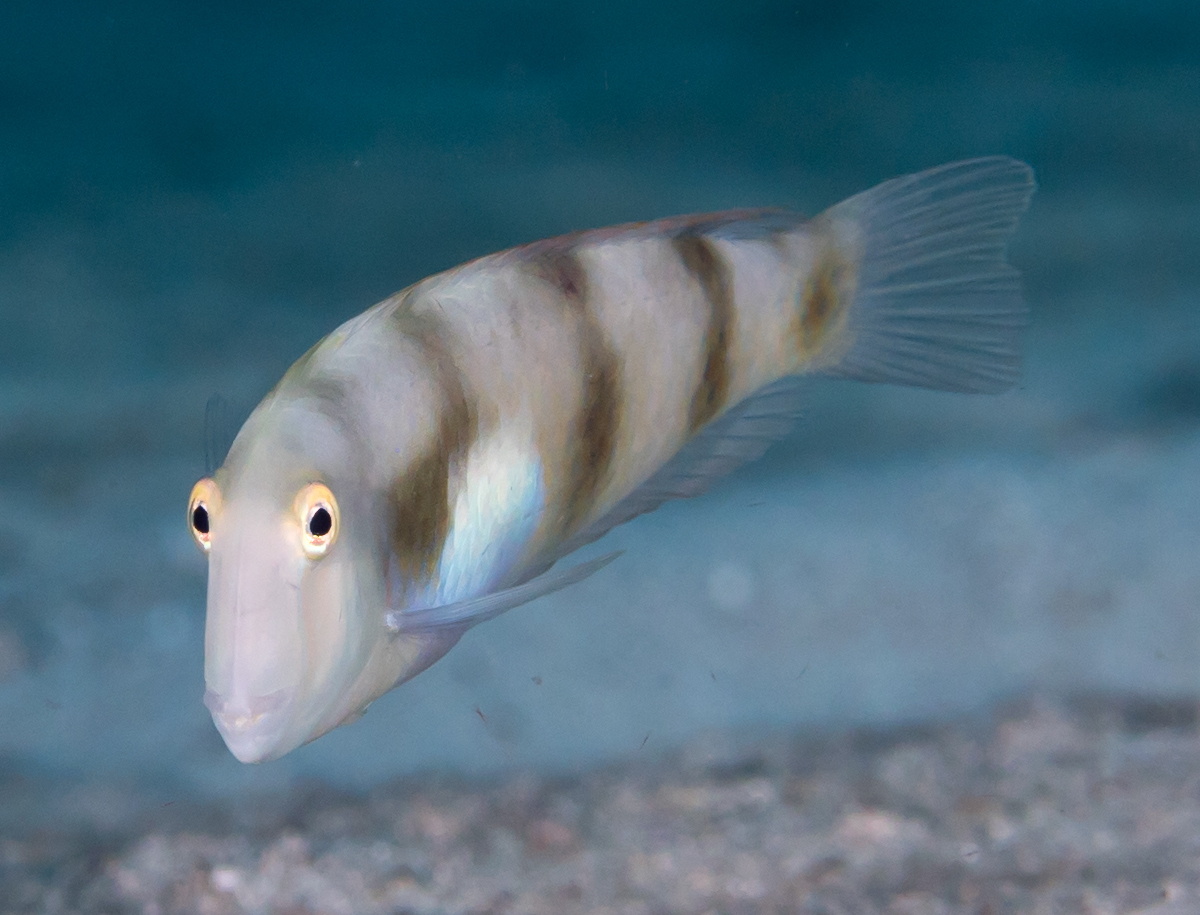

Conservation status
- Least Concern (IUCN 3.1)

Scientific classification
- Kingdom: Animalia
- Phylum: Chordata
- Class: Actinopterygii
- Order: Labriformes
- Family: Labridae
- Genus: Iniistius
- Species: I. aneitensis

Binomial name
- Iniistius aneitensis (Günther, 1862)

Synonyms
- Novacula aneitensis Günther, 1862; Xyrichtys aneitensis (Günther, 1862); Xyrichthys anaitensis (Günther, 1862)

= Iniistius aneitensis =

Species of fish

Iniistius aneitensis, the yellowblotch razorfish, is a species of marine ray-finned fish from the family Labridae, the wrasses. It is found in the Indo-Pacific Ocean.

== Description ==
This species reaches a length of 24.0 cm (9.4 in).
