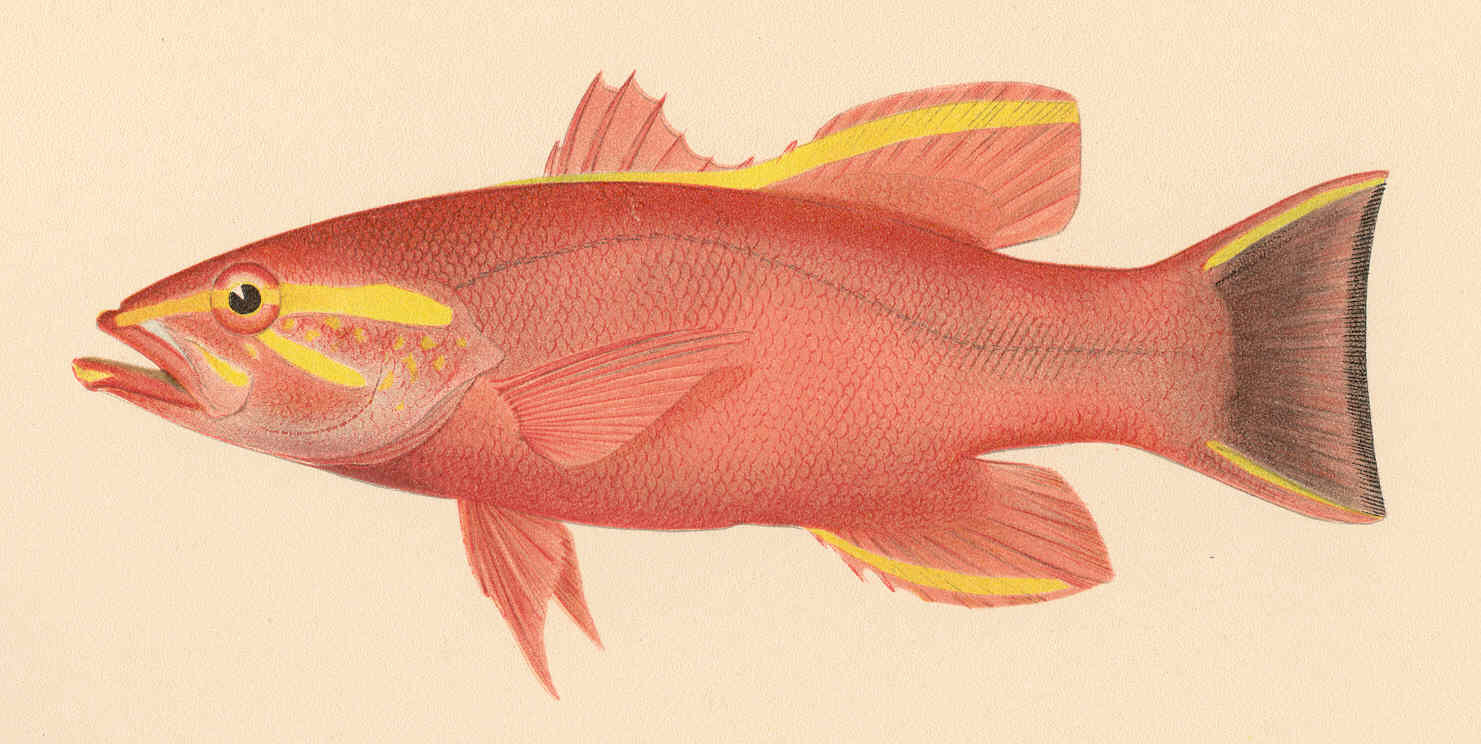

Scientific classification
- Kingdom: Animalia
- Phylum: Chordata
- Class: Actinopterygii
- Order: Perciformes
- Family: Liopropomatidae
- Genus: Liopropoma
- Species: L. aurora

Binomial name
- Liopropoma aurora (Jordan & Evermann, 1903)

= Liopropoma aurora =

Species of fish

Liopropoma aurora is a species of Perciformes in the family Liopropomatidae It is commonly known as the Sunrise basslet, or Sunset basslet, and is a species of deep-reef basslet endemic to the Hawaiian Islands.

== Description ==
Liopropoma aurora is a stout fish with a slightly elevated back and a long, pointed head. The mouth is large with a projecting lower jaw. The maxillary reached the posterior margin of the pupil. The teeth are arranged in bands on the jaws, vomer, and palatines. The preopercle is slightly dentate, and the opercle ends in a broad flap with a weak flat spine. The caudal peduncle is deep and the fins are relatively small.

This species is pale rosy dorsally and paler pink ventrally. A bold sulfur-yellow stripe runs from the upper jaw through the eye and into the opercular opening. A secondary yellow stripe can appear across the cheek and posterior maxillary. They have a yellow lower jaw tip. The dorsal fin is pale rosy while the caudal fin is dark rosy with a blackish-red edge and greenish-yellow margin lines. The head and nape has a greenish-yellow vermiculation. However in alcohol, the body is a pale yellowish white with distinct brown spots and white specks.

The head is approximately 63.5 mm as the body length is about 21 mm long. The snout length is about 15.9 mm. the Liopropoma aurora has a scale count of 5-55-22.

The species is rarely captured and recovered from the stomachs of moray eels. Its diet consists of small crustaceans and reef-associated organisms. Reproductive behavior is not well documented but is suggested to follow patterns typical of serranids. Liopropoma aurora is closely related to Liopropoma lunulatum, which does not occur in Hawaii. Both species share yellow striping through the eye and fin banding, but they have different dorsal ray counts and caudal fin morphology.

== Distribution and habitat ==
Liopropoma aurora is endemic to the Hawaiian Islands having records from Honolulu and Hilo. It inhabits deep reef environments, typically between 21 and 184 m, though have been observed at depths greater than 200 m. The species is engybenthic, living over hard substrates with holes, reef slabs, and crevices. Photographs were taken by the Hawaiʻi Undersea Research Laboratory submersibles Makali‘i and Pisces V at depths of 162–183 m.

== Human use and cultural significance ==
Liopropoma aurora has little importance to fisheries. Occasionally they were collected for the aquarium trade. Its rarity and endemic status shows a symbolic importance in Hawaiian reef biodiversity.

== Conservation ==
The species was not yet assessed by the International Union for Conservation of Nature (IUCN). There are some potential threats such as habitat degradation, deep reef disturbance, and over-collection for aquariums. Conservation measures can be done with protection within Hawaiian marine reserves and broader reef conservation initiatives.
