= Cosmocampus balli =

Ball's pipefish

Conservation status
- Critically endangered, possibly extinct (IUCN 3.1)

Scientific classification
- Kingdom: Animalia
- Phylum: Chordata
- Class: Actinopterygii
- Division: Teleostei
- Order: Syngnathiformes
- Family: Syngnathidae
- Genus: Cosmocampus
- Species: C. balli

Binomial name
- Cosmocampus balli Fowler, 1925

Synonyms
- Corythoichthys balli Fowler, 1925; Syngnathus balli Fowler, 1925

Species of fish

Cosmocampus balli (Ball's pipefish) is a species of fish of the family Syngnathidae. It is endemic to Hawaii, with observations off Oahu and Kauai. It lives in shallow, protected coral reef or rocky habitats, where it can grow to lengths of 7 centimetres (2.8 in). Although little is known about its feeding habits, it is expected to consume small crustaceans, similar to other pipefishes. This species is ovoviviparous, with males carrying eggs and giving birth to live young. Males can brood at 4.5 centimetres (1.8 in).

== Etymology ==
The specific name honours the American zoologist Stanley Crittenden Ball (1885-1956) in acknowledgement of his "interest in the fishes of Oceania".
