= Cantherhines verecundus =

Scientific classification
- Kingdom: Animalia
- Phylum: Chordata
- Class: Actinopterygii
- Order: Tetraodontiformes
- Family: Monacanthidae
- Genus: Cantherhines
- Species: C. verecundus

Binomial name
- Cantherhines verecundus Jordan, 1925

Synonyms
- Cantherines verecundus Jordan, 1925

Species of fish

Cantherhines verecundus, the shy filefish, is a marine fish in the family Monacanthidae (filefishes) that can be found in Hawaiian waters. It is one of the many species of Filefish, but far less common (1). Specimens have been caught in various ways in the shallow waters of Oahu (1).

== Description ==
“... Soft dorsal fin rays 33-36; anal fin r~<30-32; pectoral fin rays 12 or 13 (usually 13); vertebrae 7 + 12; head length 2.8-2.95 in SL; snout length 3.25-3.55 in SL; first dorsal spine of medium length, 1.5-1.7 in head length, originating over anterior half of eye and folding into a moderately deep groove in back when depressed; dorsal spine covered by many longitudinal rows of minute asperities, with two rows of somewhat enlarged parbs on anterior face and one on each posterolateral edge” (1)

“Cantherhines verecundus is very closely related to C. rapanui of Easter Island, differing in its smaller size, longer first dorsal spine, lower average number of dorsal and anal rays, usually 13 instead of 12 pectoral rays, and a ground color which is more gray than brown or olivaceous.” (1).

Their max length is approximately 12.5 cm (2). The species has a varied diet, consisting of various species of sea sponges, multiple types of algae, and even small crustaceans (1).

== Distribution and habitat ==
This species is not only native to Hawaii, but endemic, and is only found in the waters around the islands, at a depth range of 14-92 meters (2). It is specifically found only in the waters surrounding Oahu (1)
