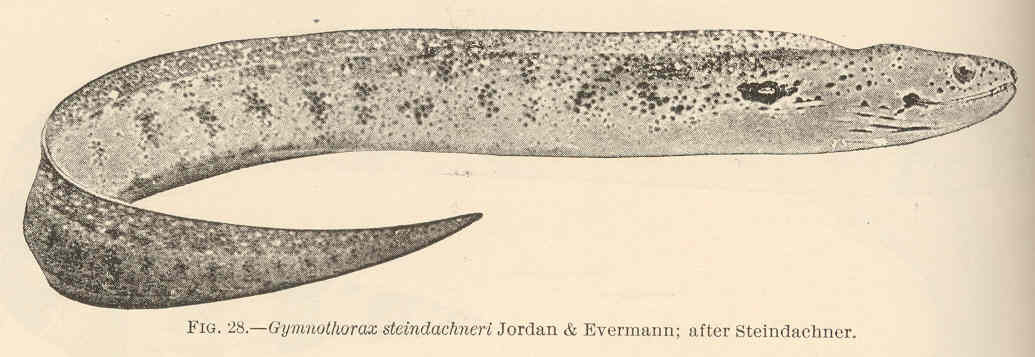

Scientific classification
- Kingdom: Animalia
- Phylum: Chordata
- Class: Actinopterygii
- Division: Teleostei
- Order: Anguilliformes
- Family: Muraenidae
- Genus: Gymnothorax
- Species: G. steindachneri

Binomial name
- Gymnothorax steindachneri D. S. Jordan & Evermann, 1903

= Brown speckled eel =

Species of fish

Gymnothorax steindachneri, the brown speckled eel, Steindachner's moray eel, or puhi in Hawaiian, is a moray eel found in coral reefs in the eastern central Pacific Ocean, around Hawaii. It was scientifically described by David Starr Jordan and Barton Warren Evermann in 1903. This species is endemic to the Hawaiian Islands and is rare in shallow reefs around the main Hawaiian Islands but are commonly found in the Northwest Hawaiian Islands only ranging as far as south of Oʻahu.

== Description ==
The Steindachner's moray eel has almost a cone shaped head with straight jaws. It has a cream color with brown spots and lines on the throat. Near their gills, it has dark spots and its fins are outlined in white. It can grow up to 3 ft (0.91 m).

== Distribution and habitat ==
The Steindachner’s Moray Eel is endemic to Hawaii and can be found around O'ahu up to the Northwestern Hawaiian Islands. It is often found in shallow reefs with depths up to 15–100 ft (4.6–30.5 m).

== Diet and Behavior ==
Steindachner's moray eels mostly hide under rocks or caves during the day but at night is when they come out to hunt for food. They are a predatory fish that hunts and eats small fishes and small invertebrates such as shrimps and crabs.
