= Torquigener randalli =

Scientific classification
- Kingdom: Animalia
- Phylum: Chordata
- Class: Actinopterygii
- Order: Tetraodontiformes
- Family: Tetraodontidae
- Genus: Torquigener
- Species: T. randalli

Binomial name
- Torquigener randalli Hardy, 1983

Species of fish

Torquigener randalli, commonly known as Randall's puffer, is a fish of the pufferfish family Tetraodontidae native to the waters around Hawaii.
