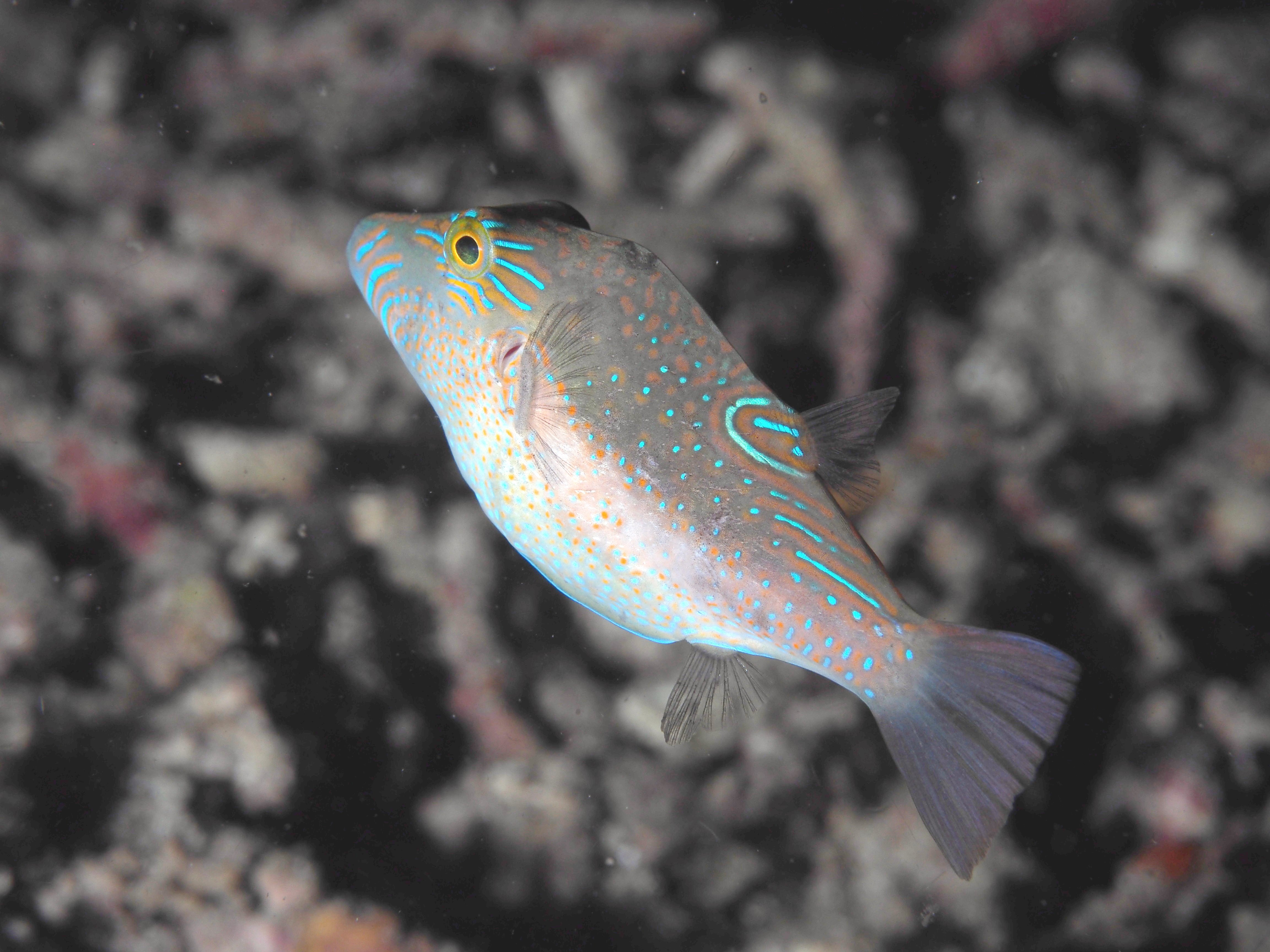

Conservation status
- Least Concern (IUCN 3.1)

Scientific classification
- Kingdom: Animalia
- Phylum: Chordata
- Class: Actinopterygii
- Order: Tetraodontiformes
- Family: Tetraodontidae
- Genus: Canthigaster
- Species: C. epilampra

Binomial name
- Canthigaster epilampra (Jenkins, 1903)

Synonyms
- Tropidichthys epilamprus

= Canthigaster epilampra =

Species of fish

Canthigaster epilampra, known as the lantern toby, is a species of pufferfish in the family Tetraodontidae. It is an Indo-Pacific species that ranges from Christmas Island in the west to the Hawaiian and Society Islands in the east, the Ryukyu Islands in the north, and Tonga and Rarotonga in the south. It inhabits outer reef slopes at a depth of 6 to 60 m (20 to 197 ft), and it is usually seen at depths greater than 24 m (79 ft). It reaches 12 cm (4.7 inches) in total length, and it feeds on mollusks, echinoderms, brachiopods, and algae. The species is usually encountered alone or in pairs.
