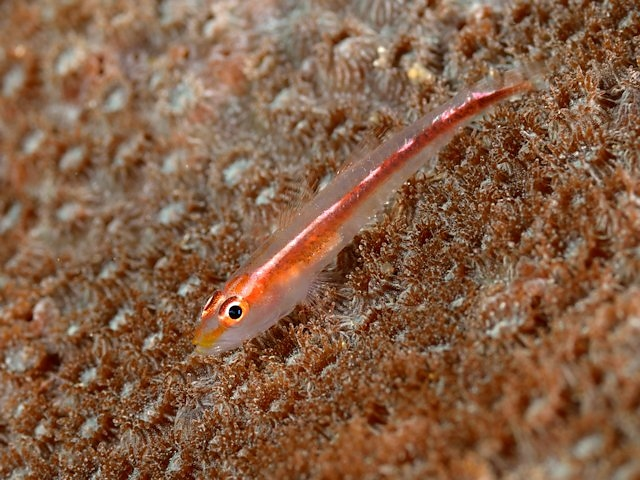

Scientific classification
- Kingdom: Animalia
- Phylum: Chordata
- Class: Actinopterygii
- Order: Gobiiformes
- Family: Gobiidae
- Genus: Pleurosicya
- Species: P. micheli

Binomial name
- Pleurosicya micheli Fourmanoir, 1971

= Pleurosicya micheli =

Species of fish

Pleurosicya micheli, commonly known as Michel's ghost goby or stony coral ghost goby, is a species of gobies native to the Indo-Pacific. Pleurosicya micheli is a small fish that can be found in tropical marine environments where it is abundant with corals. The geographic distribution of Pleurosicya micheli extends from the Indo-west Pacific region, from the Seychelles to Fiji and Hawaiian Islands. They are commonly called Michel's ghost goby, stony coral ghost, cling goby, stony coral ghost goby.

== Description ==
The physical appearance of a ghost goby is that of a tiny fish with a max length of 2.5 cm. The body of this species is translucent with a reddish-brown mid lateral internally; and also has white stripe markings above the vertebral area with red/blue fluorescent eyes. The outer layer of this fish also has a reddish-brown hue along the sides of the fish and the face. The body depth at the anus measures between 5 and 7.1 times in standard length. The total dorsal fin is 6–7 spines and 7–8 soft rays, while anal fin has 1 spine and 7–9 soft rays. Furthermore, the sides of the nape have 8–12 scale rows, and there are 22–28 scales in the longitudinal series. The species also lacks predorsal scales but has scales extending on the sides of the nape. Pleurosicya micheli also lay their eggs inside ascidians, which are also commonly called sea squirts.

== Distribution and habitat ==
Pleurosicya micheli can be found in a tropical marine environment in Indo-west Pacific: from the Seychelles to Fiji and the Hawaiian Islands. This species typically inhabits coral reef slopes at depths of 10 to 50 meters, residing in hard coral reefs that provide a place for them to live as well as a protection from potential threats. They usually live in an environment that has temperatures of 24.8 degrees Celsius to 29.3 degrees Celsius. Hard coral reefs can be used as a protection for them because they are tiny species that can hide inside the crevices of a hard coral reef if there is a predator that is trying to harm them. They can occasionally also be found inside a clam's mantle.
