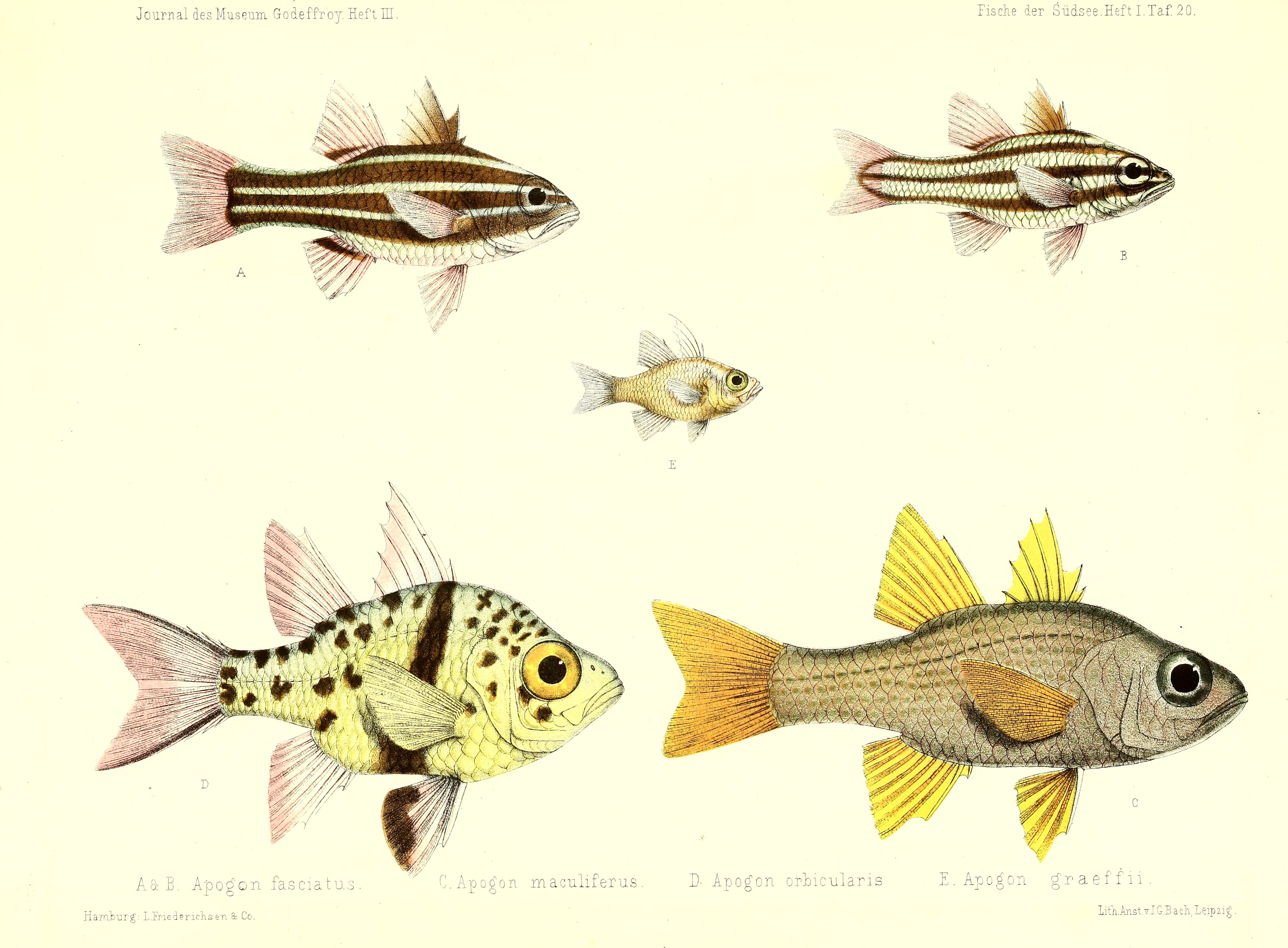
- Illustration of Ostorhinchus maculiferus from Andrew Garrett's Fische der Südsee (1873)

Conservation status
- Least Concern (IUCN 3.1)

Scientific classification
- Kingdom: Animalia
- Phylum: Chordata
- Class: Actinopterygii
- Order: Gobiiformes
- Family: Apogonidae
- Genus: Ostorhinchus
- Species: O. maculiferus

Binomial name
- Ostorhinchus maculiferus (Garrett, 1864)

= Ostorhinchus maculiferus =

Species of fish

Ostorhinchus maculiferus, commonly known as the Hawaiian Spotted Cardinalfish or ʻUpāpalu, is a species of reef-associated cardinalfish in the family Apogonidae. Endemic to the Hawaiian Islands, it occurs across both the main and northwestern island chains, typically inhabiting rocky reefs, caves, and crevices. Known for its pale body coloration with rows of dark spots and large eyes adapted for nocturnal activity, this species plays an important role in reef ecosystem dynamics. Juveniles are often found in tide pools and shallow flats, later transitioning to deeper waters as they mature. ʻUpāpalu holds cultural significance in Hawaiʻi, having traditionally been used as a food fish and caught with nets or traps. Although currently listed as Least Concern by the IUCN, O. maculiferus remains vulnerable to threats such as climate change, habitat degradation, and overfishing. Conservation initiatives, such as the creation of marine protected areas (MPAs), help preserve reef habitats and sustain native species like O. maculiferus.

== Anatomy and morphology ==
Ostorhinchus maculiferus has an elongated, laterally compressed body that grows up to 15 cm (6 in) in length. It is typically pale purplish grey with an orange belly and dusky reddish-orange head. One of its defining features is the presence of six or seven longitudinal rows of dark spots along its body. Its large eyes are well-suited for night activity, and its wide mouth is adapted for feeding on small prey. Unlike some cardinalfish, O. maculiferus has a single dorsal fin with a slight notch and a well-developed caudal fin for swift movement.

The species' short snout and eye size are consistent with adaptations found in many nocturnal reef fishes, helping it to navigate and hunt in low-light environments. Its coloration may also aid in camouflage within its rocky reef habitat.

== Distribution and habitat ==
This species is endemic to the Hawaiian Islands and occurs throughout both the main and Northwestern island chains. It primarily inhabits rocky reefs, crevices, and underwater caves at depths of 1 to 119 meters (3 to 390 feet), but is most often observed between 15 and 30 meters (50 and 100 feet). By day, it hides in reef structures to avoid predators and emerges at night to feed on small crustaceans and plankton. Juveniles are commonly found in tide pools and reef flats, where they use macroalgae and coral rubble for shelter before migrating to deeper waters.

== Cultural significance in Hawai'i ==
In Hawaiian culture, O. maculiferus is known as ʻupāpalu. It was traditionally caught using basket traps, handlines, or net fishing. The fish is noted for its soft, white, and sweet-tasting flesh, with few bones, making it a valued food source. ʻUpāpalu are said to rise to the surface in large numbers on moonlit nights, especially in regions like Puna and Kaʻū, making them easier to catch.

== Conservation status ==
Ostorhinchus maculiferus is currently listed as Least Concern by the IUCN Red List due to its stable population. However, as a Hawaiian endemic, it remains susceptible to habitat loss, coral bleaching, and overfishing. Conservation strategies, particularly the implementation of MPAs, play a critical role in maintaining healthy reef environments and protecting species like O. maculiferus from ecological decline.
