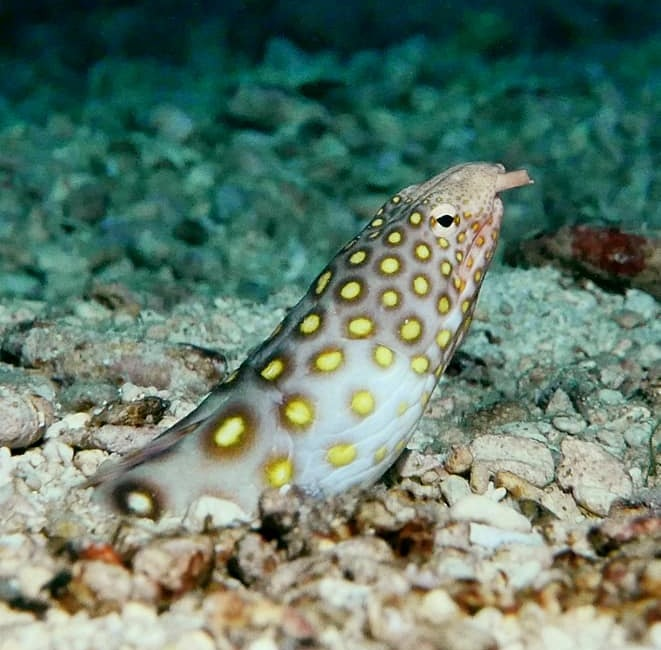

Scientific classification
- Domain: Eukaryota
- Kingdom: Animalia
- Phylum: Chordata
- Class: Actinopterygii
- Order: Anguilliformes
- Family: Ophichthidae
- Genus: Ophichthus
- Species: O. polyophthalmus

Binomial name
- Ophichthus polyophthalmus Bleeker, 1864

= Many-eyed snake eel =

Species of fish

The many-eyed snake eel (Ophichthus polyophthalmus, also known as the large-spotted snake eel, the manyeyed worm eel, the ocellated worm eel, or the yellow-spotted snake eel) is a species of eel in the family Ophichthidae (worm/snake eels). It was described by Pieter Bleeker in 1864. It is a tropical, marine and freshwater-dwelling eel which is known from the Indo-Pacific, including East Africa and the Hawaiian Islands. It dwells at a depth of 2 to 25 metres (6.6 to 82.0 ft), and inhabits sand and rubble sediments near coral reefs. Males can reach a total length of 62.5 centimetres (24.6 in).
