= Torquigener florealis =

Scientific classification
- Kingdom: Animalia
- Phylum: Chordata
- Class: Actinopterygii
- Order: Tetraodontiformes
- Family: Tetraodontidae
- Genus: Torquigener
- Species: T. florealis

Binomial name
- Torquigener florealis (Cope, 1871)

Species of fish

Torquigener florealis is a fish of the pufferfish family Tetraodontidae native to the Western Pacific Ocean.
