= Wilhelm's hawkfish =

Conservation status
- Least Concern (IUCN 3.1)

Scientific classification
- Kingdom: Animalia
- Phylum: Chordata
- Class: Actinopterygii
- Division: Teleostei
- Order: Centrarchiformes
- Family: Cirrhitidae
- Genus: Itycirrhitus; J. E. Randall, 2001
- Species: I. wilhelmi

Binomial name
- Itycirrhitus wilhelmi (Lavenberg & Yáñez-A., 1972)

Synonyms
- Cirrhitus wilhelmi Lavenberg & Yáñez-A., 1972; Amblycirrhitus wilhelmi (Lavenberg & Yañez A., 1972)

Species of fish

Wilhelm's hawkfish (Itycirrhitus wilhelmi) is a species of marine ray-finned fish, a hawkfish belonging to the family Cirrhitidae. It is found in tropical waters at depths of 1 to 55 m (3.3 to 180.4 ft) over rocky substrates. It is only known around Pitcairn Island and Easter Island. This species grows to a length of 12 cm (4.7 in). This species is the only known member of its genus.

== Taxonomy ==
Wilhelm's hawkfish was first formally described in 1972 as Cirrhitus wilelmi with the type locality given as Easter Island in the southern Pacific Ocean. In 2001 John Ernest Randall placed it in a new monotypic genus, Itycirrhitus, as this species and Notocirrhitus splendens differed in having smaller thoracic scales. However, molecular phylogenetic analysis suggests that Itycirrhitus is closer to Neocirrhites than it is to Notocirrhitus. The genus name is a compound of itys meaning "rim" in Greek, a reference to the vivid red scale edges and Cirrhitus the type genus of the family Cirrhitidae, in which genus Lavenberg & Yáñez-A. had originally placed it. The specific name honours Ottmar Wilhelm (1898-1974), the former Director of the Institute of Biology, University of Concepción, who was a proponent of the marine sciences in Chile and who collected type specimen in 1956.

== Description ==
Wilhelm's hawkfish has a snout which is not overly elongated and a deep body. The mouth has an outer row of canine teeth and an inner row of much smaller villiform teeth, the canines are notably larger at the front of the upper jaw and side of the lower jaw. There are two rows of cirri and a flap on the posterior edge of the anterior nostril. The caudal fin is truncate or gently rounded. The upper margin of preoperculum has less than 13 large serrations. The thoractic gill membrane is scaled but the scales are small in comparison to those on the body. This species also has 12-14 soft rays in the dorsal fin but it rarely has 12 or 14. The dorsal fin also has 10 spines with the fourth spine being the longest, the membranes between the spines are weakly incised. The anal fin has 3 spines and 6 soft rays. The pectoral fin has the lower six rays which are robust and unbranched. In alcohol the overall colour is bluish green with five vertical brownish bands along the flanks which become indistinct after crossing the lateral line. The snout and area between the eyes are plain brown and there is a dark spot on the gill cover behind the eye. The maximum published length for this species is 12 cm (4.7 in).

== Distribution and habitat ==
Wilhelm's hawkfish has only known been recorded and specimens collected from the waters off Easter Island and Pitcairn Island They have been recorded at depths between 1 and 55 m (3 ft 3 in and 180 ft 5 in) over rocky substrates.
