= Cirrhitops hubbardi =

Conservation status
- Least Concern (IUCN 3.1)

Scientific classification
- Kingdom: Animalia
- Phylum: Chordata
- Class: Actinopterygii
- Division: Teleostei
- Order: Centrarchiformes
- Family: Cirrhitidae
- Genus: Cirrhitops
- Species: C. hubbardi

Binomial name
- Cirrhitops hubbardi Schultz, 1943

Synonyms
- Amblycirrhitus hubbardi Schultz, 1943

Species of fish

Cirrhitops hubbardi, commonly known as Hubbard's hawkfish or white-spotted hawkfish, is a species of hawkfish in the family Cirrhitidae. It is found in the western Pacific Ocean.

== Taxonomy ==
Cirrhitops hubbardi was first formally described in 1943 as Amblycirrhitus hubbardi by the American ichthyologist Leonard Peter Schultz with the type locality give as the reef at Enderbury Island in the Phoenix Islands. When the genus Cirrhitops was described in 1951 by the South African ichthyologist J. L. B. Smith, he considered A. hubbardi to be a synonym of the redbarred hawkfish (C. fasciatus) and so described the new genus as monotypic. In 1963 John Ernest Randall proved that the colour pattern of this species was consistently different from the redbarred hawkfish, confirming it as a valid species. The population in Japan appears to be separated from the population in the central Pacific and may be a new species.

The specific name honours Commander Dr H. D. Hubbard of the United States Navy, in recognition of the cooperation he gave Schultz while Schultz was aboard the USS Bushnell in the South Pacific.

== Description ==
Cirrhitops hubbardi has the higher 2 and lower 6 pectoral fin rays with no branching. There are 10 spines in the dorsal fin which all have a tassel of cirri at their tip and moderate incisions on the membranes between them, except that there is a deep incision between the fifth and sixth spines. The anal fin has 3 spines and 6 soft rays. The roof of the mouth has a small number of small teeth. The upper three fifths of the margin of the preoperculum has large serrations, the rest of the margin of it is smooth. The dorsal profile of the snout is convex. The caudal fin is truncate and the pelvic fin extends past the anus. This species attains a maximum total length of 25 cm (9.8 in). The overall colour of the head and body is brownish, the head is marked with fine white spots, there are small white blotches on the body and the caudal fin is reddish.

== Distribution and habitat ==
Cirrhitops hubbardi is found in the Western Pacific Ocean and has been recorded from the Ogasawara Islands off southern Japan and the farther east from the Gilbert, Phoenix and Line Islands of Kiribati, Tonga, Rarotonga in the Cook Islands, the Tuamotus and the Pitcairn Islands. The disjunct distribution may mean that they have yet to be discovered or that there may be two species. This carnivorous species is associated with rocky and coral reefs at depths between 2 and 27 m (6 ft 7 in and 88 ft 7 in).
