= Sixband hawkfish =

Conservation status
- Data Deficient (IUCN 3.1)

Scientific classification
- Kingdom: Animalia
- Phylum: Chordata
- Class: Actinopterygii
- Division: Teleostei
- Order: Centrarchiformes
- Family: Cirrhitidae
- Genus: Isocirrhitus; J. E. Randall, 1963
- Species: I. sexfasciatus

Binomial name
- Isocirrhitus sexfasciatus (L. P. Schultz, 1960)

Synonyms
- Cirrhitoidea sexfasciata L. P. Schultz, 1960

Species of fish

The sixband hawkfish (Isocirrhitus sexfasciatus) is a species of marine ray-finned fish, a hawkfish belonging to the family Cirrhitidae. It is found in the western Pacific Ocean. This species grows to 7.8 cm (3.1 in) in standard length. This species is the only known member of its genus.

== Taxonomy ==
The sixband hawkfish was first formally described as Cirrhitoidea sexfasciata in 1960 by the American ichthyologist Leonard Peter Schultz with the type locality given as Airy Island in the Bikini Atoll. In 1963 John Ernest Randall reviewed the family Cirrhitidae and he created the new monotypic genus Isocirrhitus for this species and determined that Oliver Peebles Jenkins' Cirrhitoidea was a synonym of the genus Amblycirrhitus. The sixband hawkfish remains the only species in the genus.

The genus name's derivation was not explained by Randall but it may be iso meaning "equal" and Cirrhitus the type genus of the Cirrhitidae. The specific name sexfasciatus means "six banded".

== Distribution and habitat ==
The sixband hawkfish the Western Pacific Ocean. It occurs around the Cook Islands, in French Polynesia at Rapa Iti, the Gilbert Islands, the Kiribati Line Islands, Marshall Islands; Tonga; United States Minor Outlying Islands at Howland Island and Baker Island. They are found in shallow water at depths between 1 and 11 m (3 ft 3 in and 36 ft 1 in). They are associated with reefs.

== Description ==
The sixband hawkfish is quite similar to the species in the genera Cirrhitops, Amblycirrhitus and Cirrhitichthys but these genera have teeth on the palatine and longer dorsal fin spines. It is also similar to species in Paracirrhitus but these have a single cirrus at the tip of each dorsal fin spine. This species has 10 spines and 11 soft rays in the dorsal fin and 3 spines and 6 soft rays in the anal fin. There is a tuft of cirri at the tip of each spine in the dorsal fin and the membranes between the spines are moderately notched. The uppermost and 5 lower pectoral fin rays are unbranched. The upper third of the edge of the preoperculum has fine serrations, the lower two thirds are smooth. The caudal fin is truncate. This species has a maximum recorded standard length of 7.8 cm (3.1 in).

This is one of the less colourful species of hawkfishes, the overall colour is tan broken by seven wide, vertical blackish bands on the upper body, the first on the nape and the last on the caudal peduncle.
