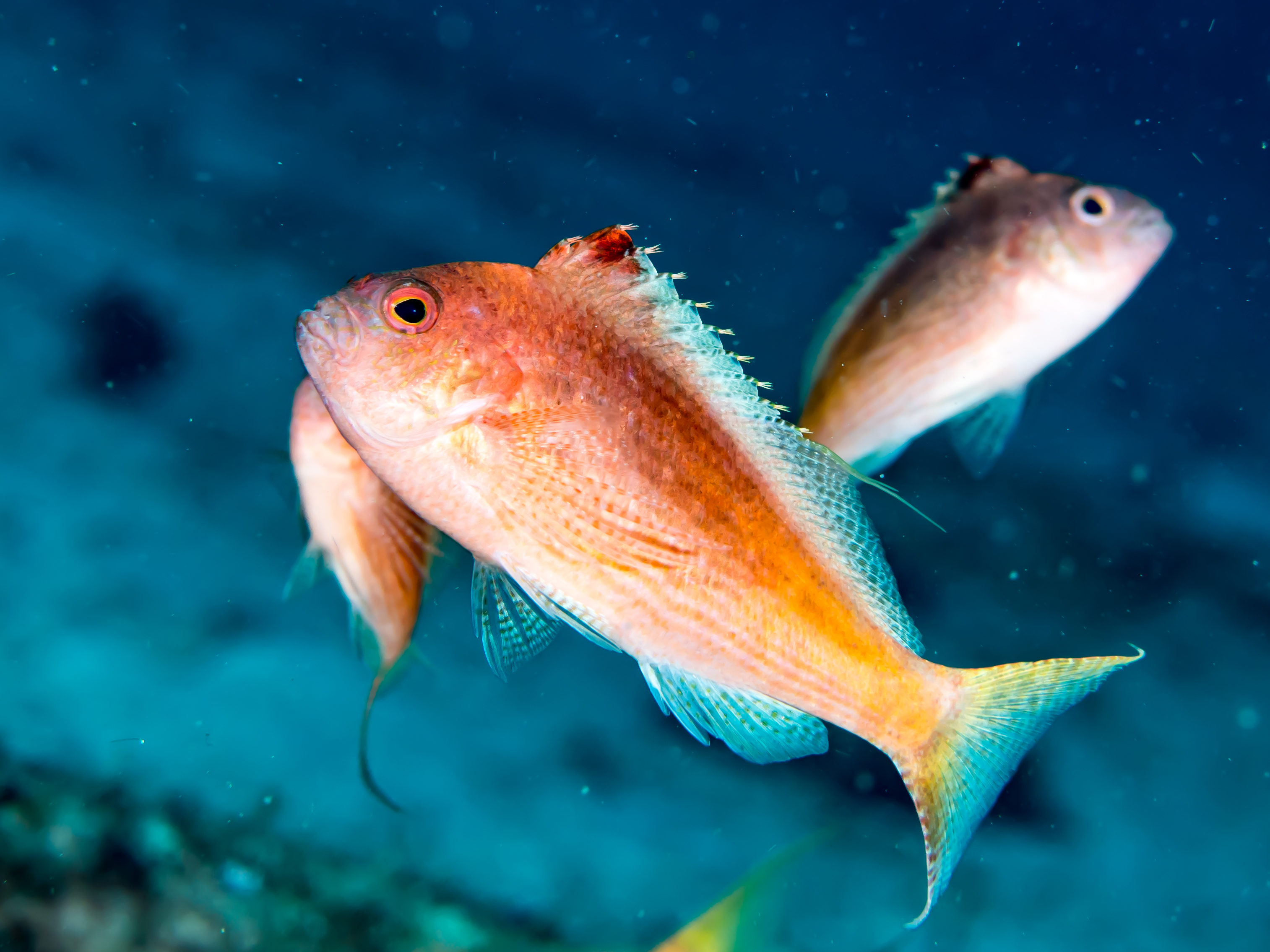
- In Indonesia

Conservation status
- Least Concern (IUCN 3.1)

Scientific classification
- Kingdom: Animalia
- Phylum: Chordata
- Class: Actinopterygii
- Division: Teleostei
- Order: Centrarchiformes
- Family: Cirrhitidae
- Genus: Cyprinocirrhites; S. Tanaka, 1917
- Species: C. polyactis

Binomial name
- Cyprinocirrhites polyactis (Bleeker, 1874)

Synonyms
- Cirrhitichthys polyactis Bleeker, 1874; Cyprinocirrhites ui S. Tanaka, 1917; Cyprinocirrhites stigma Fowler, 1943

= Swallowtail hawkfish =

Species of fish

The swallowtail hawkfish ( Cyprinocirrhites polyactis), also known as the lyretail hawkfish, is a species of marine ray-finned fish, a hawkfish belonging to the family Cirrhitidae. It is found on to tropical reefs in the Indian Ocean and the western Pacific Ocean. This species grows to 15 cm (5.9 in) in total length. It is also found in the aquarium trade. This species is the only known member of its genus.

== Taxonomy ==
The swallowtail hawkfish was first formally described in 1874 as Cirrhitichthys polyactis by the Dutch ichthyologist Pieter Bleeker with the type locality given as Ambon Island. In 1917 the Japanese ichthyologist Shigeho Tanaka described a new species, Cyprinocirrhites ui, which he placed in a new monotypic genus although this was later considered to be a synonym of Cirrhitichthys polyactis the monotypic genus was retained.

=== Etymology ===
The genus name combines cyprinus meaning "carp" or "minnow", Tanaka did not explain why, and cirrhites and alternative spelling of the type genus of the family Cirrhitidae, Cirrhitus. The specific name polyactis means "many rayed", a reference to the count of soft rays in the dorsal fin, higher than any other hawkfish.

== Distribution and habitat ==
The swallowtail hawkfish is found in the Indo-Pacific region. Its range extends from south and eastern Africa from South Africa to Kenya eastwards through the Indian Ocean to Palau, Melanesia and Fiji, north as far as Japan and south to Australia.

In Australia it occurs off Western Australia and along the Great Barrier Reef in Queensland as far south as southern New South Wales.

It can be found at depths between 10 and 132 m (33 and 433 ft). It inhabits steep slopes and small coral heads exposed to the current.

== Description ==
In Japan

The swallowtail hawkfish differs from all the other members of the family Cirrhitidae in two features, the lunate caudal fin with both the upper and lower lobes elongated and the high dorsal fin soft ray count. The dorsal fin contains 10 spines, each spine having numerous cirri at its tip, and 16-17 soft rays, the first ray being elongated, while the anal fin has 3 spines and 6-7 soft rays. The caudal fin is lunate with the uppermost ray of the upper lobe and the lowest ray of the lower lobe extended into filaments. The lower pectoral fin rays are longer than the others. This species attains a maximum total length of 15 cm (5.9 in).

The overall colour of this fish is orange to brownish-orange, frequently with orange-red to brownish blotches.

== Biology ==
Juvenile, in Kenya

The swallowtail hawkfish, unlike other hawkfishes which are mostly benthic, this species stays in the water column several metres above the substrate It preys largely on pelagic crustaceans, copepods and other zooplankton. It may be a protogynous hermaphrodite but further study is needed to confirm this.

== Aquarium ==
The swallowtail hawkfish is occasionally found in the aquarium trade.

== Gallery ==
Closeup, in Kenya

South Africa

Taiwan

Queensland, Australia
