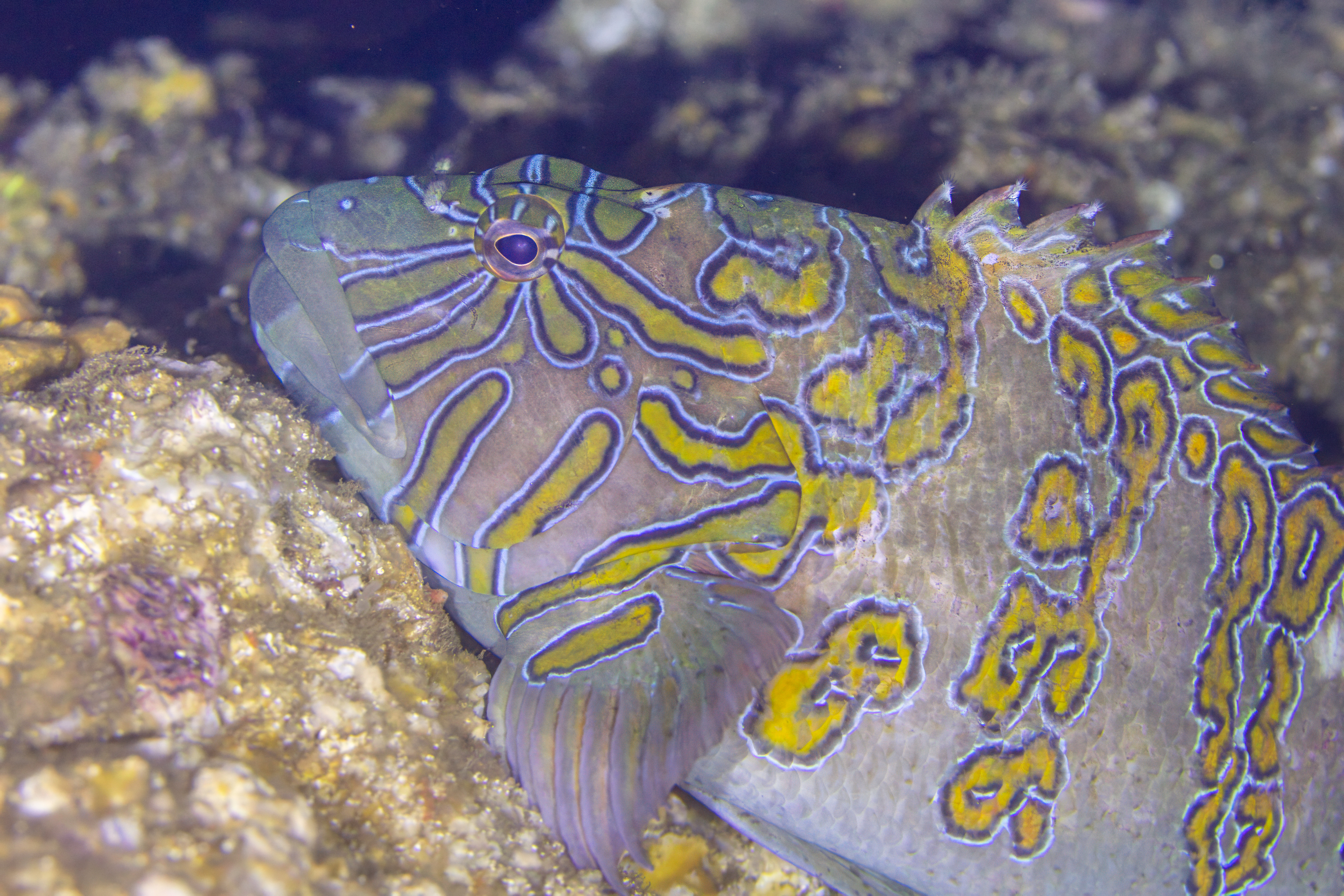
- In the Galápagos Islands

Conservation status
- Least Concern (IUCN 3.1)

Scientific classification
- Kingdom: Animalia
- Phylum: Chordata
- Class: Actinopterygii
- Division: Teleostei
- Order: Centrarchiformes
- Family: Cirrhitidae
- Genus: Cirrhitus
- Species: C. rivulatus

Binomial name
- Cirrhitus rivulatus Valenciennes, 1846

Synonyms
- Cirrhitus betaurus Gill, 1862

= Giant hawkfish =

Species of fish

The giant hawkfish (Cirrhitus rivulatus), also known as the hieroglyphic hawkfish, is a species of marine ray-finned fish, a hawkfish belonging to the family Cirrhitidae. It is a marine fish and the largest of the hawkfish family with maximum size of 60 cm (24 in) in total length. It is found in the eastern Pacific Ocean.

== Taxonomy ==
The giant hawkfish was first formally described in 1846 by the French zoologist Achille Valenciennes with the type locality given as the Galápagos Islands. The specific name rivulatus meaning "marked by irregular streaks", a reference to the black edged, golden-brown markings on the body with thin cobalt-blue surrounds.

== Distribution and habitat ==
The giant hawkfish is endemic to the eastern Pacific Ocean. It occurs from southern Baja California and the northern Sea of Cortez to Ecuador, including all of the offshore islands in that region. It is found on reefs in shallow waters at depths down to 30 m (98 ft). The juveniles occur in the surge zone and in tidal pools.

== Description ==
In the Galápagos

This species attains a maximum total length of 60 cm (24 in) and a maximum published weight of 4.2 kg (9.3 lb), although the International Game Fish Association recognises the largest specimen as 5.58 kg (12.3 lb) caught in 2019 off Ecuador. It is the largest species in the hawkfish family.

The giant hawkfish has a deep body which is not highly laterally compressed. They have large heads with a blunt snout and have a fringe of cirri on the posterior margin of the anterior nostril. They have a moderately large mouth with two types of teeth, an outer row of canines and an inner row of villiform teeth. There are also teeth on the centre and sides of the roof of the mouth. The upper margin of the preoperculum either has small serrations or is smooth and the gill cover has 2 flattened spines. They have a continuous dorsal fin which has 10 spines, the membranes between the spines having deep notches and the tip of each spine has a large tuft of cirri, and 11-12 soft rays with a small incision separating the spiny portion from the soft rayed portion. The anal fin contains 3 spines and 5-7 soft rays. The caudal fin is truncate. The lower 7 pectoral fin rays are robust, with deeply incised membranes and these are notably longer than other pectoral fin rays. The upper 1 and lower 7 pectoral fin rays are unbranched. The pelvic fin has a single spine and 5 soft rays and has its origin behind the base of the pectoral fin. The scales are smooth, the intraorbital space lacks scales and there are fewer than 12 irregular scale rows, made up of small scales, on the cheeks. There are 41-49 scales on the lateral line.

The overall colour is greyish brown with 5 vertical bars on the body, each made up of a complex of golden brown markings, each with a black margin which in turn has narrow bright blue edges. The head has thick, golden-brown bands which also have black margins bordered by slender blue edges, radiating out from the eyes. Most individuals have a pair of white spots on the posterior part of the back. The juveniles have an overall white body marked with dark brown bars.

== Biology ==
Juvenile

The giant hawkfish is a solitary, benthic species which lies still on rock ledges where its body pattern camouflages it against the rocks. It is a predator which feeds on small fishes and crustaceans. When sitting on the rocks it perches on its pectoral fins. They undertake seasonal movements, in southern Baja California they move into shallower water when the water temperature rises, typically in May.
