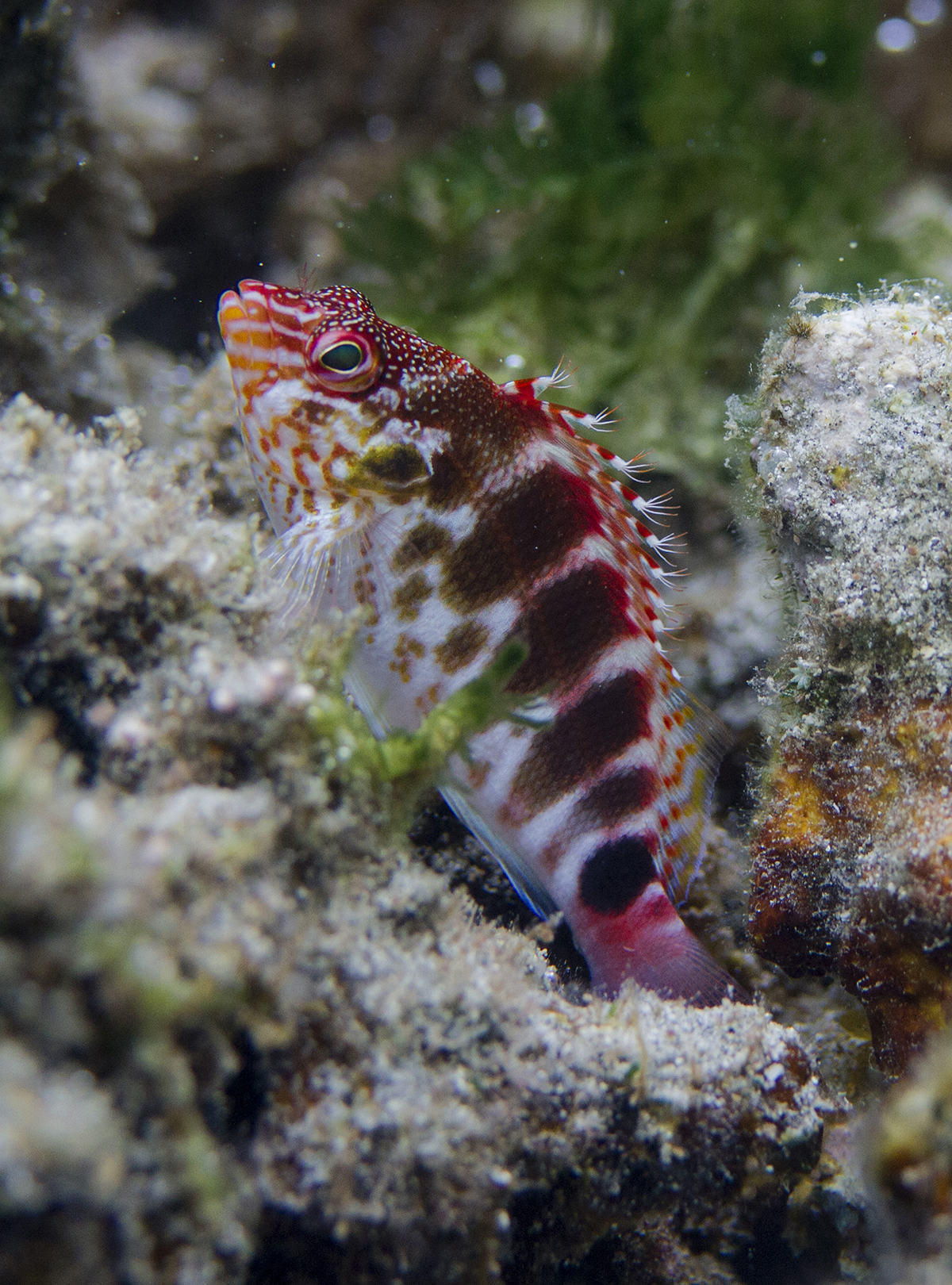
- Réunion

Scientific classification
- Kingdom: Animalia
- Phylum: Chordata
- Class: Actinopterygii
- Order: Centrarchiformes
- Family: Cirrhitidae
- Genus: Cirrhitops
- Species: C. mascarenensis

Binomial name
- Cirrhitops mascarenensis Randall & Schultz, 2008

= Cirrhitops mascarenensis =

Species of fish

Cirrhitops mascarenensis is a species of marine ray-finned fish, a hawkfish belonging to the family Cirrhitidae. It is found in the southwestern Indian Ocean.

== Taxonomy ==
Cirrhitops mascarenensis was first formally described in 2008 by John Ernest Randall and Jennifer K. Schultz with the type locality given as a pass close to the Trou d'Eau Douce off the eastern coast of Mauritius. The Cirrhitops hawkfish found in the southwestern Indian Ocean were regarded as conspecific with those found around the Hawaiian Islands, the redbarred hawkfish (C. fasciatus) but in 2008, Randall and Schultz, described a new species from the south western Indian Ocean based on genetic and morphological analyses. This then resolved the status of the redbarred hawkfish as a species endemic to the Hawaiian Islands. The specific name means "of the Mascarenes", a reference to the islands of Mauritius and Réunion which form part of its range.

== Description ==
Cirrhitops mascarenensis has a dorsal fin which contains 10 spines and 14 soft rays while the anal fin has 3 spines and 6 soft rays. The pectoral fin has 14 rays, although it occasionally has 15. The lower 6 pectoral fin rays are unbranched and robust. The margin of the preoperculum has 14-24 serrations, the number increasing as the fish grows. The caudal fin is weakly emarginate. Its body is red on the back and uppersides and white on the underside. There are five slightly diagonal, reddish brown bars underneath the dorsal fin and a large rhomboid black spot on the front of the caudal peduncle and a dark brown spot on the gill cover. The half of the body below the lateral line has brownish red blotches which are roughly equal in diameter to the eye or its pupil. This species has a maximum recorded total length of 7.5 cm (3.0 in).

== Distribution, habitat and biology ==
Cirrhitops mascarenensis is found in the southwestern Indian Ocean where it has been recorded from Madagascar, Mauritius and Réunion, it has not been recorded from Rodrigues, the easternmost of the Mascarenes. but should be expected from there. This species should have similar habitat preferences and biology to the redbarred hawkfish.
