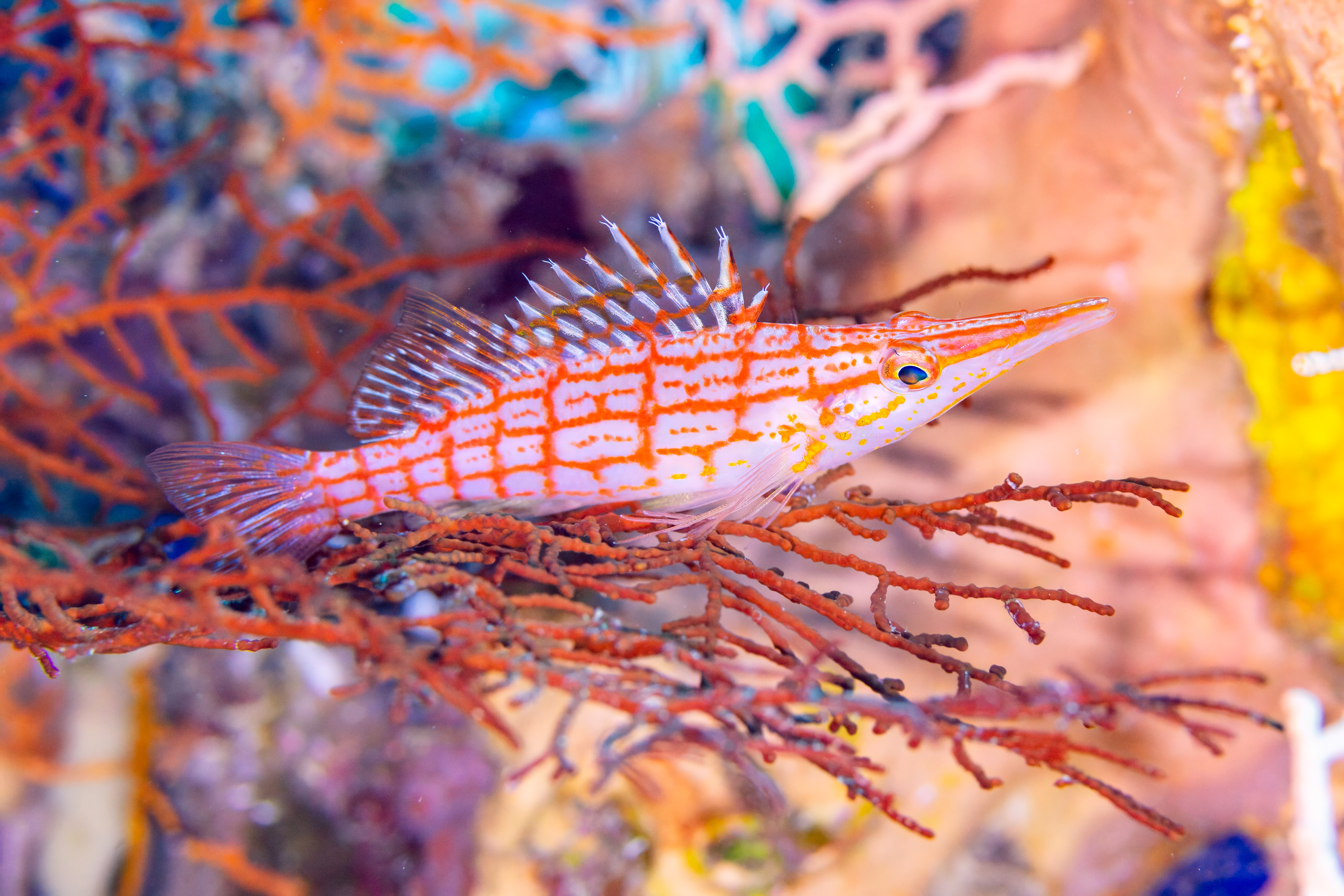
- At Madagascar

Conservation status
- Least Concern (IUCN 3.1)

Scientific classification
- Kingdom: Animalia
- Phylum: Chordata
- Class: Actinopterygii
- Division: Teleostei
- Order: Centrarchiformes
- Family: Cirrhitidae
- Genus: Oxycirrhites; Bleeker, 1857
- Species: O. typus

Binomial name
- Oxycirrhites typus Bleeker, 1857

= Longnose hawkfish =

Species of fish

The longnose hawkfish (Oxycirrhites typus) is a species of marine ray-finned fish, a hawkfish belonging to the family Cirrhitidae. It is found on tropical reefs of the Indian Ocean and the Pacific Ocean, where it can be found at depths around 10 to 100 m (33 to 328 ft). It prefers the steep outer slopes of the reefs amongst gorgonians and black corals. This species can reach 13 cm (5.1 in) in total length. It can also be found in the aquarium trade. It is currently the only known member in its genus.

== Taxonomy ==
The longnose hawkfish was first formally described in 1857 by the Dutch ichthyologist Pieter Bleeker with the type locality given as Ambon Island in Indonesia. Bleeker placed it in the monotypic genus Oxycirrhites.

=== Etymology ===
The genus name is a compound of oxy meaning "sharp" or "pointed" and Cirrhites, an alternative spelling of the type genus of the family Cirrhitidae, Cirrhitus. The specific name typus denotes that it is the type species of its genus.

== Distribution and habitat ==
The longnose hawkfish has a wide Indo-Pacific distribution. In the Indian Ocean it is found from the Red Sea, along the coast of east Africa south to northern Mozambique and Madagascar across the Indian Ocean into the Pacific where it reaches as far east as the Hawaiian Islands and the Society Islands in French Polynesia north to Japan and south to Australia. In Australia it occurs from south west of Barrow Island and at the Scott Reef in Western Australia, the Ashmore Reef in the Timor Sea and from Lizard Island south to Escape Reef in Queensland, as well as occurring at Christmas Island and Cocos (Keeling) Islands. In the eastern Pacific Ocean it is found from the southern tip of Baja California and the central Gulf of California south to Colombia, and at the Revillagigedos, Galapagos, Cocos and Malpelo.

It occurs at depths between 10 and 100 m (33 and 328 ft). It is found on steep outer reef slopes which are exposed to strong currents, living among large gorgonians and black corals.

== Description ==
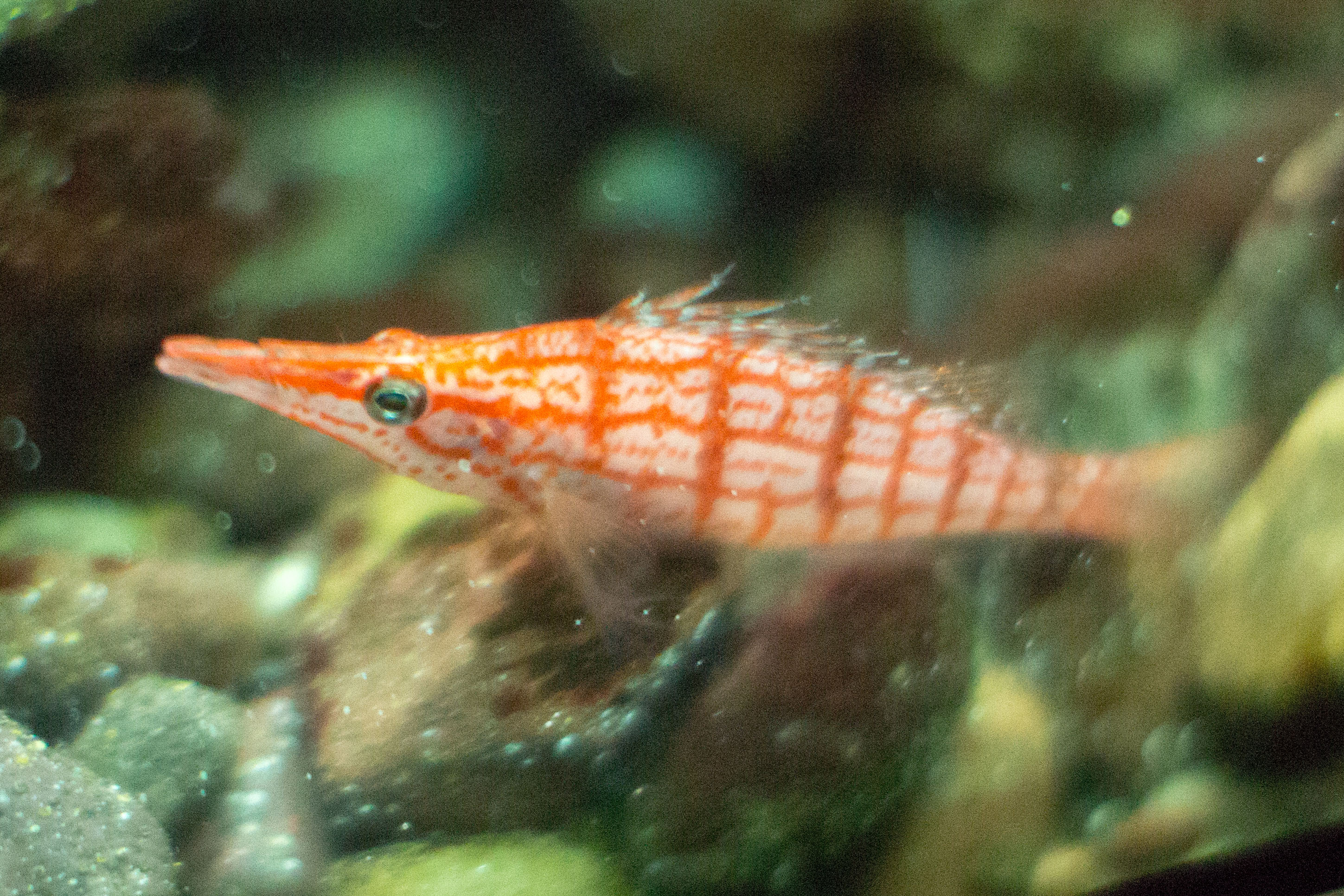
At the Shedd Aquarium

The longnose hawkfish differs from all the other hawkfish species in its elongated snout, the length of the snout fitting roughly twice into the overall length of the head. The canine teeth in the jaws are of uniform size and are only slightly larger than the inner band of villiform teeth. The dorsal fin contains 10 spines and 13 soft rays while the anal fin has 3 spines and 7 soft rays. This fish reaches a maximum total length of 13 centimetres (5.1 in). There is a tuft of cirri at the tip of each dorsal fin spine. The overall colour of the body is whitish overlain with a grid of red horizontal and vertical lines.

== Biology ==
The longnose hawkfish preys on small benthic or planktonic crustaceans. It is uncommon to rare in most of its range and it is a territorial species. They are pelagic spawners which form distinct monogamous pairs to breed.

== Utilisation ==
The longnose hawkfish is common in the aquarium trade.

== Gallery ==
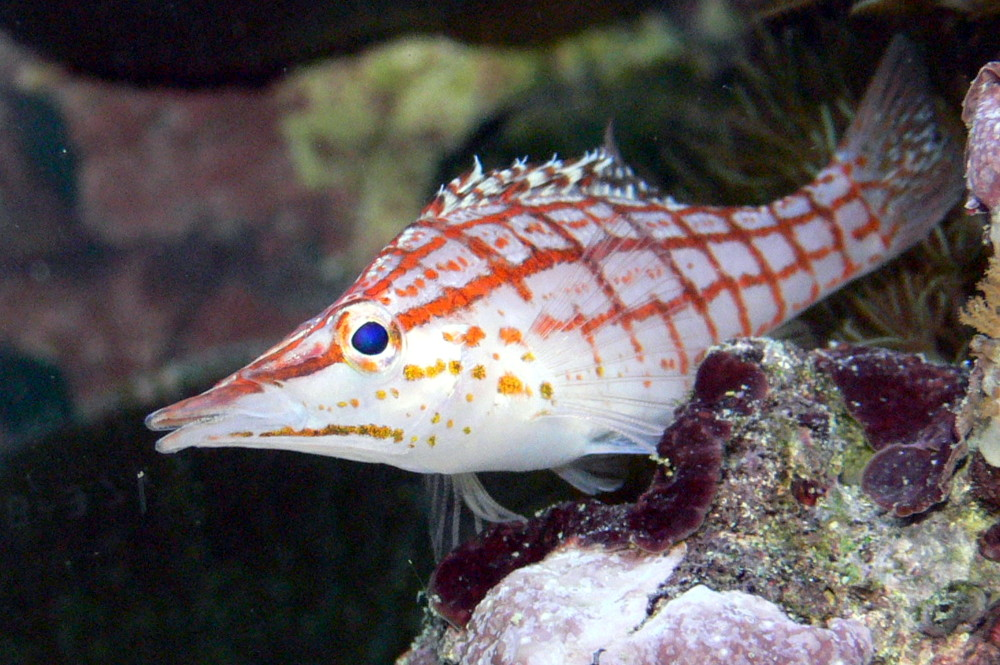
Close up

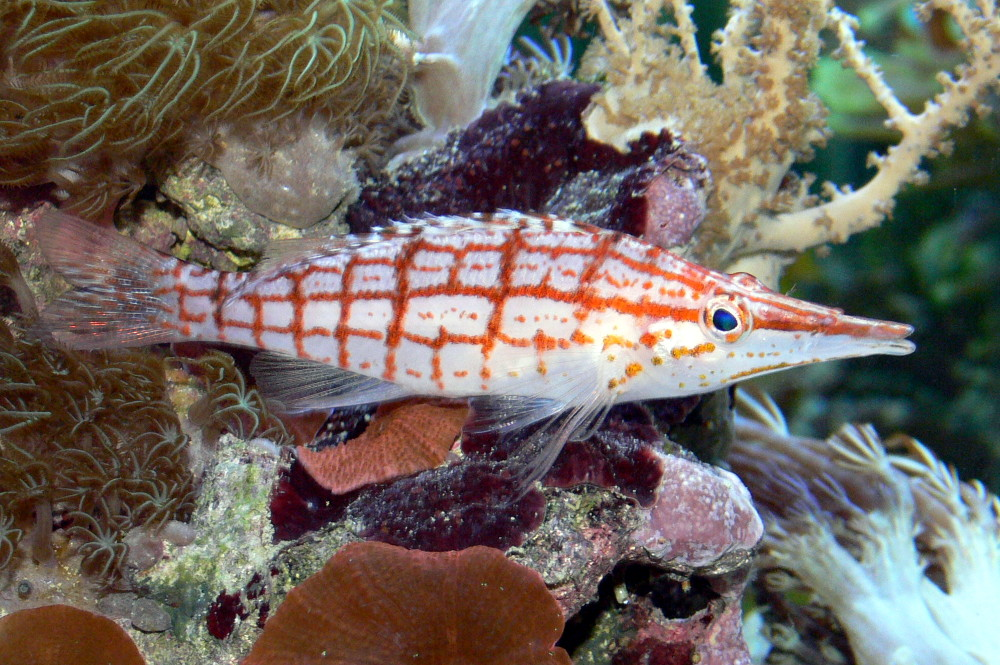
Longnose hawkfish

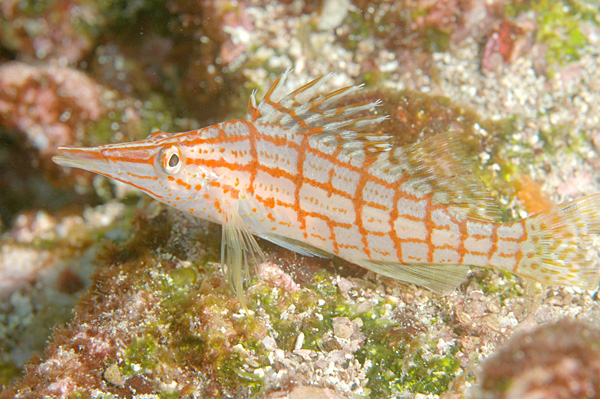
At the Galapagos Islands

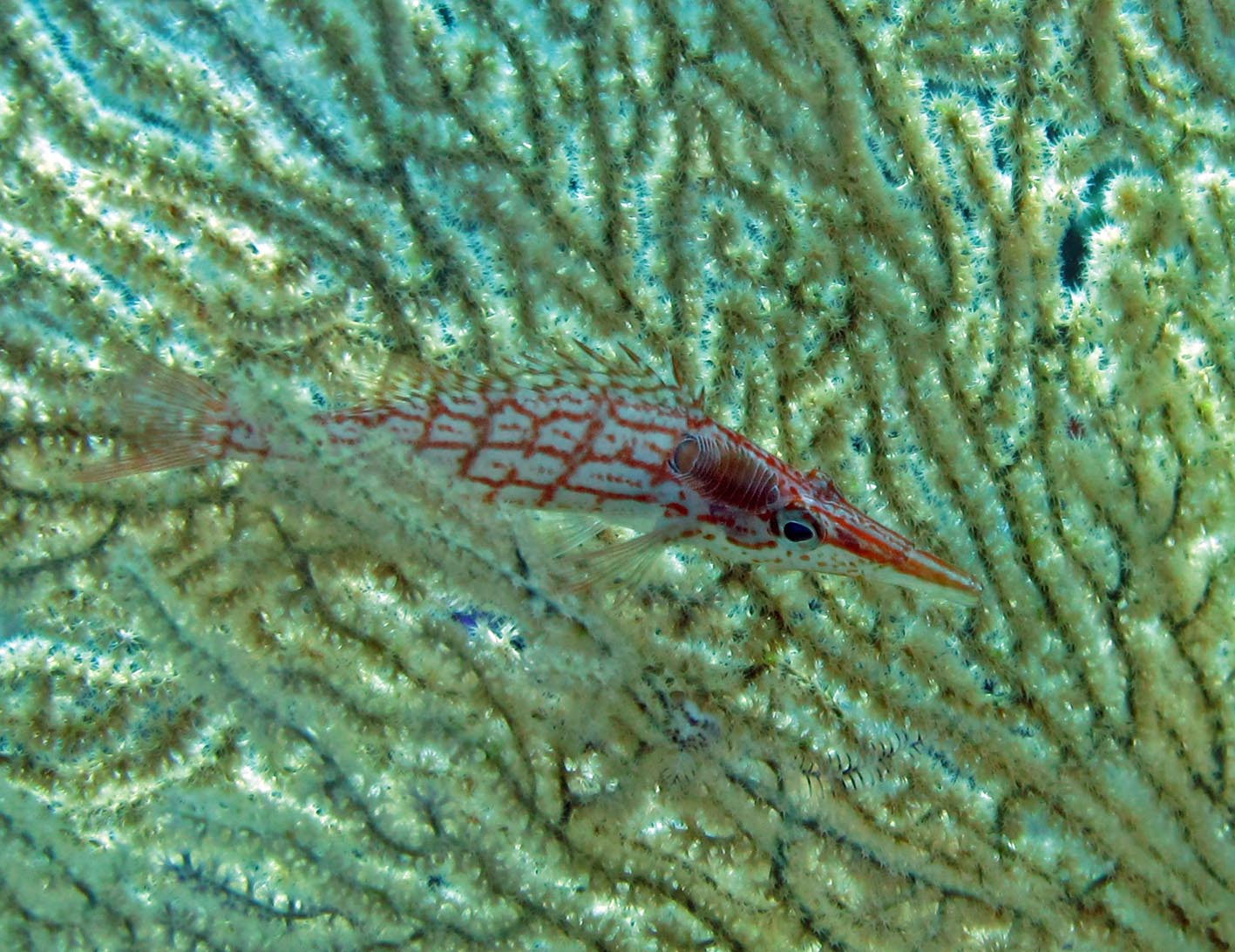
At Raja Ampat, Indonesia
