= Cirrhitops =

- Cirrhitops fasciatus

Scientific classification
- Kingdom: Animalia
- Phylum: Chordata
- Class: Actinopterygii
- Division: Teleostei
- Order: Centrarchiformes
- Family: Cirrhitidae
- Genus: Cirrhitops; J. L. B. Smith, 1951

Type species
- Cirrhites fasciatus E. T. Bennett, 1828

Genus of fishes

Cirrhitops is a genus of marine ray-finned fish, hawkfishes from the family Cirrhitidae. They are found on tropical reefs of the Indian Ocean and the Pacific Ocean.

== Taxonomy ==
Cirrhitops was described as a genus in 1951 by the South African ichthyologist J. L. B. Smith with Cirrhites fasciatus as the type species. When he described the genus Smith stated that it was monotypic as he considered that Cirrhites hubbardi, which had been described in 1941 by the American ichthyologist Leonard P. Schultz, was a synonym of C. fasciatus. The name of the genus has the name of the type genus of the family, Cirrhitus, suffixed with ops meaning that they species in the genus are similar in appearance to the species in Cirrhitus and Cirrhitichthys.

In 1963 John Ernest Randall reviewed the hawkfish family Cirrhitidae and included two species within the genus, C. fasciatus and C. hubbardi. In that review he did note that C. fasciatus had a widely disjunct distribution with populations known from Hawaii and from the Mascarenes. In 2008, in a paper co-authored by Randall and Jennifer K. Schultz, the new species C. mascarenensis was described from the south western Indian Ocean based on genetic and morphological analyses. This then resolved the status of the redbarred hawkfish as a species endemic to the Hawaiian archipelago.

== Species ==
The currently recognized species in this genus are:

Species	Common name	Image
Cirrhitops fasciatus (E. T. Bennett, 1828)	redbarred hawkfish	
Cirrhitops hubbardi (L. P. Schultz, 1943)	whitespotted hawkfish	
Cirrhitops mascarenensis J. E. Randall & J. K. Schultz, 2008	Mascarenes redbarred hawkfish	

== Characteristics ==
Cirrhitops hawkfishes are distinguished within the Cirrhitidae by a number of characters, among these are that the higher 2 and lower 6 pectoral fin rays without branching. They have 14, occasionally 15, spines in the dorsal fin which all have a tassel of cirri at their tip and moderate incisions on the membranes between them, except that there is a deep incision between the fifth and sixth spines. The roof of the mouth has a small number of small teeth. The upper three fifths of the margin of the preoperculum has large serrations, the rest of the margin of it is smooth. The dorsal profile of the snout is convex. The caudal fin is truncate and the pelvic fin extends past the anus.

== Distribution and habitat ==
Cirrhitops consists of three parapatric species, the redbarred hawkfish is now regarded as endemic to Hawaii while the newly described C. mascarenensis has been recorded from Madagascar and the Mascarene Islands in the southwestern Indian Ocean. The third species C. hubbardi has been recorded from the Cook Islands, French Polynesia; Japan, the Phoenix Islands, the Kiribati Line Islands, Pitcairn Island, Tonga and the United States Minor Outlying Islands. They are found on coral reefs.
