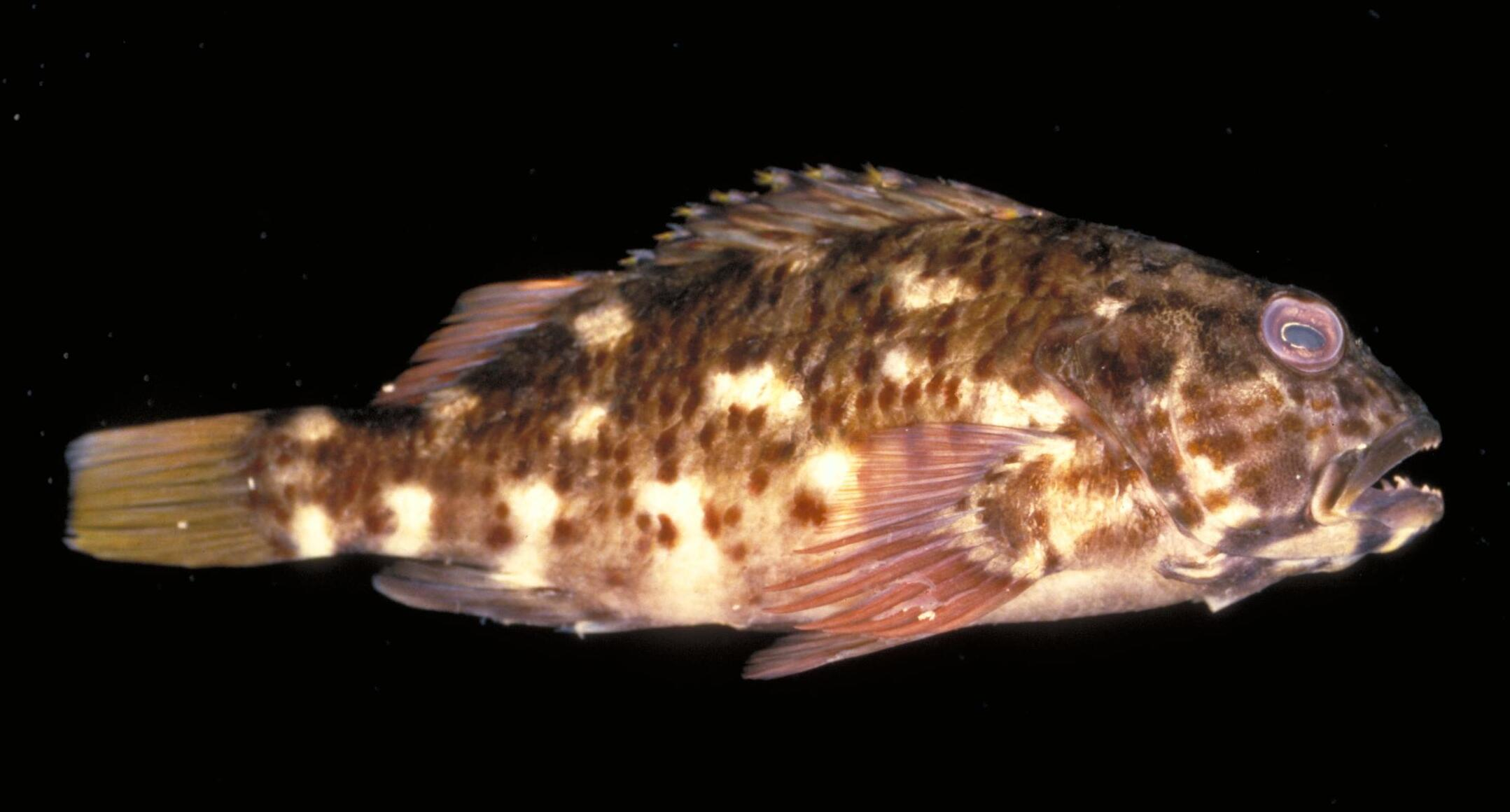

Conservation status
- Least Concern (IUCN 3.1)

Scientific classification
- Kingdom: Animalia
- Phylum: Chordata
- Class: Actinopterygii
- Division: Teleostei
- Order: Centrarchiformes
- Family: Cirrhitidae
- Genus: Cristacirrhitus; J. E. Randall, 2001
- Species: C. punctatus

Binomial name
- Cristacirrhitus punctatus (G. Cuvier, 1829)

Synonyms
- Cirrhitus punctatus G. Cuvier, 1829; Cirrhitus nigropunctatus Schultz, 1950; Cirrhitus mossambicus J. L. B. Smith, 1951

= Blackspotted hawkfish =

Species of fish

The blackspotted hawkfish (Cristacirrhitus punctatus) is a species of marine ray-finned fish, a hawkfish belonging to the family Cirrhitidae. It is native to rocky shores of the western Indian Ocean. This species grows to 17 cm (6.7 in) in total length. This species is the only known member of its genus.

== Taxonomy ==
The blackspotted hawkfish was first formally described in 1829 as Cirrhitus punctatus by the French zoologist Georges Cuvier with the type locality given as Madagascar. In 2001 John Ernest Randall placed it in a new monotypic genus, Cristacirrhitus.

=== Etymology ===
The genus name is a compound of crista meaning "crest", a reference to the ridge of bone over the eye and Cirrhitus the type genus of the family Cirrhitidae, in which genus Cuvier had originally placed it. The specific name punctatus means "spotted", a reference to brown blotches and black spots this species has.

== Distribution and habitat ==
The blackspotted hawkfish is found in the western Indian Ocean on rocky shorelines in South Africa, Mozambique, Madagascar, Mauritius and Réunion.

== Description ==
At Réunion

The black spotted hawkfish has a snout which is not overly elongated and a deep body. The mouth has an outer row of canine teeth and an inner row of much smaller villiform teeth, the canines are notably larger at the front of the upper jaw and side of the lower jaw. There are two rows of cirri and a flap on the posterior edge of the anterior nostril. The caudal fin is truncate or rounded. The lowest 7 pectoral fin rays are unbranched and robust, the pectoral fins are long reaching past the tips of the pelvic fins. The dorsal fin has 10 spines and 11 soft rays while the anal fin has 3 spies and 6 soft rays. There is an obvious bony ridge, starting to the rear of the eye and having a length equal to of half the diameter of the eye.

This species has a maximum published total length of 17 cm (6.7 in). The body is mottled with irregular brown and light brown blotches. On the upper two thirds of the head there are many small blackish spots and a blackish stripe arcing rearwards from the eye.
