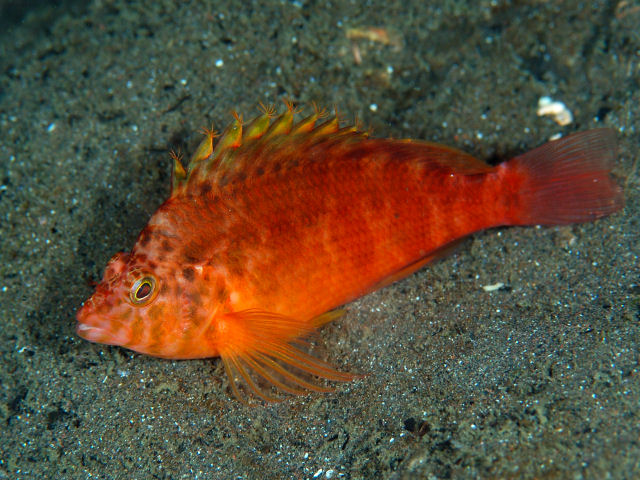
- In Japan

Scientific classification
- Kingdom: Animalia
- Phylum: Chordata
- Class: Actinopterygii
- Division: Teleostei
- Order: Centrarchiformes
- Family: Cirrhitidae
- Genus: Cirrhitichthys
- Species: C. aureus

Binomial name
- Cirrhitichthys aureus (Temminck & Schlegel, 1842)

Synonyms
- Cirrhites aureus Temminck & Schlegel, 1842; Cirrhites gibbosus Guichenot, 1869

= Cirrhitichthys aureus =

Species of fish

Cirrhitichthys aureus, the yellow hawkfish, the golden hawkfish or golden curlyfin, is a species of marine ray-finned fish, a hawkfish belonging to the family Cirrhitidae. It is native to tropical reefs of the Indian Ocean and the western Pacific Ocean.

== Taxonomy ==
Cirrhitichthys aureus was first formally described in 1842 as Cirrhites aureus by Coenraad Jacob Temminck and Herman Schlegel with the type locality given as the outer bays of Nagasaki.

The specific name aureus means “gold”, a reference to its golden yellow colour.

== Distribution and habitat ==
Cirrhitichthys aureus is found in the Indo-Pacific region from India east to Japan and China, it has also been recorded in southern Indonesia. This species is found around rocky cliffs within reefs and is found at depths between 5 and 20 m (16 and 66 ft).

== Description ==
In Taiwan

Cirrhitichthys aureus has a dorsal fin which contains 10 spines and 12 soft rays, the first soft ray is extended. The anal fin has 3 spines and 6 soft rays. The pelvic fin extends past the anus and the caudal fin is weakly emarginate. This species reaches a maximum total length of 14 cm (5.5 in).

The overall colour is yellow to orange with large, indistinct, dusky brown blotches along the back. There is a pair of poorly defined brown spots just above the gill cover. The fins are yellowish in colour with spots on the soft rayed part of the dorsal fin.

== Biology ==
Cirrhitichthys aureus have been shown, at least in captivity, to be able to change sex in either direction. They lay pelagic eggs. Their diet is made up of fishes and crustaceans. In the wild these fish are largely solitary.

== Utilisation ==
Cirrhitichthys aureus are not often collected for the aquarium trade.

At Aqua Park Shinagawa

In captivity
