= Coral hawkfish =

Conservation status
- Least Concern (IUCN 3.1)

Scientific classification
- Kingdom: Animalia
- Phylum: Chordata
- Class: Actinopterygii
- Division: Teleostei
- Order: Centrarchiformes
- Family: Cirrhitidae
- Genus: Cirrhitichthys
- Species: C. oxycephalus

Binomial name
- Cirrhitichthys oxycephalus (Bleeker, 1855)

Synonyms
- List: Cirrhites oxycephalus Bleeker, 1855; Cirrhites grandimaculatus F. Liénard, 1891; Cirrhites murrayi Regan, 1909; Cirrhitichthys corallicola Tee-Van, 1940

Species of fish

The coral hawkfish (Cirrhitichthys oxycephalus), the pixy hawkfish or sharp-headed hawkfish, is a species of marine ray-finned fish, a hawkfish belonging to the family Cirrhitidae. It is native to tropical reefs of the Indian Ocean and the Pacific Ocean. It occasionally is found in the aquarium trade.

== Taxonomy ==
The coral hawkfish was first formally described as Cirrhites oxycephalus in 1855 by the Dutch ichthyologist Pieter Bleeker with the type locality given as Ambon Island.

The specific name is a compound of oxy meaning "pointed" and cephalus meaning "head", a reference to the sharp snout of this species.

== Distribution and habitat ==
The coral hawkfish has a wide distribution in the Indian and Pacific Oceans. They occur from the Red Sea south along the coast of East Africa as far south as South Africa and east across the Indian Ocean into the Pacific Ocean to the Marquesas Islands south to Australia and north to Japan. It is also found in the eastern tropical Pacific, from the Gulf of California south to Colombia and the Galapagos.

They live in areas of dense coral growth and in the clear waters of lagoon, channel or outer reefs where they prefer to be underneath the surge zone, occurring at depths down to at least 40 m (130 ft).

== Description ==
In Mexico

The coral hawkfish has an oval, moderately compressed body with a pointed snout which has a straight profile. There is a fringe of cirri on the posterior edge of the anterior nostril. The mouth is moderately large and has a row of small canine-like teeth on the outer jaw with a band of simple teeth on the inner jaws. They have teeth on the middle and sides of the roof of mouth. There are large serrations on the preoperculum and the gill cover has 2 flattened spines. The dorsal fin has 10 spines and 12-13 soft rays, while the anal fin contains 3 spines and 6 soft rays. The dorsal fin is continuous with a notch separating the spiny and soft rayed parts of the fin, while the membranes between the spines are deeply incised and each spine has a tuft of cirri at its tip. The caudal fin is truncate. The lower 5-7 pectoral fin rays are robust, notably longer than other pectoral fin rays and separated by deep incisions in their membrane. The uppermost 1-2 and the lowest 6-7 pectoral fin rays are not branched. The pelvic fin has a single spines and 5 soft rays and starts origin behind the base of the pectoral fin. The maximum recorded total length of this species is 10 cm (3.9 in).

This is a variably coloured species, the background colour varying from whitish to pink marked with reddish-brown to greyish or bright reddish-orange blotches, smallest along the lateral line. The spiny part of the dorsal fin has large spots while the soft rayed part of the dorsal fin is spotted, as is the caudal fin. The pectoral fins are pinkish red in colour while the pelvic fins are transparent.

== Biology ==
In Panama

The coral hawkfish is normally observed perching on top of soft corals and sponges, they will also rest beneath hard and soft corals, ambushing crustaceans and small fishes that pass their station. Like the other hawkfishes, the adult coral hawkfish does not have a swimbladder and they hop from "perch" to "perch" like the hawks they are named after.

=== Reproduction ===
The males are territorial and guard harems of females. This species is a protogynous hermaphrodite. the juveniles are females and some will change sex to become into males as they mature. They are pelagic spawners and the spawning pair ascend into the water column.

== Aquarium trade ==
The coral hawkfish is occasionally found in the aquarium trade.

== Gallery ==
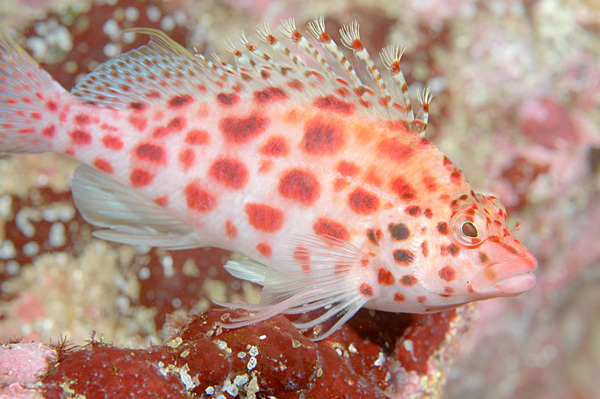
In the Galapagos

In Indonesia

In Panama

In Panama

In Panama

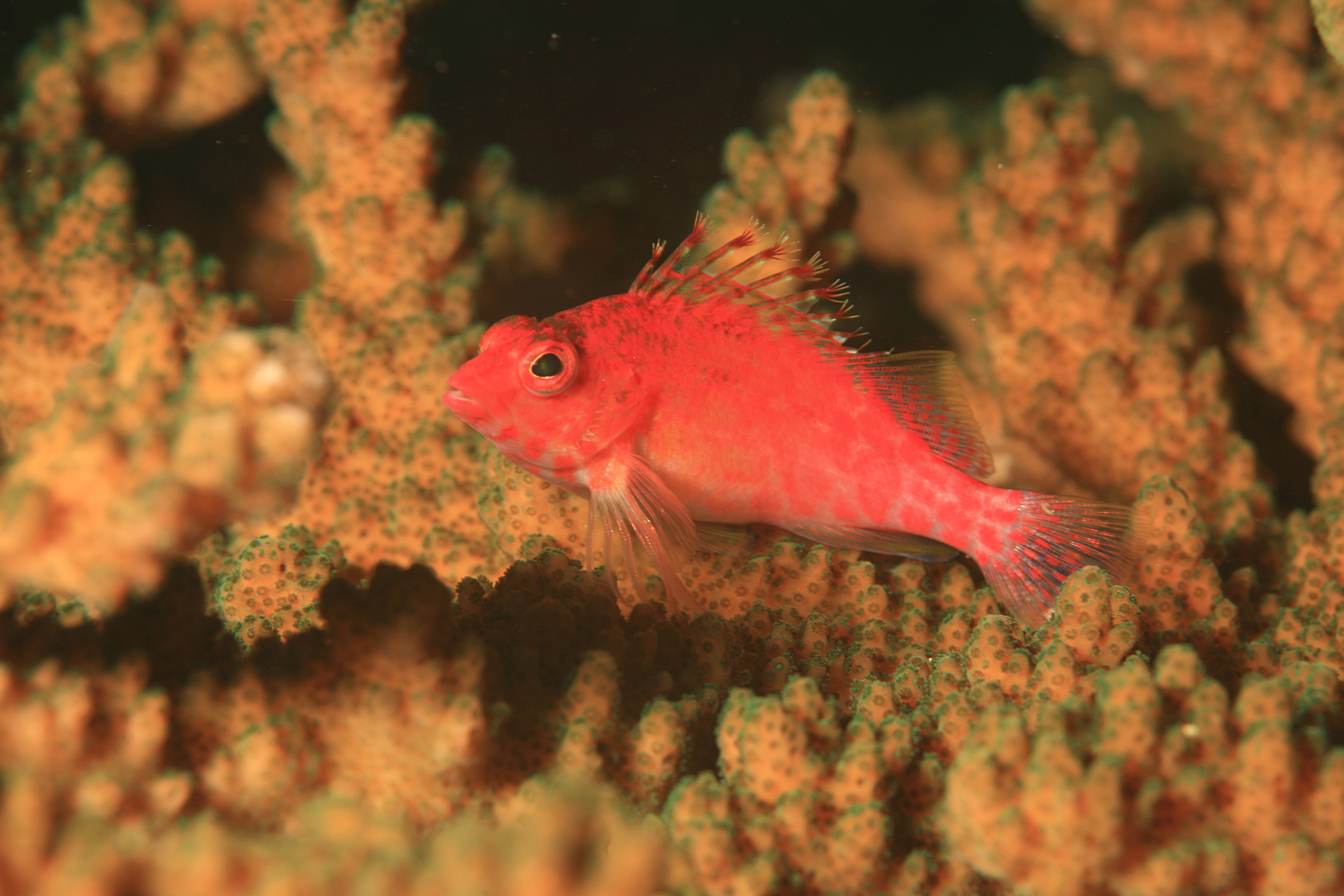
In Panama

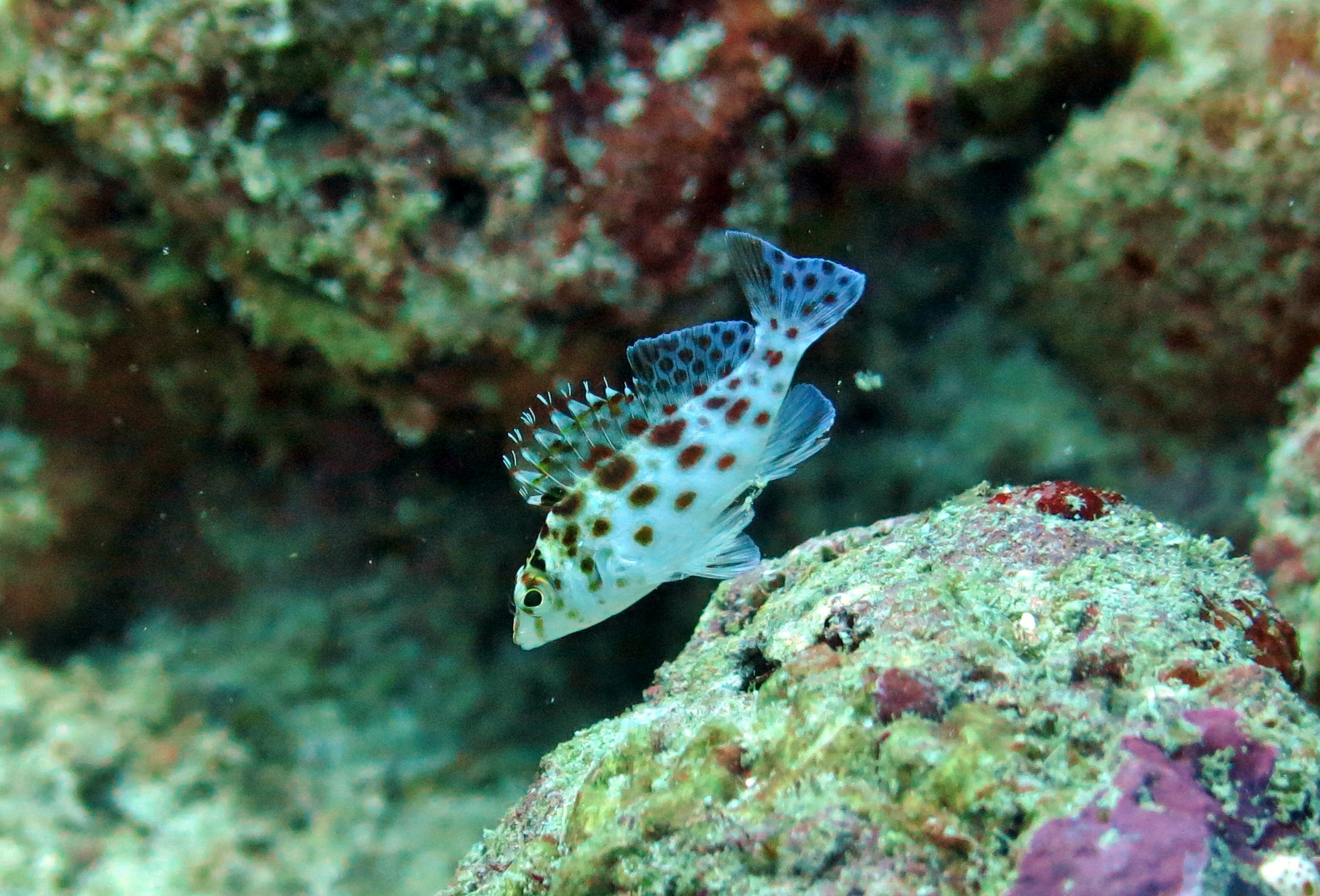
In the Maldives
