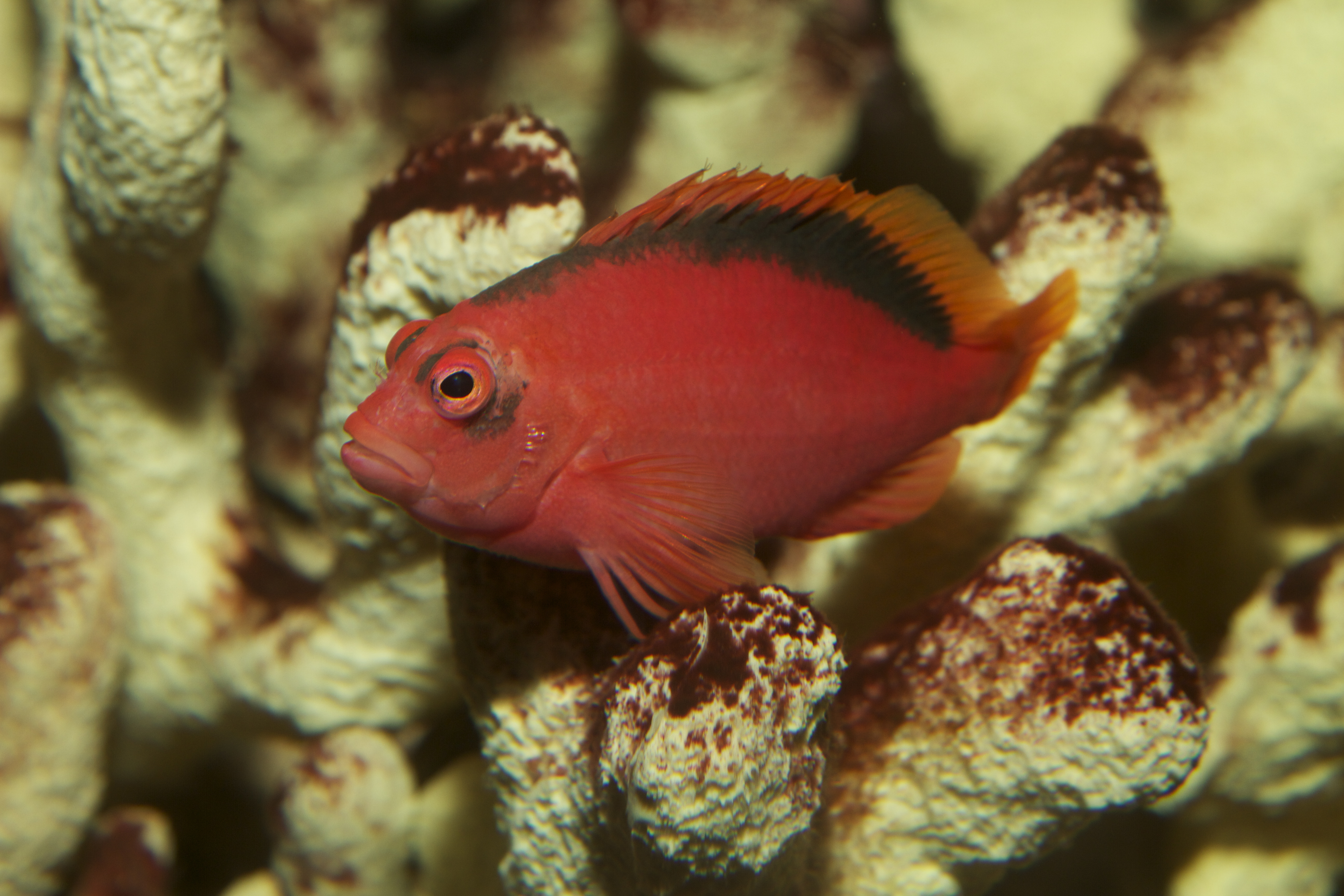

Conservation status
- Least Concern (IUCN 3.1)

Scientific classification
- Kingdom: Animalia
- Phylum: Chordata
- Class: Actinopterygii
- Division: Teleostei
- Order: Centrarchiformes
- Family: Cirrhitidae
- Genus: Neocirrhites; Castelnau, 1873
- Species: N. armatus

Binomial name
- Neocirrhites armatus Castelnau, 1873

= Flame hawkfish =

Species of fish

The flame hawkfish (Neocirrhites armatus) is a species of marine ray-finned fish, a hawkfish belonging to the family Cirrhitidae. It is native to tropical reefs of the Pacific Ocean at depths of from 1 to 10 metres (3.3 to 32.8 ft). This species is also found in the aquarium trade. It is the only known member of its genus.

== Taxonomy ==
The flame hawkfish was first formally described in 1873 by the French naturalist Francis de Laporte de Castelnau with the type locality given as Noble Island in the Torres Strait off Queensland. Laporte placed the new species he was describing in its own monotypic genus. The genus name is a compound of neo meaning "new" and Cirrhites, an alternative spelling of the type genus of the family Cirrhitidae, Cirrhitus. The specific name armatus means "armed" a reference to the spines on the preoperculum.

== Description ==
The flame hawkfish has a very deep, highly compressed body, its standard length being two to two and a half times its depth with a moderately long snout. The mouth has an outer row of canine teeth and an inner row of much smaller villiform teeth, the canines are notably larger at the front of the upper jaw and side of the lower jaw but there are no teeth on the palatine. There is a tuft of cirri and a flap on the posterior edge of the anterior nostril. The preoperculum has large serrations on at least its upper three quarters. The dorsal fin contains 10 spines and 13 soft rays while the anal fin has 3 spines and 6-7 soft rays. The dorsal fin spines are short, at the tip of each spine there is a tassel of cirri and the membranes between the spines are only weakly incised. The caudal fin is weakly rounded. The six lowest pectoral fin rays are unbranched and robust and the longest rays do not reach past the tips of the pelvic fins. This fish reaches a maximum total length of 9 centimetres (3.5 in). This species is bright red with areas of black around eyes and beneath the dorsal fin.

== Distribution and habitat ==
The flame hawkfish is found in the western Pacific where its range extends as far north as the Ryukyu and Ogasawara Islands of Japan across the Pacific as far as the Pitcairn Islands and south to the Great Barrier Reef off Queensland. This species may be found as deep as 25 m (82 ft), but is more commonly encountered between 10 and 15 m (33 and 49 ft). It is a common species on reef fronts with exposure to tidal surge and on underwater terraces.

== Biology ==
The flame hawkfish is typically observed using the branches of live corals to hide among. The preferred species are Stylophora mordax, Pocillopora elegans, P. eydouxi, or P. verrucosa and it flees deep into the coral if approached. Their diet comprises small crustaceans. It is an oviparous pelagic spawner which breeds in monogamous pairs. The adults do not have a swim bladder and use their robust pelvic fins as supports when perching on corals.

== Utilisation ==
The flame hawkfish is collected for the aquarium trade and it can be quite commonly available and is one of the more popular species of hawkfish for the hobby aquarium, however, it is reportedly expensive and difficult to properly maintain.
