= Redbarred hawkfish =

- In Hawaii

Conservation status
- Least Concern (IUCN 3.1)

Scientific classification
- Kingdom: Animalia
- Phylum: Chordata
- Class: Actinopterygii
- Division: Teleostei
- Order: Centrarchiformes
- Family: Cirrhitidae
- Genus: Cirrhitops
- Species: C. fasciatus

Binomial name
- Cirrhitops fasciatus (Bennett, 1828)

Synonyms
- Cirrhites fasciatus Bennett, 1828; Cirrhites cinctus Günther, 1860; Paracirrhites cinctus (Günther, 1860)

Species of fish

The redbarred hawkfish ( Cirrhitops fasciatus) is a species of marine ray-finned fish, a hawkfish belonging to the family Cirrhitidae. It is endemic to the Hawaiian Archipelago in the Pacific Ocean.

== Taxonomy ==
In Hawaii

The redbarred hawkfish was first formally described in 1828 as Cirrhites fasciatus by the English naturalist Edward Turner Bennett with the type locality given as the Hawaiian Islands. In 1829 Georges Cuvier described a species with the same name with the type locality given as Puducherry in India which Albert Günther mistakenly thought predated Turner's description. Günther devised the new name Cirrhites cinctus to replace Turner's original name but Cuvier published his name a year after Bennett published, meaning Cuvier's name was invalid and Günther's replacement name unnecessary. Cirrhites was a common misspelling of Cirrfitus. In 1951 the South African ichthyologist J. L. B. Smith described the new genus Cirrhitops with Cirrhites fasciatus as the type species. When he described the genus Smith stated that it was monotypic. The species was known from the southwestern Indian Ocean and its type locality of Hawaii and no records came from between these places, Cuvier's locality of India for his name being an error. In 2008, in a paper co-authored by John Ernest Randall and Jennifer K. Schultz, a new species Cirrhitops mascarenensis was described from the south western Indian Ocean based on genetic and morphological analyses. This then resolved the status of the redbarred hawkfish as a species endemic to the Hawaiian archipelago.

The specific name fasciatus means "banded", referring the four thick bands on the body.

== Distribution and habitat ==
The redbarred hawkfish is endemic to the Hawaiian Islands; records from Madagascar and the Mascerene Islands refer to Cirrhitops mascarenensis and the record from Japan is a misidentification. This species is found at depths between 1 and 52 m (3 ft 3 in and 170 ft 7 in) on a range of reef habitats and habitats associated with reefs.

== Description ==
In Hawaii

In Hawaii

The redbarred hawkfish has the higher 2 and lower 6 pectoral fin rays with no branching. There are 10 spines Nd 14, occasionally 15, soft rays in the dorsal fin the spines all have a tassel of cirri at their tip and moderate incisions on the membranes between them, except that there is a deep incision between the fifth and sixth spines. The roof of the mouth has a small number of small teeth. The upper three fifths of the margin of the preoperculum has large serrations, the rest of the margin of it is smooth. The dorsal profile of the snout is convex. The caudal fin is truncate and the pelvic fin extends past the anus. This species attains a maximum total length of 12.7 cm (5.0 in).

The background colour of the head and body is whitish with reddish or brown vertical bands on the flanks and back and speckling on the face.

== Biology ==
The redbarred hawkfish is benthic. Like other hawkfishes it perches on corals and sponges to watch for prey which may be small fishes, and crustaceans, as well as a small amount of sipunculids and zooplankton such as larval shrimps, copepods, amphipods and larval gastropods.

== Aquarium trade ==
The redbarred hawkfish is occasionally found in the aquarium trade.
