= Spotted hawkfish =

- In Indonesia

Conservation status
- Least Concern (IUCN 3.1)

Scientific classification
- Kingdom: Animalia
- Phylum: Chordata
- Class: Actinopterygii
- Division: Teleostei
- Order: Centrarchiformes
- Family: Cirrhitidae
- Genus: Cirrhitichthys
- Species: C. aprinus

Binomial name
- Cirrhitichthys aprinus (G. Cuvier, 1829)

Synonyms
- Cirrhites aprinus G. Cuvier, 1829; Cirrhites graphidopterus Bleeker, 1853; Cirrhitichthys analis Fowler, 1938

Species of fish

The spotted hawkfish (Cirrhitichthys aprinus), the blotched hawkfish, redbarred hawkfish, boar hawkfish or threadfin hawkfish, is a species of marine ray-finned fish, a hawkfish belonging to the family Cirrhitidae. It is widespread throughout the tropical waters of the Indo-West Pacific region. A common species, it is found in rocky and coral areas of subtidal coastal reefs.

== Taxonomy ==
The spotted hawkfish was first formally described as Cirrhites aprinus in 1829 by the French zoologist Georges Cuvier with the type locality given as Timor. When the genus Cirrhitichthys was described by Pieter Bleeker in 1857 he used a species he had described in 1853, Cirrhites graphidopterus as its type species, but this was later shown to be a synonym of Cuvier's C. aprinus.

The specific name aprinus means "boar-like", a reference to the large canine teeth in the sides of the lower jaws.

== Distribution and habitat ==
The spotted hawkfish is found from Sumatra eastwards to the Solomon Islands, north to the Philippines and the Ogasawara and Ryukyu Islands of southern Japan and south to the eastern and western coasts of Australia. There have been isolated records from the western Indian Ocean, these include reports from Aliwal Shoal off South Africa and the Maldives.

In Australia they occur from Houtman Abrolhos Islands off Western Australia to the Timor Sea east of the Margaret Harries Bank, north of Melville Island in the Northern Territory. They then occur off the eastern coast from the northern Great Barrier Reef in Queensland south to Jervis Bay and maybe as far south to Merimbula, New South Wales. It is also found at the Cocos (Keeling) Islands, the Ashmore Reef in the Timor Sea, and Lord Howe Island in the Tasman Sea.

This is a common species inhabiting rocky and coral areas of coastal reefs below the low tide mark and which will also move into shallow harbours and estuaries. It is found at depths between 5 and 40 m (16 and 131 ft).

== Description ==
In Bali, Indonesia

The spotted hawkfish has a body in which the standard length is around two and a half times its depth. They have a strongly serrated preoperculum and a body which is covered in cycloid scales. The dorsal fin has 10 spines and 12 soft rays while the anal fin has 3 spines and 6 soft rays. The dorsal spines are tipped with short white filaments. The lower 7 pectoral fin rays are robust and unbranched. The pelvic fins extend past the anus and the caudal fin is weakly emarginate. This species attains a maximum total length of 12.5 cm (4.9 in).

In West Papua, Indonesia

The overall background colour of this species is whitish with wide dark reddish-brown vertical bars on the flanks. These are broken by light bars containing rhombus-shaped dark patches where they cross the lateral line. There is a pale-margined dark circular spot on the upper edge of the operculum and each eye has 3-4 dark bars radiating outwards from it. The caudal fin is translucent and unmarked.

== Biology ==
The spotted hawkfish is frequently encountered either as solitary fish or in small groups. They perch on benthic invertebrates such as sponges and corals, using their thickened lower pectoral fin rays. They feed on small fishes and crustaceans. They are thought to be protogynous hermaphrodites and to be organised into harems of a single male and a small number of females. When spawning a pair spirals upwards in the water column for less than 1 m (3 ft 3 in), the eggs are pelagic.

== Utilisation ==
The spotted hawkfish is rare in the aquarium trade.

== Gallery ==
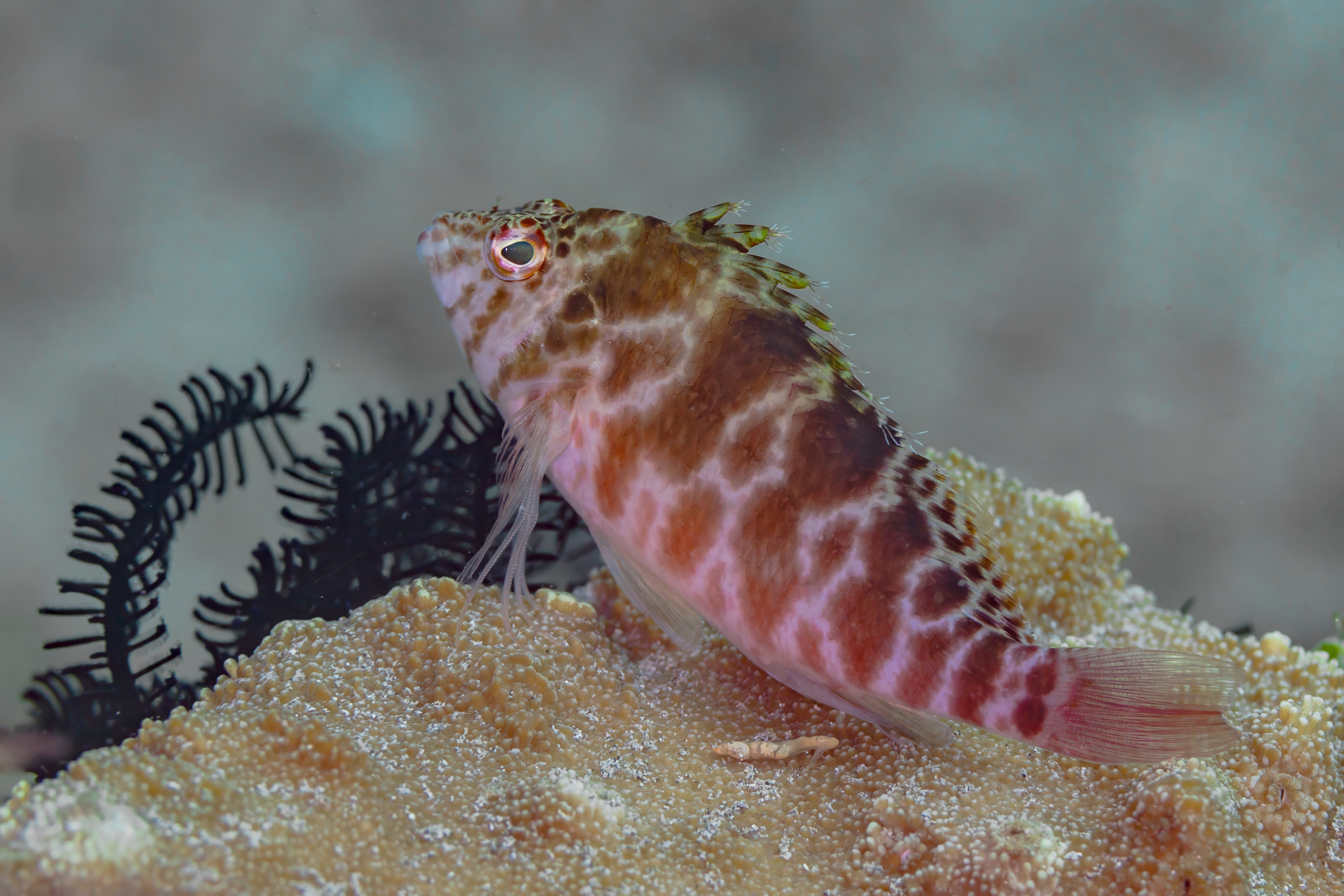
In the Philippines

In Japan

In Japan
