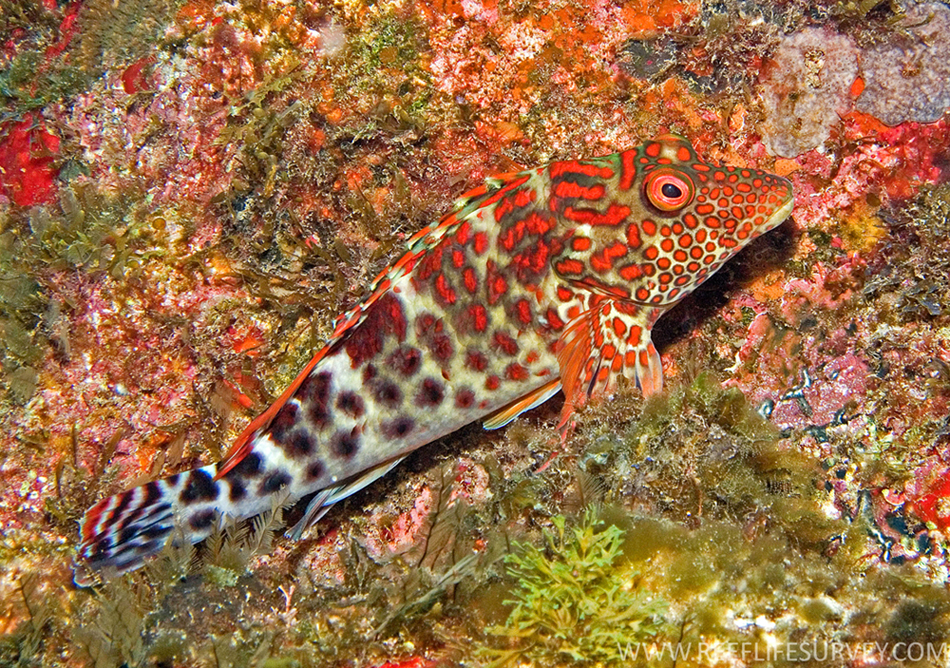
- Lord Howe Island

Conservation status
- Least Concern (IUCN 3.1)

Scientific classification
- Kingdom: Animalia
- Phylum: Chordata
- Class: Actinopterygii
- Order: Centrarchiformes
- Family: Cirrhitidae
- Genus: Notocirrhitus; J. E. Randall, 2001
- Species: N. splendens

Binomial name
- Notocirrhitus splendens (J. D. Ogilby, 1889)

Synonyms
- Cirrhitichthys splendens J. D. Ogilby, 1889; Cirrhitus splendens (J. D. Ogilby, 1889)

= Splendid hawkfish =

Species of fish

The splendid hawkfish (Notocirrhitus splendens), also known as mottled hawkfish, is a species of marine ray-finned fish, a hawkfish belonging to the family Cirrhitidae. It is found on tropical reefs of the Pacific Ocean.

== Taxonomy ==
The splendid hawkfish was first formally described in 1889 as Cirrhitichthys splendens by the Irish born Australian ichthyologist and herpetologist James Douglas Ogilby with the type locality given as Lord Howe Island. In 2001 John Ernest Randall placed it in a new monotypic genus, Notocirrhitus. The genus name is a compound of noto meaning "south" a reference to the more southerly range of this species in comparison to other hawkfishes and Cirrhitus the type genus of the family Cirrhitidae. The specific name splendens means "splendid" or "superb", referring to the bright colouration of this fish.

== Description ==
The splendid hawkfish has a moderately deep body and a slightly elongate snout. There are 25 or more small serrations on the upper margin of the preoperculum and the gill membrane across the throat does not have scales. The dorsal fin has 10 spines and 12 soft rays while the anal fin has 3 spines and 6 soft rays. The first dorsal fin ray is elongated. The uppermost and lower seven pectoral fin rays are elongated and robust. It is a relatively large hawkfish with a maximum published total length of 20 cm (7.9 in). The body is grey on the head shading to white towards the tail. The snout and face are marked with reddish spots which have darkish margins, there are stripes on the nape and dark blotches on the flanks. There are spots on the tail and the base of the pectoral fin has orange-red spots.

== Distribution and habitat ==
The splendid hawkfish is found in the southwestern Pacific Ocean where it has been only been recorded from the Australian waters off Point Danger near Coolangatta in Queensland, North Solitary Island and Nelson Bay in northern New South Wales, Elizabeth Reef, Lord Howe Island and Norfolk Island and the Kermadec Islands of New Zealand. It is found at depths of 7 to 12 m (23 to 39 ft) around seaward reefs in the vicinity of coral heads where there is a hard substrate.
