= Cirrhitus pinnulatus =

- In Hawaii

Conservation status
- Least Concern (IUCN 3.1)

Scientific classification
- Kingdom: Animalia
- Phylum: Chordata
- Class: Actinopterygii
- Division: Teleostei
- Order: Centrarchiformes
- Family: Cirrhitidae
- Genus: Cirrhitus
- Species: C. pinnulatus

Binomial name
- Cirrhitus pinnulatus (Forster, 1801)

Synonyms
- List: Labrus pinnulatus Forster, 1801; Labrus marmoratus Lacépède, 1801; Cirrhitus maculatus Lacepède, 1803; Cirrhites maculosus Bennett, 1828; Cirrhitus alternatus Gill, 1862; Cirrhitus spilotoceps Schultz, 1950

Species of fish

Cirrhitus pinnulatus, the stocky hawkfish, whitespotted hawkfish or marbled hawkfish, is a species of marine ray-finned fish, a hawkfish belonging to the family Cirrhitidae. It is found in the Indo-West Pacific region.

== Taxonomy ==
Cirrhitus pinnulatus was first formally described in 1801 as Labrus pinnulatus by the German naturalist and explorer Johann Reinhold Forster from Tahiti. Forster's manuscript description was the basis of the description published in 1801 by Johann Gottlob Schneider in his and Marcus Elieser Bloch's Systema Ichthyologiae, although Catalog of Fishes attributes the name to Forster. When the French naturalist Bernard Germain de Lacépède created the genus Cirrhitus he placed a single species within it, his own Cirrhitus maculatus which was later shown to be a synonym of Forster's Labrus pinnulatus, under the name C. maculatus this species is the type species of its genus. The specific name pinnulatus means "pinnulated", perhaps a reference to the fringe of cirri on the rear margin of the front nostril.

Three subspecies of this species are sometimes recognised:

- Cirrhitus pinunulatus pinnulatus Forster, 1801
- Cirrhitus pinnulatus maculatus Lacépède, 1803
- Cirrhitus pinnulatus spilotoceps Schultz, 1950

Cirrhitus spilotoceps from the Red Sea is variably treated as either a distinct species or as a synonym of C. pinnulatus

In 1950 Leonard Peter Schultz recognised three species from the widespread species C. pinnulatus, C. spilotoceps from the Red Sea, C. pinnulatus from the wider Indo-Pacific region except for Hawaii and C. maculosus from Hawaii and the Johnston Atoll. John Ernest Randall in his 1963 review of the family Cirrhitidae did not recognise these species but treated them as subspecies. Catalog of Fishes recognises C. spilotoceps as a valid species and treats C. maculosus as a subspecies of C. pinnulatus, while FishBase treats these names as synonyms of C. pinnulatus. It may be that records of C. pinnulatus sensu lato from the east African coast and possibly elsewhere in the Indian Ocean, refer to C. spilotoceps.

== Distribution and habitat ==
Cirrhitus pinnulatus has a wide Indo-West Pacific distribution being found from the Red Sea and the east African coast south as far as Port Alfred in South Africa east across the Indian Ocean and into the Pacific where it reaches as far east as Hawaii, south to New Caledonia and Australia and north to the Ryukyu Islands of southern Japan.

In Australia it is found at Ningaloo Reef and Scott Reef in Western Australia, Cartier Reef in the Timor Sea and from Lizard Island to Escape Reef on the Great Barrier Reef in Queensland, it also occurs at Christmas Island and the Cocos (Keeling) Islands.

It occurs at depths between 1 and 23 m (3 ft 3 in and 75 ft 6 in) but is typically found at depths of less than 15 m (49 ft). This species is found in exposed areas such as the surge zone on the seaward sides of reefs and along rocky coastlines.

== Description ==
In Hawaii
In Hawaii

Cirrhitus pinnulatus has a body which has a standard length of roughly three times its depth. The head has a short, blunt snout and a large mouth which extends back as far as the rear edge of the eye which has a low bony ridge above it. The mouth has two types of teeth, an outer row of canines and an inner row of villiform teeth. There are also teeth on the centre and sides of the roof of the mouth. They have a fringe of cirri on the posterior margin of the anterior nostril. The upper margin of the preopercle has fine serrations. The continuous dorsal fin has 10 spines and 11 soft rays, there is a deep incision between spiny and soft rayed parts of the fin and a tassel of cirri near tip of each spine. The anal fin has 3 spines and 6 soft rays> The caudal fin gently rounded and the pectoral fins do not extend as far as the tips of pelvic fins, The pectoral fin rays number 14 with the lower 7 unbranched and robust. This species attains a maximum total length of 30 cm (12 in), although 23 cm (9.1 in) is more typical.

The overall colour of this hawkfish is brown with white blotches and irregular reddish-brown spots on the body, The head is marked with sinuous reddish-orange lines and spots. There is a dark saddle-like blotch on the dorsal part of the caudal peduncle.

== Biology ==
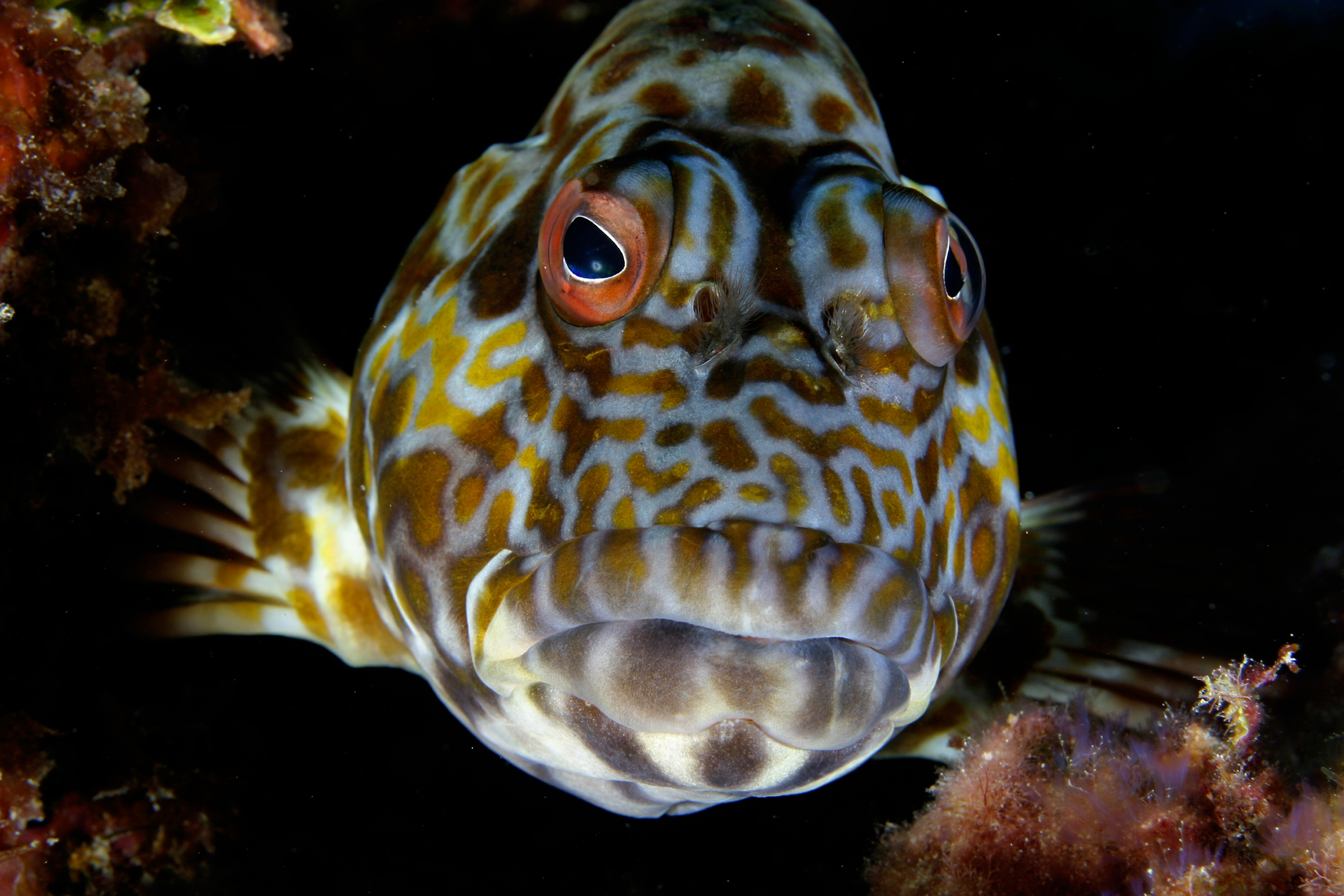
Closeup, in Hawaii

Cirrhitus pinnulatus is a nocturnal species. It is a predator which mainly feeds on crabs. It will also feed on other crustaceans, small fishes, sea urchins or brittle stars. They are pelagic spawners, the pair ascend into the water column to release their gametes. They are likely to be protogynous hermaphrodites but further study is needed to confirm this.

== Fisheries ==
Cirrhatus pinnulatus is taken by subsistence fisheries and is normally caught from shore using hook and line, the catch is sold fresh.

== Gallery ==
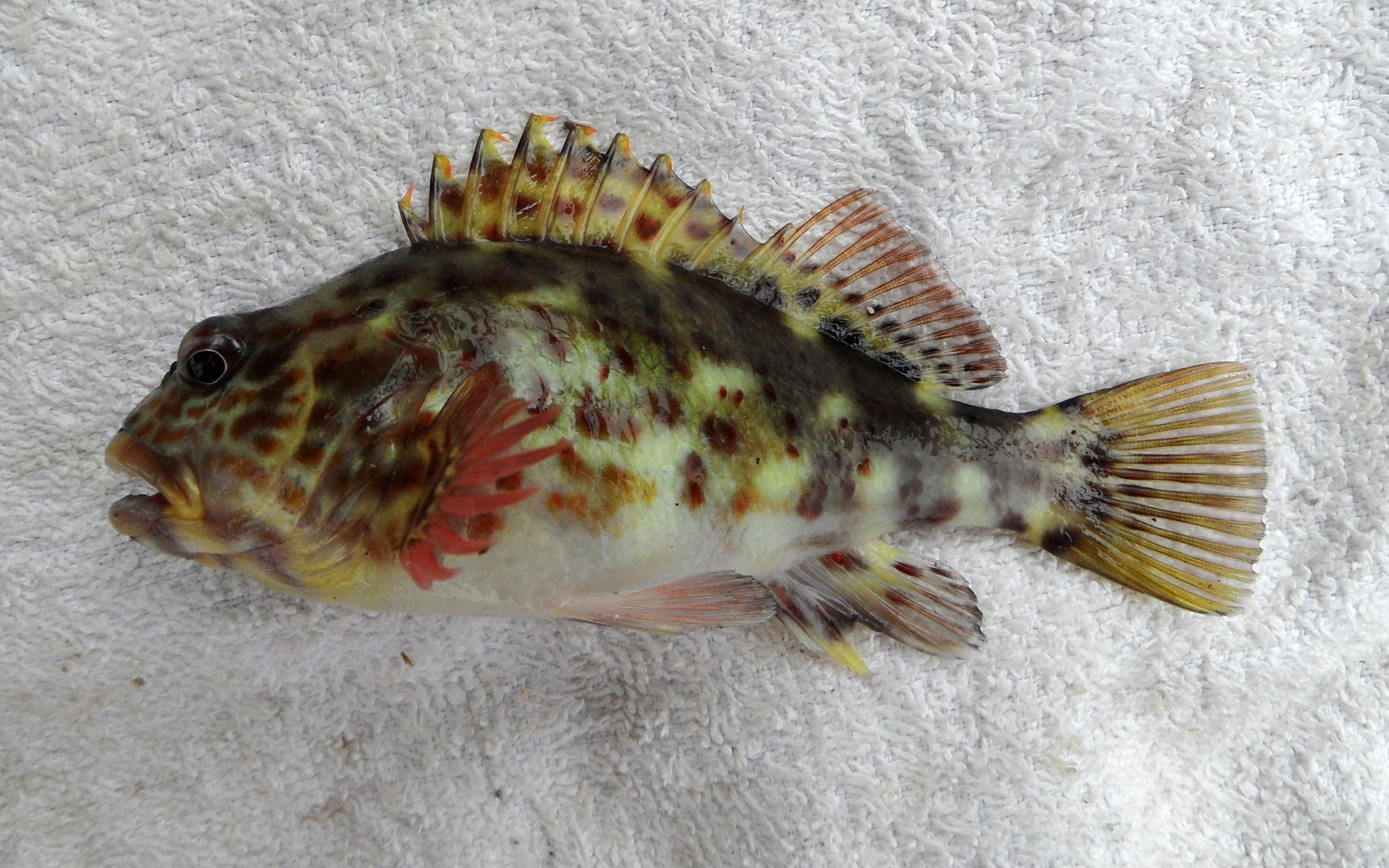
In Sri Lanka

In Taiwan

In Taiwan

In Hawaii

In Hawaii
