= Dwarf hawkfish =

- In Indonesia

Conservation status
- Least Concern (IUCN 3.1)

Scientific classification
- Kingdom: Animalia
- Phylum: Chordata
- Class: Actinopterygii
- Division: Teleostei
- Order: Centrarchiformes
- Family: Cirrhitidae
- Genus: Cirrhitichthys
- Species: C. falco

Binomial name
- Cirrhitichthys falco J. E. Randall, 1963

Synonyms
- Cirrhitichthys serratus J. E. Randall, 1963

Species of fish

The dwarf hawkfish, (Cirrhitichthys falco), is a small species of hawkfish found on tropical reefs in the Indo-Pacific region from the Maldives to the Caroline Islands and Samoa. It can sometimes be found in the aquarium trade.

== Taxonomy ==
The dwarf hawkfish was first formally described in 1963 by the American ichthyologist John Ernest Randall with the type locality given as Davao Gulf, Mindanao in the Philippines.

The specific name falco is Latin for "falcon", Randall did not explain the name but it may be a play on the common name hawkfish.

== Distribution and habitat ==
The dwarf hawkfish is native to the tropical Indo-Pacific. Its range extends from the eastern coast of Africa and the Maldives to Samoa, the Ryukyu Islands, northern Australia, the Great Barrier Reef and New Caledonia. It is a common member of the reef community on outer reef slopes and flats and is found at depths down to about 45 m (148 ft).

== Description ==
In the Philippines

The dwarf hawkfish can reach 7 cm (2.8 in) in total length. The dorsal fin has ten spines with numerous tassels on the tips of the spines. The anal fin has three spines and six soft rays. The pectoral fins are thick and elongated and spread out when the fish is resting on the substrate. This fish is pinkish-red and white in color with vertical banding or mottling.

== Behavior ==
The dwarf hawkfish typically rests at the bottom of massive corals. It usually occurs singly but may be in pairs and feeds on fish larvae, small crustaceans and other invertebrates on the seabed.

=== Reproduction ===
Like many fish, this species can change sex. A dominant male keeps a harem of several females. If a harem becomes too large, one of the females may become a male and take on part of the harem as a dominant male. What makes this species unusual is that the new male may revert to the female sex if challenged by a more powerful male. A male can become a female and successfully breed, laying fertile eggs.

== Gallery ==
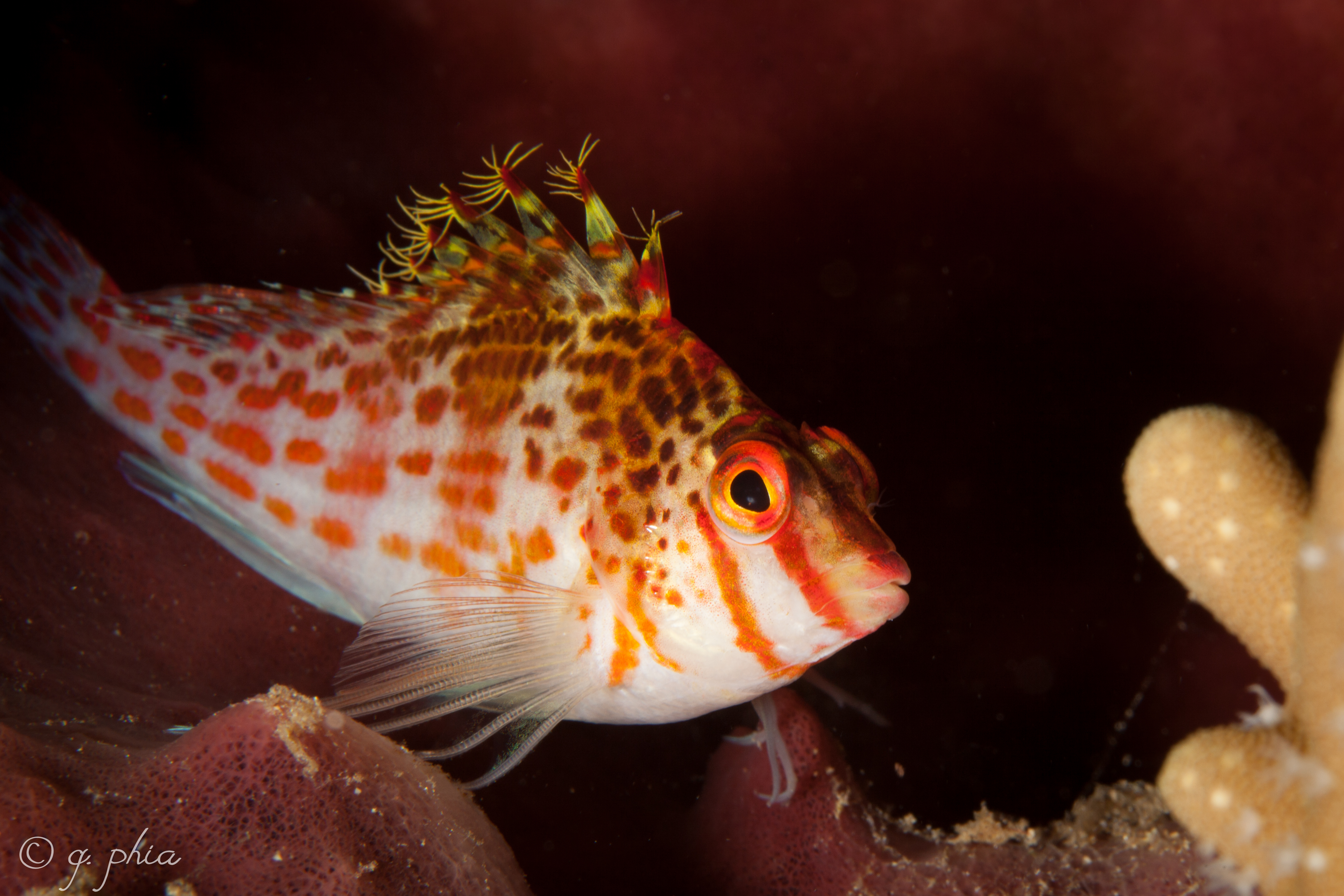
Close up, at Wakatobi National Park, Indonesia

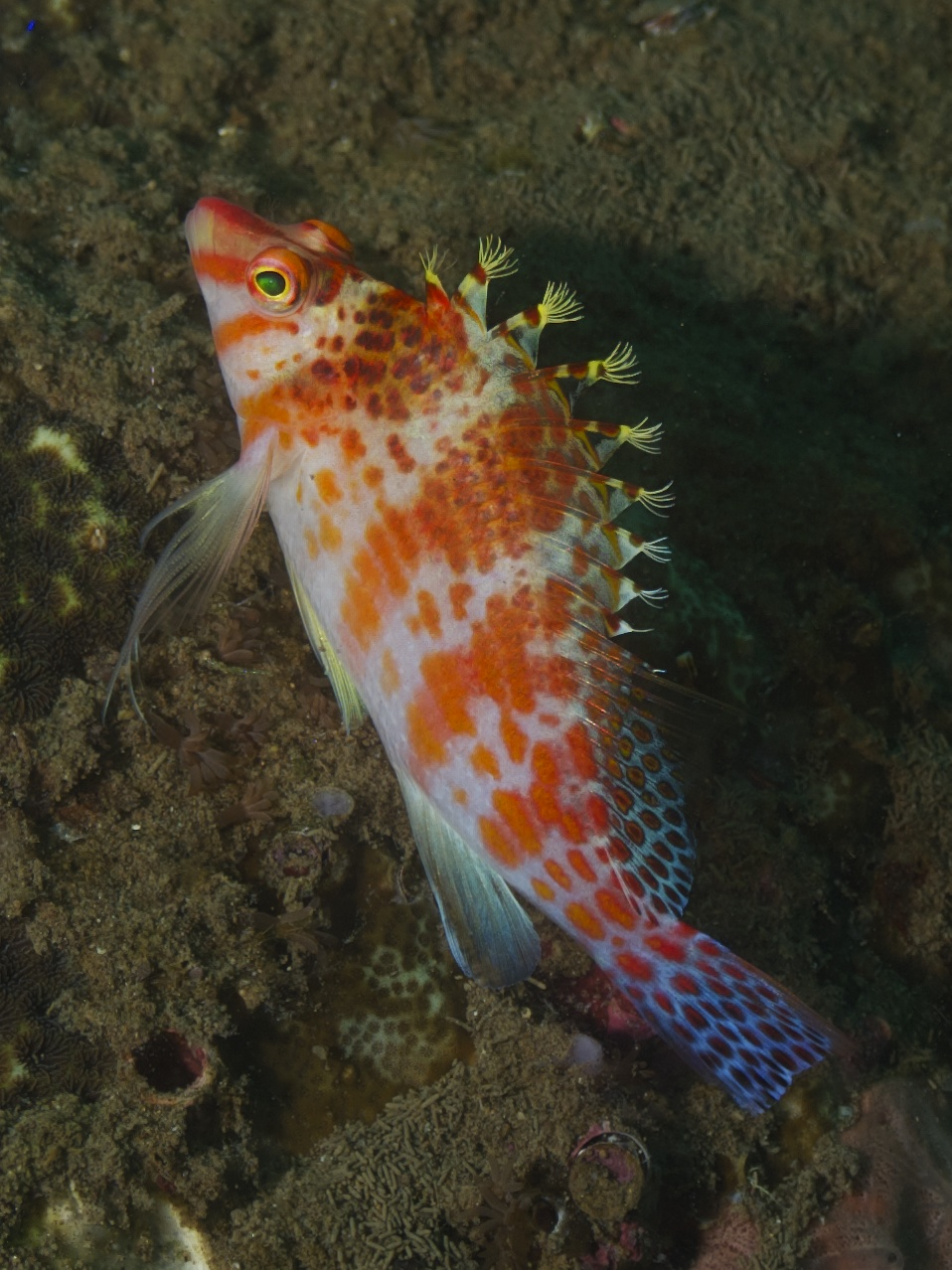
At Dauin, Philippines

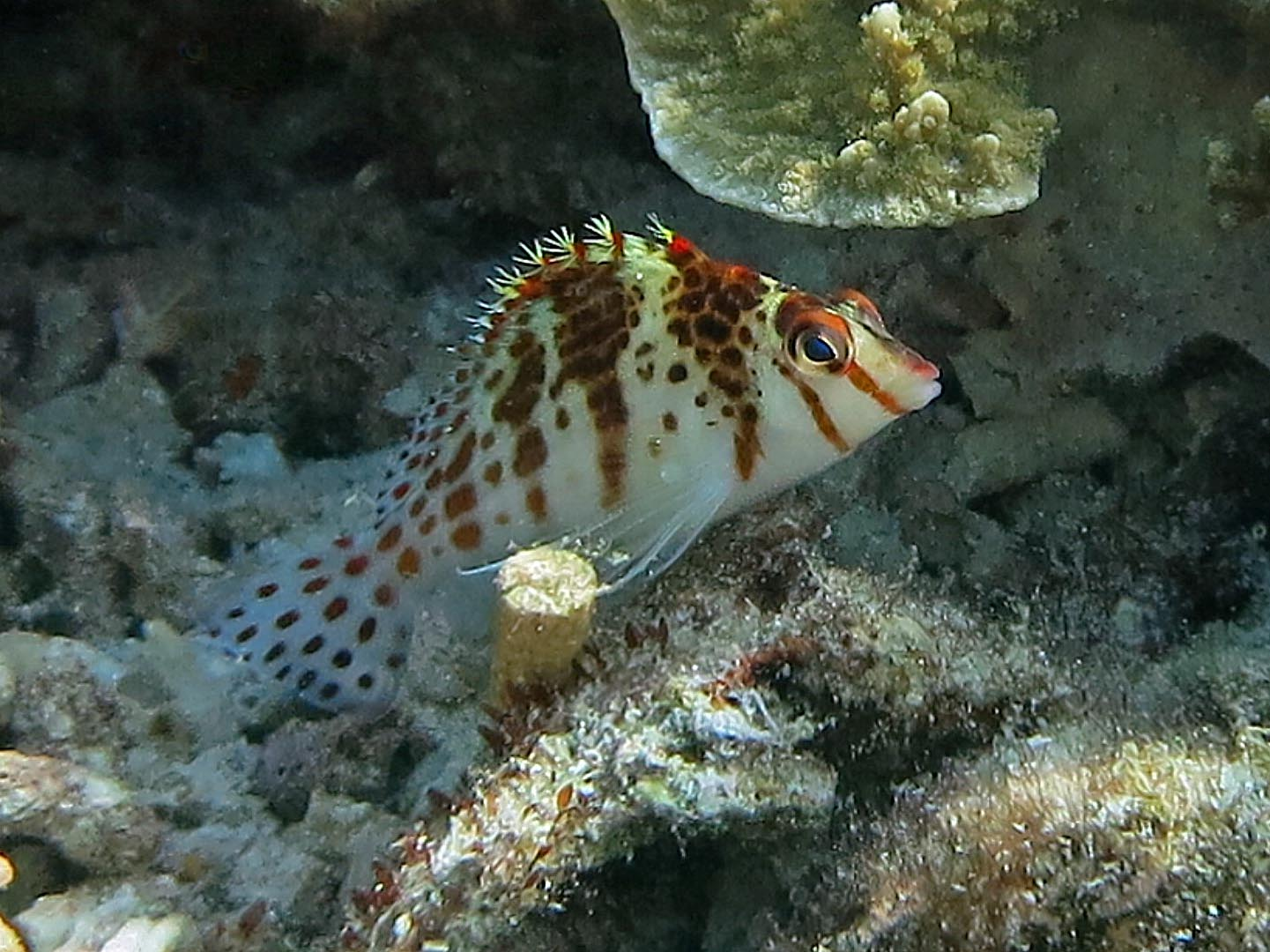
At Moalboal, Philippines

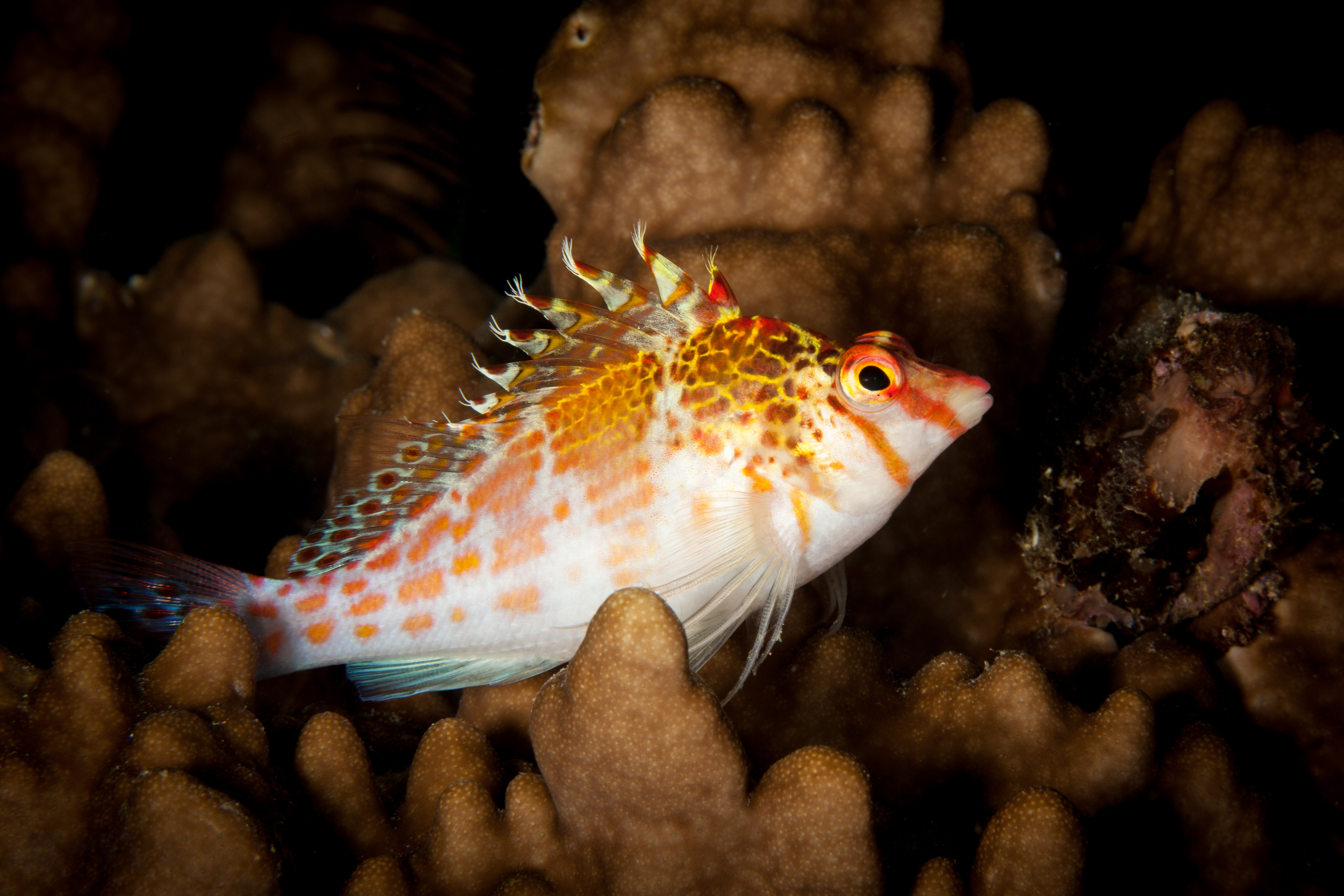
In Fiji
