= Cirrhitichthys =

- Spotted hawkfish (C. aprinus)

Scientific classification
- Kingdom: Animalia
- Phylum: Chordata
- Class: Actinopterygii
- Division: Teleostei
- Order: Centrarchiformes
- Family: Cirrhitidae
- Genus: Cirrhitichthys; Bleeker, 1857

Type species
- Cirrhites graphidopterus Bleeker, 1853

Synonyms
- Acanthocirrhitus Fowler, 1938; Cirrhitopsis Gill, 1862

Genus of fishes

Cirrhitichthys is a genus of marine ray-finned fish, hawkfishes, from the family Cirrhitidae. They are found on tropical reefs in the Indian and western Pacific oceans. Some species can be found in the aquarium trade.

== Taxonomy ==
Cirrhitichthys was first formally described in 1857 by the Dutch ichthyologist Pieter Bleeker. The type species designated by Bleeker was Cirrhites graphidopterus which had been described by him in 1853, although this taxon has subsequently been considered a synonym of Cirrhites aprinus which Georges Cuvier had described in 1829.

The name of this genus is a compound of Cirrhitus, referring to the similarity between the two genera, although there are differences in dentition, and ichthys meaning “fish”.

== Species ==
The currently recognized species in this genus are:

Species	Common name	Image
Cirrhitichthys aprinus (G. Cuvier, 1829)	spotted hawkfish	
Cirrhitichthys aureus (Temminck & Schlegel, 1842)	yellow hawkfish	
Cirrhitichthys bleekeri F. Day, 1874		
Cirrhitichthys calliurus Regan, 1905	spottedtail hawkfish	
Cirrhitichthys falco J. E. Randall, 1963	dwarf hawkfish	
Cirrhitichthys guichenoti (Sauvage, 1880)		
Cirrhitichthys oxycephalus (Bleeker, 1855)	coral hawkfish	
Cirrhitichthys randalli Kotthaus, 1976		

== Characteristics ==
Cirrhitichthys hawkfishes have an oval, moderately compressed body with a sharp, more or less straight-profiled snout. The anterior nostril has a tuft of cirri on its posterior margin. The mouth is moderately large with a row of small canine-like teeth on the jaws and a band of simple teeth within the outer band. There are patches of teeth on the middle and sides of the roof of the mouth. The margin of the preoperculum has quite large serrations and the gill cover has 2 flattened spines. The dorsal fin is continuous, with 10 spines and 11-12 soft rays, there is a slight incision between the spines and the soft rays. The membranes between the dorsal fin spines deeply notched and each spine has a sizeable tuft of cirri at its tip. The anal fin has 3 spines and 5-7 soft rays. The caudal fin is truncate. The lower 5-7 pectoral fin rays are robust with deep incisions in the membranes between them and they are notably longer than the other rays. The upper 1-2 and lower 6-7 pectoral fin rays are simple. The pelvic fin has a single spine and 5 soft rays and has its origin to the rear of the base of the pectoral fin. Their total length varies from 7 cm (2.8 in) in the dwarf hawkfish (C.s falco) and 14 cm (5.5 in) in the yellow hawkfish (C. aureus).

== Distribution and habitat ==
Cirrhitichthys hawkfishes are mainly found in the Indo-West Pacific with one species, the coral hawkfish (C. oxycephalus) extending into the eastern Pacific. These fishes are associated with coral and rocky habitats.

== Biology ==
Cirrhitichthys hawkfishes are predatory, using the "sit and wait" technique to ambush benthic prey which can be invertebrates or fish, perching on their thickened lower pectoral fin rays among sponges and corals. They are protogynous hermaphrodites, all start out as female and live in harems, if the male is lost the largest and more dominant female will change sex. They are pelagic spawners rising upwards into the water column in pairs to spawn.

== Utilisation ==
Cirrhitichthys hawkfishes are collected for the aquarium trade.
