= Cirrhitidae =

Hawkfish
- Stocky hawkfish (Cirrhitus pinnulatus)

Scientific classification
- Kingdom: Animalia
- Phylum: Chordata
- Class: Actinopterygii
- Division: Teleostei
- Clade: Eupercaria
- Order: Centrarchiformes
- Suborder: Cirrhitoidei
- Family: Cirrhitidae; W. S. Macleay, 1841

Genera
- see text

Family of fishes

Cirrhitidae, the hawkfishes, are a family of marine ray-finned fishes found in tropical seas and which are associated with coral reefs. They lack swim bladders, and use their robust lower pectoral fin rays to hold on to solid surfaces.

== Taxonomy ==
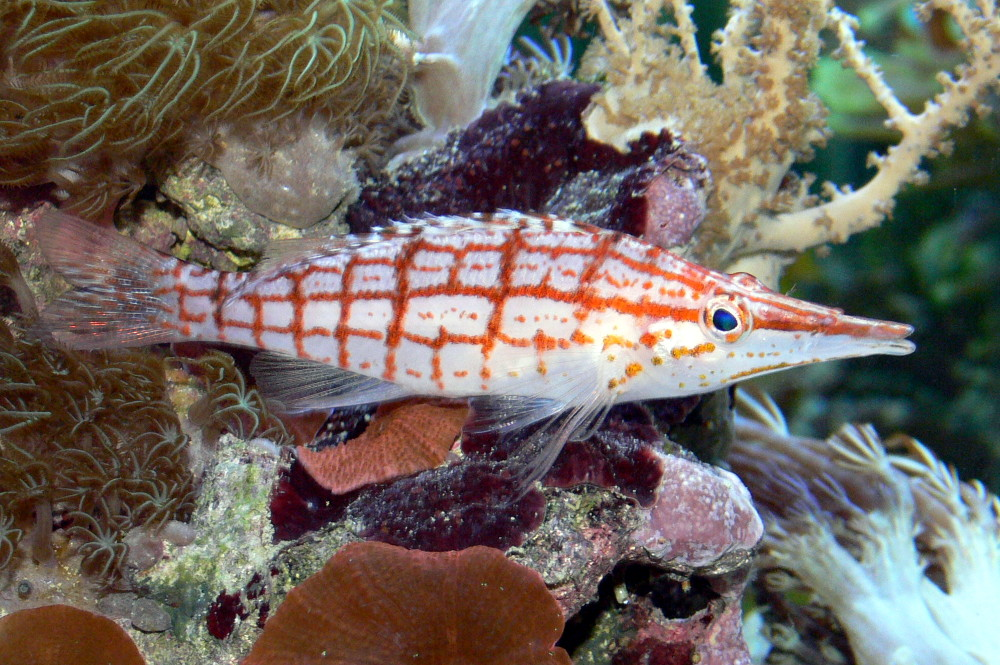
Longnose hawkfish (Oxycirrhites typus)

The Cirrhitidae were first recognised as a family by the Scots-born Australian naturalist William Sharp Macleay in 1841. It is one of the five constituent families in the superfamily Cirrhitoidea which is classified in the suborder Percoidei of the order Perciformes. Within Cirrhitoidea, the Cirrhitidae is probably the most basal family. They have been placed in the order Centrarchiformes by some authorities, as part of the superfamily Cirrhitoidea, however, the fifth edition of Fishes of the World does not recognise the Centrarchiformes.

=== Etymology ===
The name of the family is taken from that of the genus Cirrhitus which is derived from cirrhus meaning a "lock of hair" or "a barbel", thought to be a reference to lower, unbranched rays of the pectoral fins which Bernard Germain de Lacépède termed as "barbillons", which means "barbels" in his description of the type species of the genus C. maculatus, and which he thought to be "false" pectoral fins. Another possibility is that the name refers to cirri extending from the tips of the spines in the dorsal fin spines, although Lacépède did not mention this feature.

== Genera ==
The following 12 genera are classified within the Cirrhitidae, containing a total of 33 species:

- Amblycirrhitus Gill, 1862
- Cirrhitichthys Bleeker, 1857
- Cirrhitops J.L.B Smith, 1951
- Cirrhitus Lacépède, 1803
- Cristacirrhitus Randall, 2001
- Cyprinocirrhites Tanaka, 1917
- Isocirrhitus Randall, 1963
- Itycirrhitus Randall 2001
- Neocirrhites Castelnau, 1873
- Notocirrhitus Randall, 2001
- Oxycirrhites Bleeker, 1857
- Paracirrhites Bleeker, 1874

== Characteristics ==
Cirrhitidae hawkfishes are roughly oblong in shape with a body which has a depth which is 21% to 50% of its standard length. They have a fringe of cirri on the rear edge of the forward nostrils. There are two poorly developed spines, on the gill cover. The outer row of teeth on the jaws are canine-like, the longest normally being located at the front of the upper jaw and the middle of the lower jaw. Inside this row, there is a band of bristle-like teeth, wider in the front. The dorsal fin is continuous, having 10 spines and 11–17 soft rays; it has an incision separating the spiny and soft-rayed parts. The anal fin contains three spines and five to seven, typically six, soft rays. There are 14 pectoral fin rays with the lowest five to seven rays unbranched and normally thickened, with deep notches in the membranes separating these lower rays. There is a single spine in the pelvic fins as well as five soft rays. The scales are cycloid and they lack a swimbladder. The colour and pattern vary between species. The maximum length attained is around 55 cm (22 in), although around 30 cm (12 in) is more typical. Most species are quite small and colourfully patterned.

== Distribution and habitat ==
Cirrhitid hawkfishes are found in the tropical western and eastern Atlantic, Indian and Pacific, mainly in the Indo-West Pacific region. They are benthic fishes which are found on coral reefs or rocky substrates, mostly inhabiting shallow water.

== Biology ==
Cirrhitid hawkfishes use their robust lower pectoral-fin rays to wedge into position where they will be subjected to the forces of currents and waves. They are carnivorous fishes, their main prey being benthic crustaceans. One species, Cyprinocirrhitus polyactis, mainly feeds on zooplankton, although it is frequently encountered resting on the substrate. Hawkfish frequently sit and wait on the higher parts of their habitat, diving onto prey items seen underneath them, in a similar manner to some hawk species, hence the name hawkfish.

== Fisheries and utilisation ==
Cirrhitid hawkfishes are mostly too small to be of interest to fisheries. The three largest species are occasionally fished for as food fish. A few of the smaller more colourful species, particularly Neocirrhites armatus and Oxycirrhites typus, are collected for the aquarium trade.

== Gallery ==
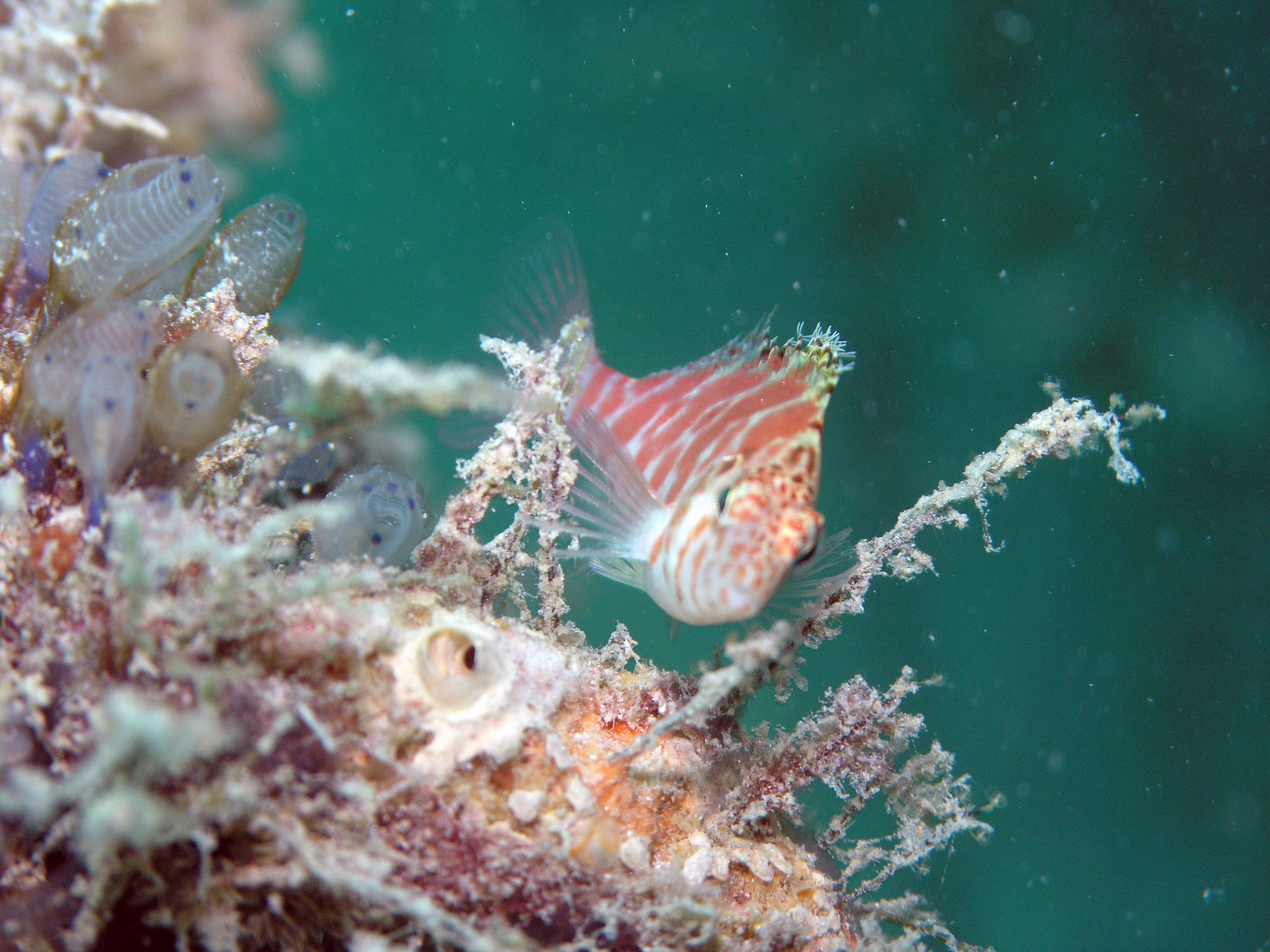
Dwarf hawkfish (Cirrhitichthys falco), Sipadan, Malaysia

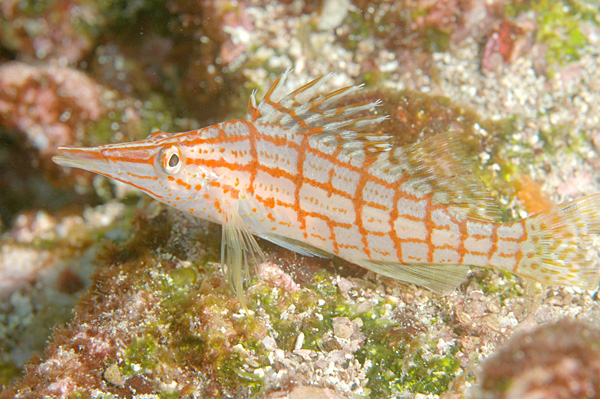
Longnose hawkfish (Oxycirrhites typus), Galápagos Islands

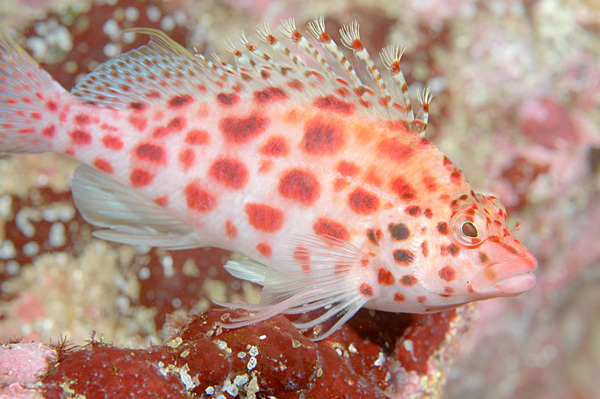
Coral hawkfish (Cirrhitichthys oxycephalus), Galápagos Islands

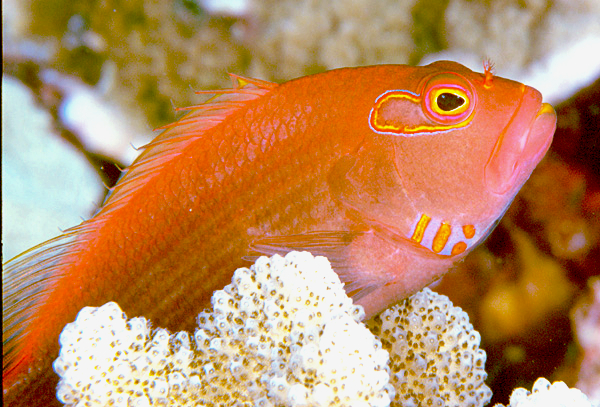
Arc-eye hawkfish (Paracirrhites arcatus), Hawaii

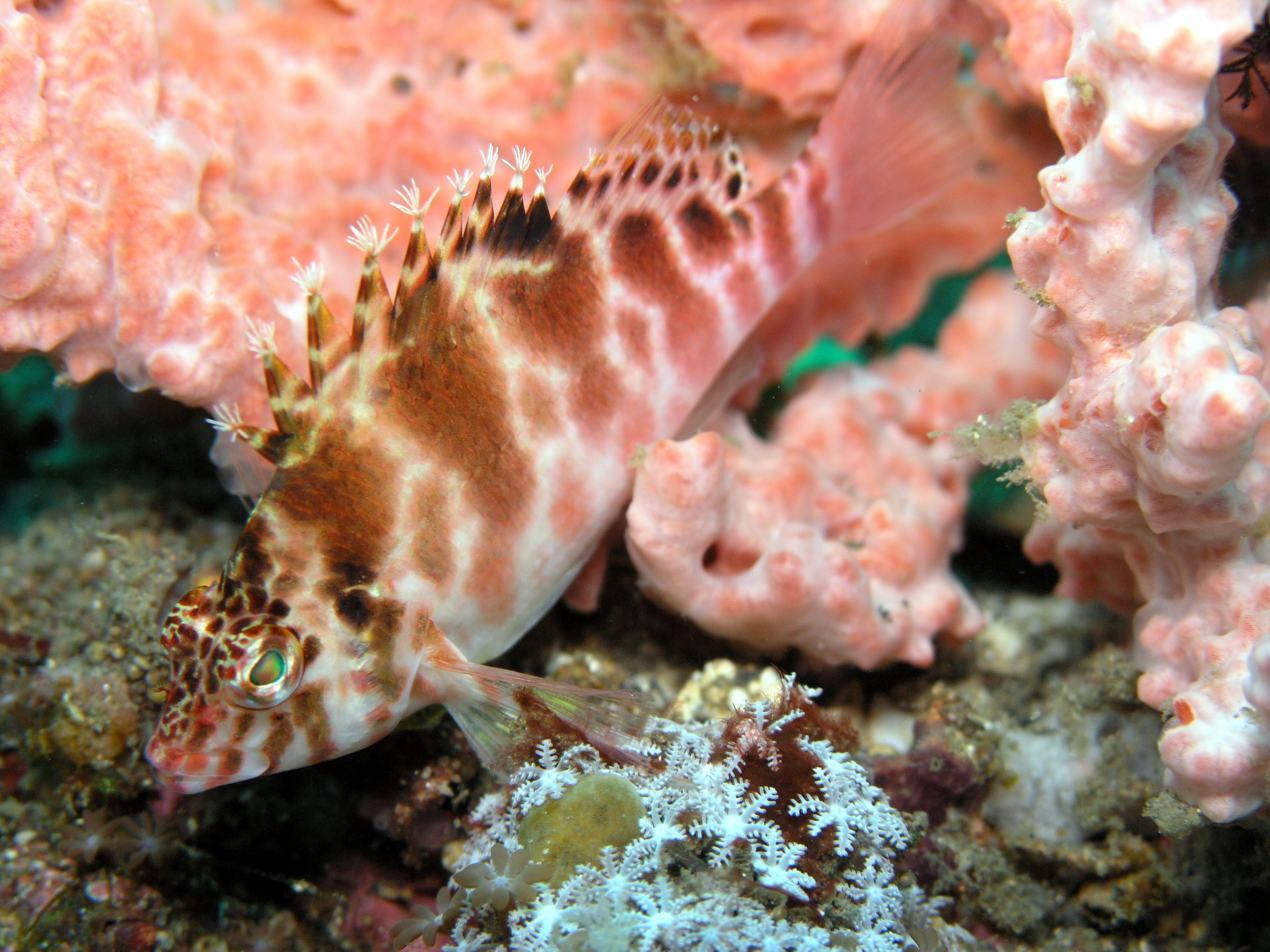
Spotted hawkfish (Cirrhitichthys aprinus), Lembeh Straits, Indonesia

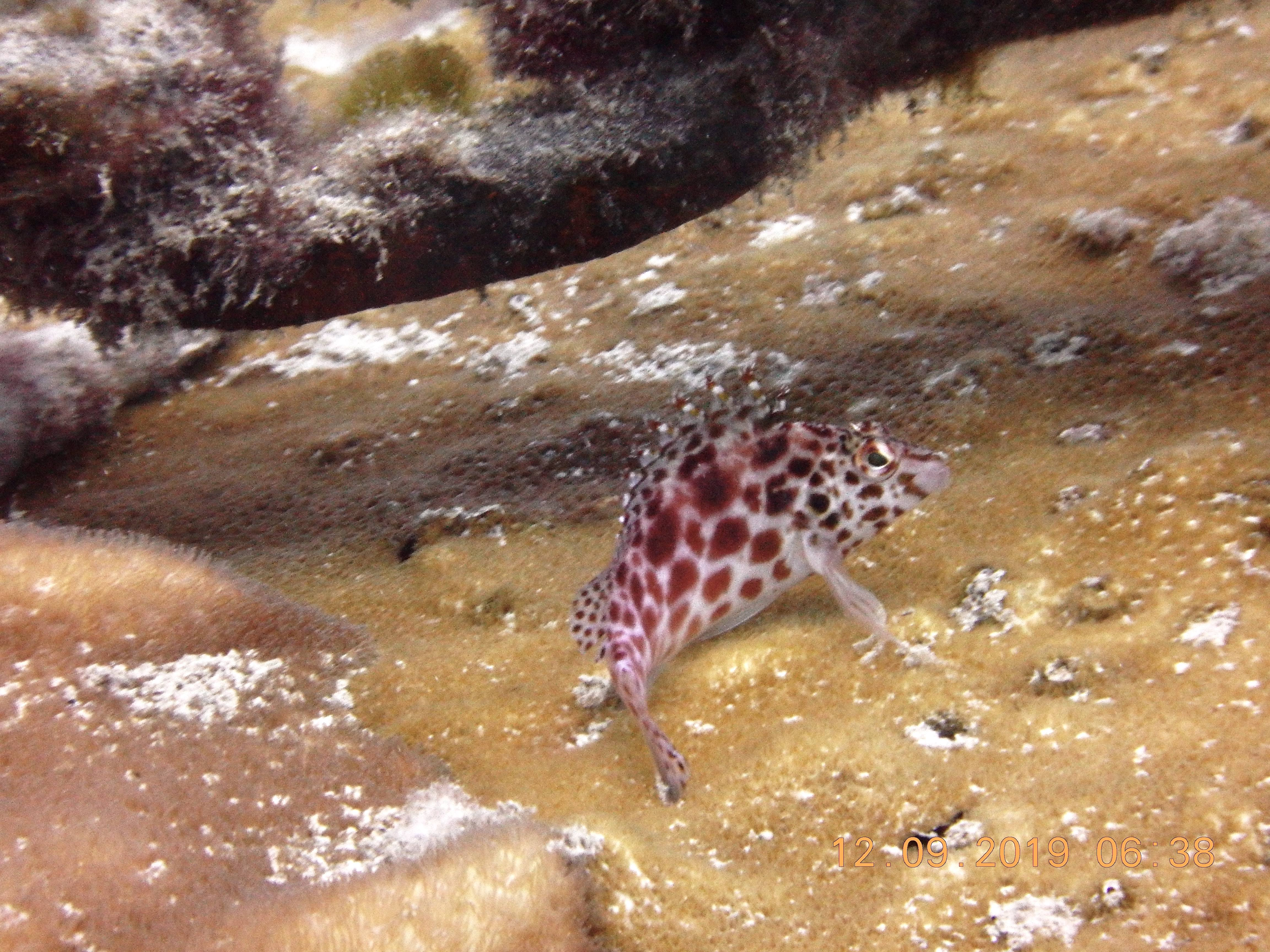
Coral hawkfish (Cirrhitichthys oxycephalus), Great Barrier Reef
