= Cirrhitus =

- C. pinnulatus (stocky hawkfish)

Scientific classification
- Kingdom: Animalia
- Phylum: Chordata
- Class: Actinopterygii
- Division: Teleostei
- Order: Centrarchiformes
- Family: Cirrhitidae
- Genus: Cirrhitus; Lacépède, 1803

Type species
- Cirrhitus maculatus Lacépède, 1803

Genus of fishes

Cirrhitus is a genus of marine ray-finned fish, hawkfishes from the family Cirrhitidae. The species in this genus are found on tropical reefs worldwide.

== Taxonomy ==
Cirrhites was first formally described as a genus in 1803 by the French naturalist Bernard Germain de Lacépède, Lacépède created it as a monotypic genus for his newly described species from Mauritius, Cirrhitus maculatus. However, it was later shown that Lacépède's C. maculatus was synonymous with Labrus pinnulatus described in manuscript by the German naturalist and explorer Johann Reinhold Forster from Tahiti. Forster's was the basis of the description published in 1801 by Johann Gottlob Schneider in his and Marcus Elieser Bloch's Systema Ichthyologiae, although Catalog of Fishes attributes the name to Forster.

=== Etymology ===
The name of this genus is derived from cirrhus meaning a "lock of hair" or a "barbel", Lacépède did not explain what he feature the name alludes to. It may be alluding to the unbranched pectoral fin rays which Lacépède termed as “barbillons”, which means "barbels" in his description of the type species of the genus C. maculatus, and which he thought to be “false” pectoral fins. Another possibility is that the name refers to cirri extending from the tips of the spines in the dorsal fin spines, although Lacépède did not mention this feature.

== Species ==
The species in this genus currently recognized by FishBase are:

Species	Common name	Image
Cirrhitus albopunctatus L. P. Schultz, 1950		
Cirrhitus atlanticus Osório, 1893	West African hawkfish	
Cirrhitus pinnulatus (J. R. Forster, 1801)	stocky hawkfish	
Cirrhitus rivulatus Valenciennes, 1846	giant hawkfish	

Cirrhitus spilotoceps from the Red Sea is variable treated as either a distinct species or a synonym of Cirrhitus pinnulatus.

Nota bene: The American ichthyologist Leonard Peter Schultz recognised three species from the widespread species C. pinnulatus: C. spilotoceps from the Red Sea, C. pinnulatus from the wider Indo-Pacific region except for Hawaii and C. maculosus from Hawaii and the Johnston Atoll. John Ernest Randall in his 1963 review of the family Cirrhitidae did not recognise these species but treated them as subspecies. Catalog of Fishes recognises C. spilotoceps as a valid species and treats C. maculosus as a subspecies of C. pinnulatus, while FishBase treats these names as synonyms of C. pinnulatus.

== Characteristics ==
Cirrhites hawkfishes have a deep body which is not highly laterally compressed. They have large heads with a blunt snout and have a fringe of cirri on the posterior margin of the anterior nostril. They have a moderately large mouth with two types of teeth, an outer row of canines and an inner row of villiform teeth. There are also teeth on the centre and sides of the roof of the mouth. The upper margin of the preoperculum either has small serrations or it smooth and the gill cover has 2 flattened spines. They have a continuous dorsal fin which has 10 spines, the membranes between the spines having deep notches and the tip of each spine has a large tuft of cirri, and 11-12 soft rays with a small incision separating the spiny portion from the soft rayed portion. The anal fin contains 3 spines and 5-7 soft rays. The caudal fin is truncate. The lower 7 pectoral fin rays are robust, with deeply incised membranes and these are notably longer than other pectoral fin rays. The upper 1 and lower 7 pectoral fin rays are unbranched. The pelvic fin has a single spine and 5 soft rays and has its origin behind the base of the pectoral fin. The scales are smooth, the intraorbital space lacks scales and there are fewer than 12 irregular scale rows, made up of small scales, on the cheeks. There are 41-49 scales on the lateral line. The published sizes vary from a standard length of 16 cm (6.3 in) for C. atlanticus to a total length of 60 cm (24 in) for C. rivulatus.

== Distribution and habitat ==
Cirrhites hawkfishes are found around the tropical seas of the world, except for the western Atlantic Ocean. They prefer hard substrates such as coral reefs, rocky reefs and rocky bottoms.
