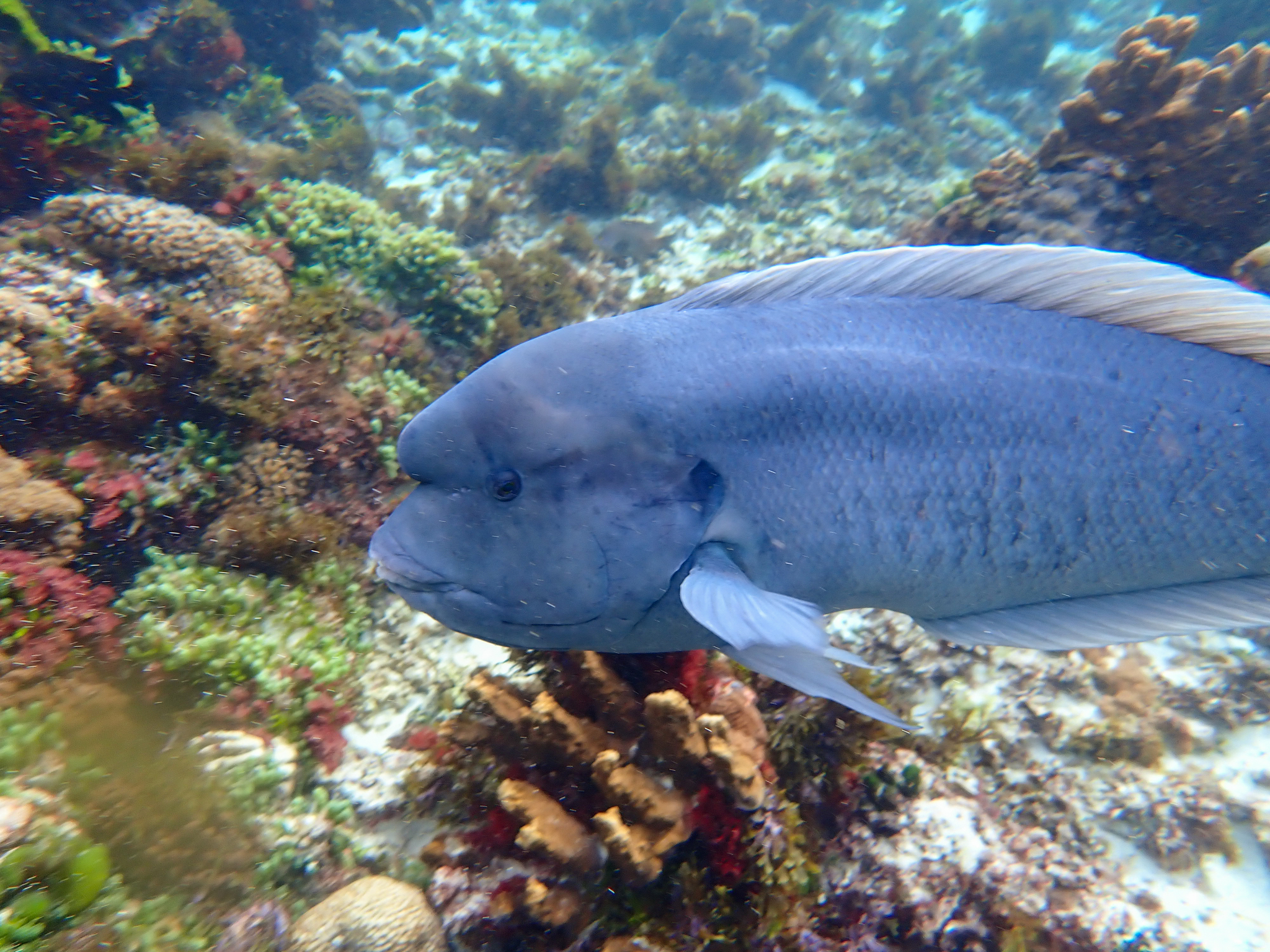
- Off Lord Howe Island

Scientific classification
- Kingdom: Animalia
- Phylum: Chordata
- Class: Actinopterygii
- Order: Labriformes
- Family: Labridae
- Genus: Coris
- Species: C. bulbifrons

Binomial name
- Coris bulbifrons J. E. Randall & Kuiter, 1982

= Coris bulbifrons =

Species of fish

Coris bulbifrons, the doubleheader, is a large species of wrasse in the Southern Pacific Ocean.

== Taxonomy ==
=== Etymology ===
The specific epithet bulbifrons comes from the Latin words "bulbus" (meaning swelling or bump), and "frons" (meaning forehead). Both the scientific name and the common name "doubleheader" allude to the large hump that develops on the foreheads of both males and females.

== Distribution ==
Lord Howe Island, Norfolk Island, Middleton Reef, and more rarely, New South Wales.

== Description ==
The doubleheader is the largest species in the genus Coris alongside the clown coris, growing up to 1 m (3 ft 3 in) in length and weighing up to 14 lb (6.4 kg). Both sexes develop a prominent hump on the forehead.

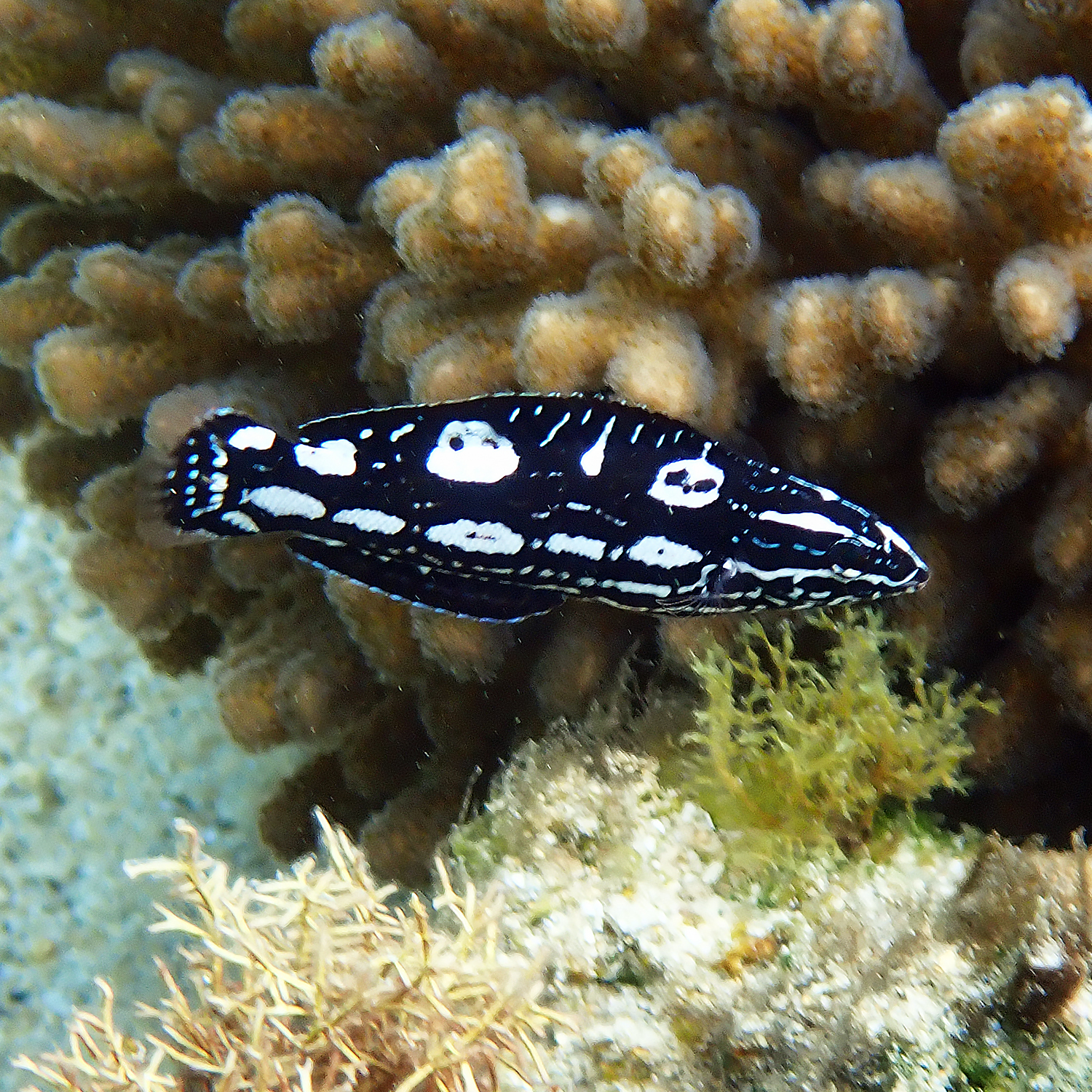
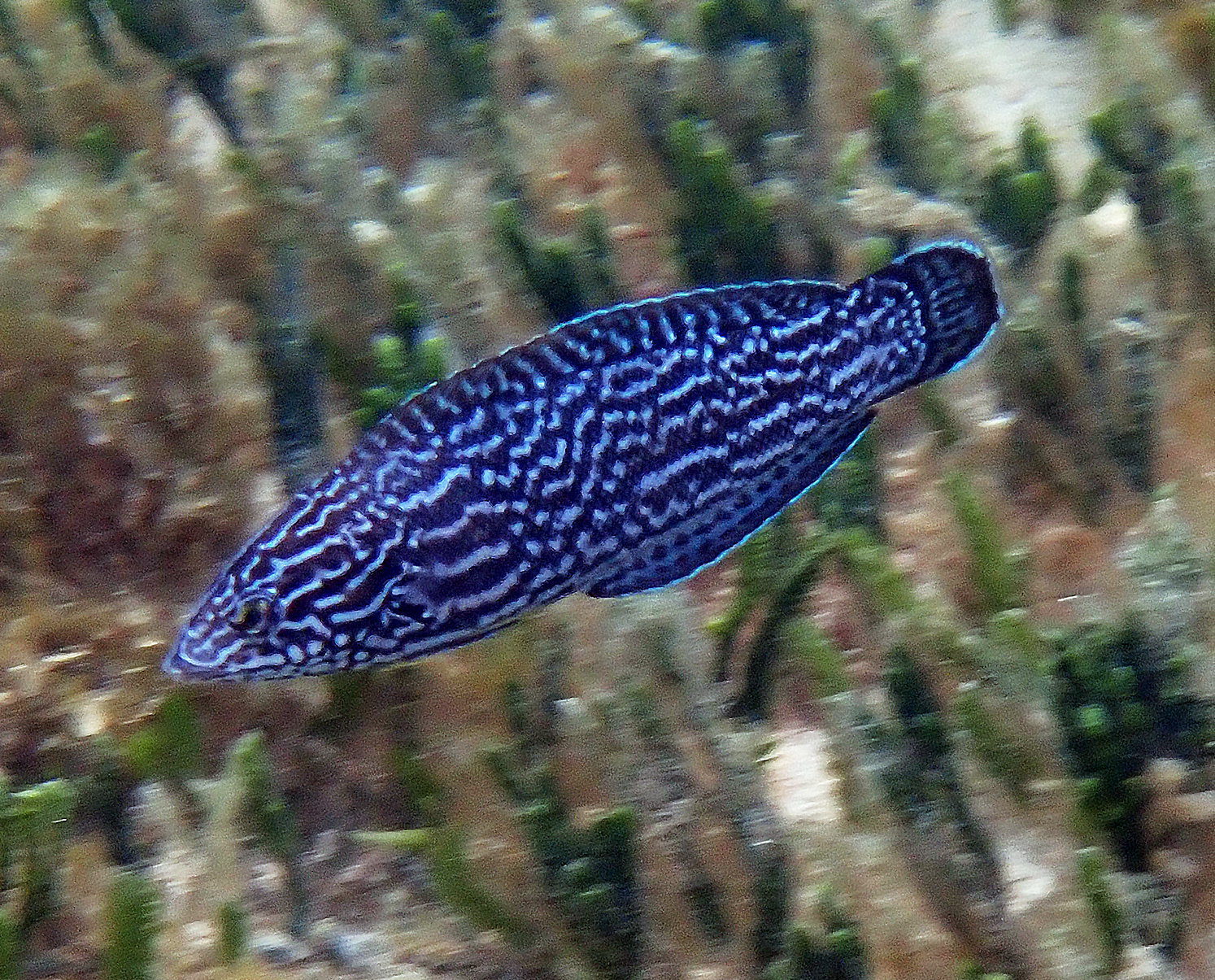
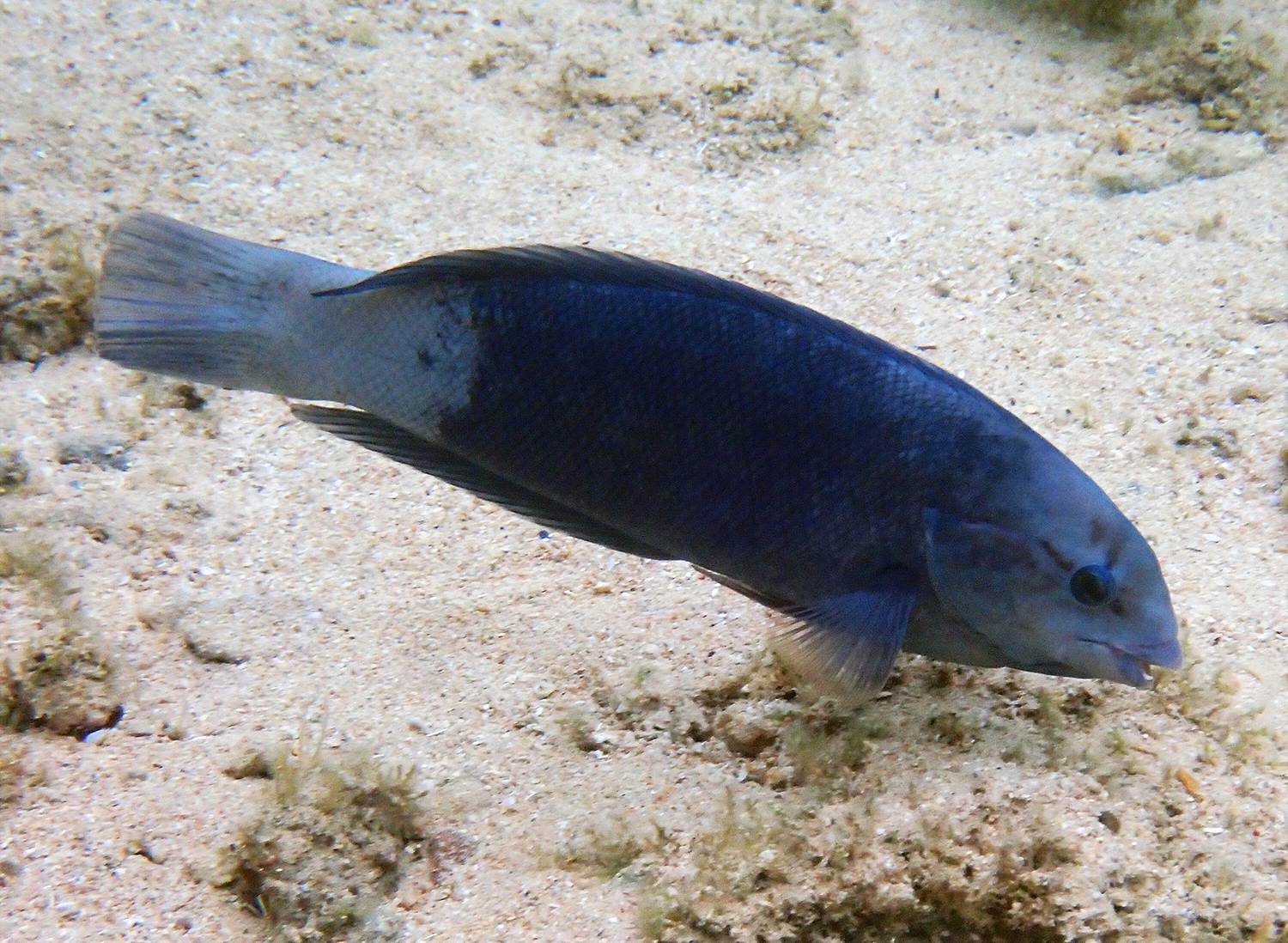
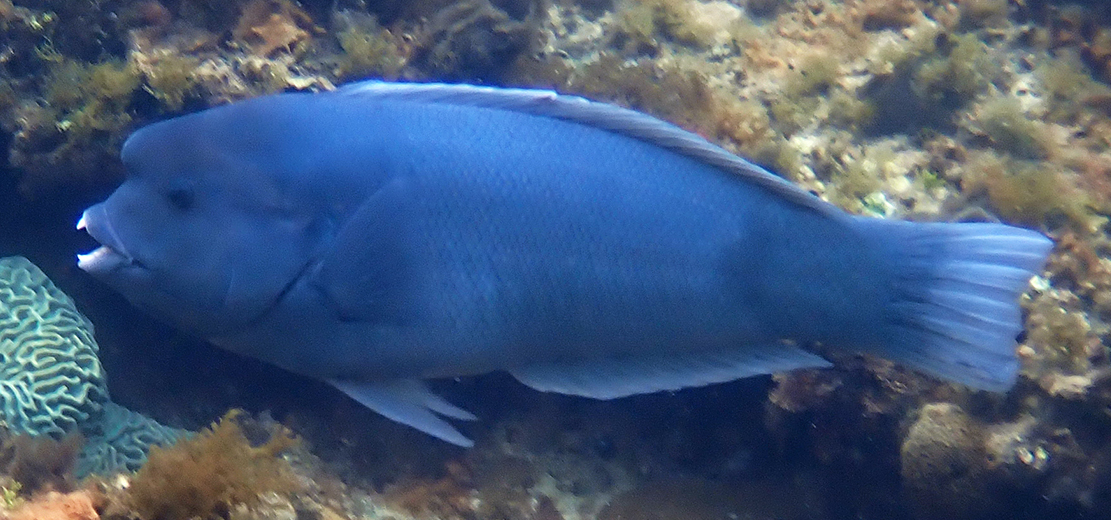
Growth series: from youngest juvenile to adult

== Diet ==
Remains of gastropods, bivalves, and crabs have been observed in the gut contents of this species.
