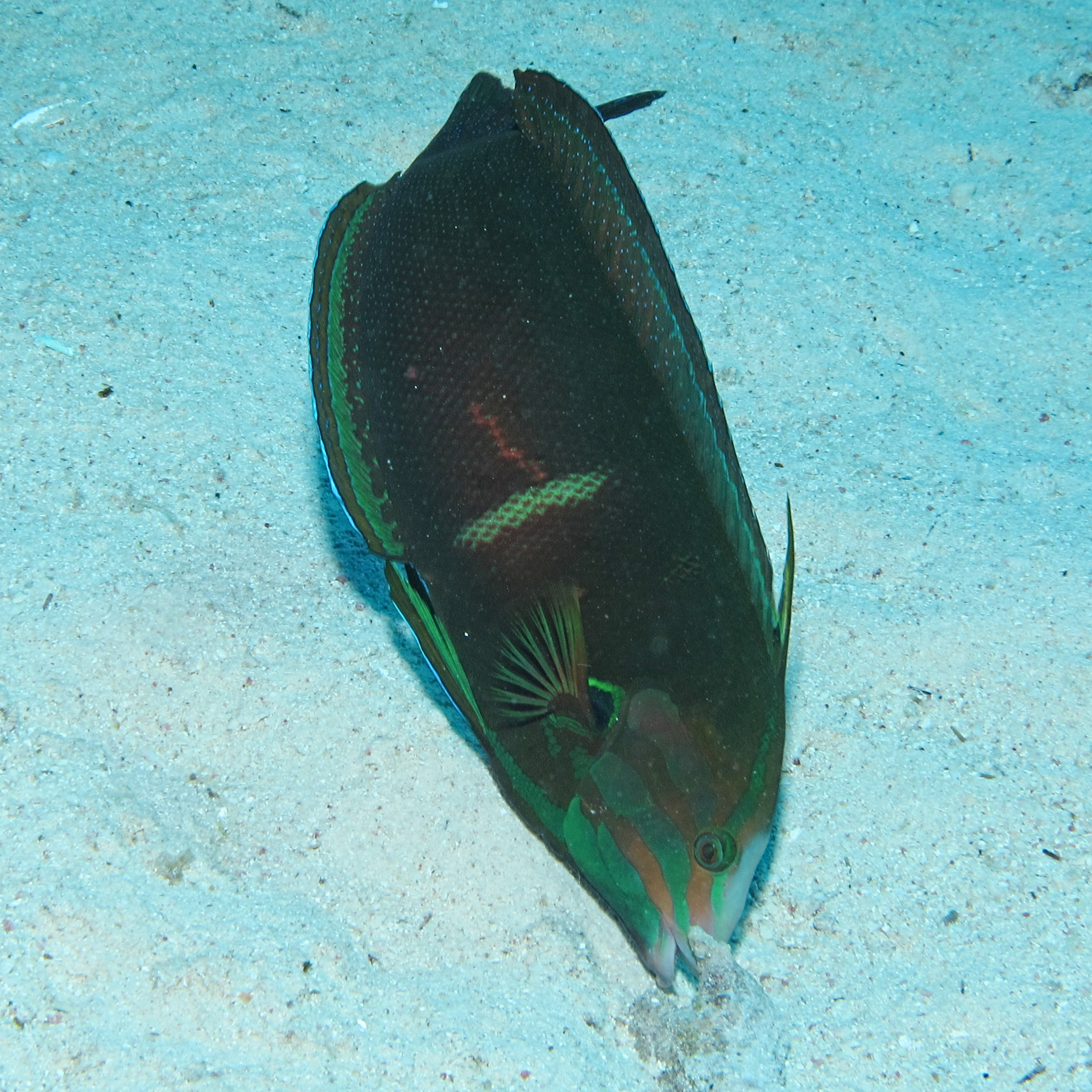

Conservation status
- Least Concern (IUCN 3.1)

Scientific classification
- Kingdom: Animalia
- Phylum: Chordata
- Class: Actinopterygii
- Order: Labriformes
- Family: Labridae
- Genus: Coris
- Species: C. cuvieri

Binomial name
- Coris cuvieri (Bennett, 1831)

Synonyms
- Julis cuvieri Bennett, 1831; Julis stellatus Valenciennes, 1839; Coris africana J. L. B. Smith, 1957

= Coris cuvieri =

Species of fish

Coris cuvieri, the African wrasse, African coris or false clowwrasse, is a species of marine ray-finned fish from the wrasse family Labridae which is found in the Indian Ocean and the Red Sea. It is sometimes found in the aquarium trade.

== Description ==
Coris cuvieri grows to a maximum length of 38 centimetres (15 in) which is slightly longer than the related Coris gaimard. It has a dullish orange-brownish background colour with green markings which become more obvious as the fish matures. Adult males have yellow and blue markings on their heads face and also have a greenish-white vertical stripe in the middle of the body, the stripe being absent in the females. There is a green spot on each body scale which contrasts with the dark reddish body. The juveniles, are similar to those of C. gaimard are bright orange-red in colour with 5 white patches with black edges along the back starting at the snout and ending on the caudal peduncle but as the juveniles grow older the differences become apparent.

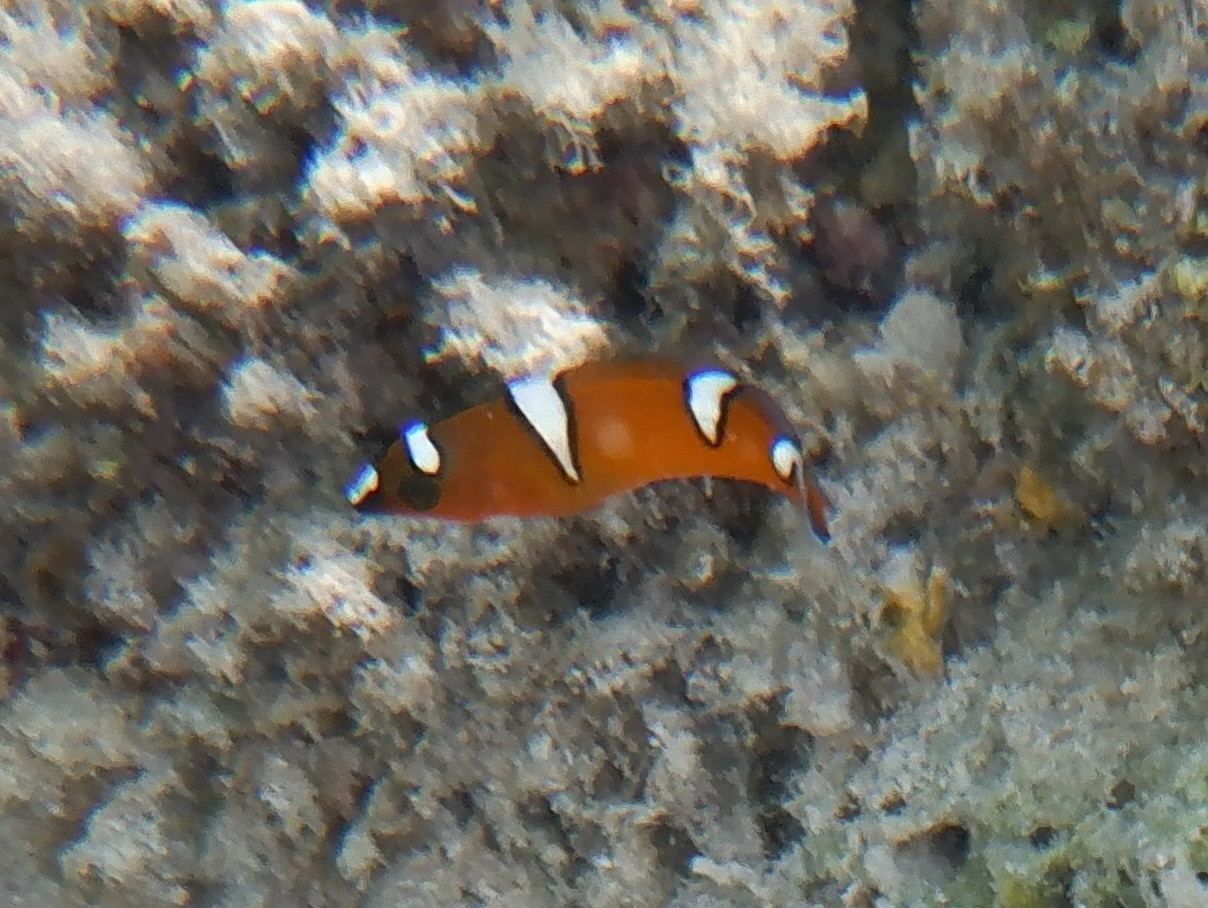
Juvenile

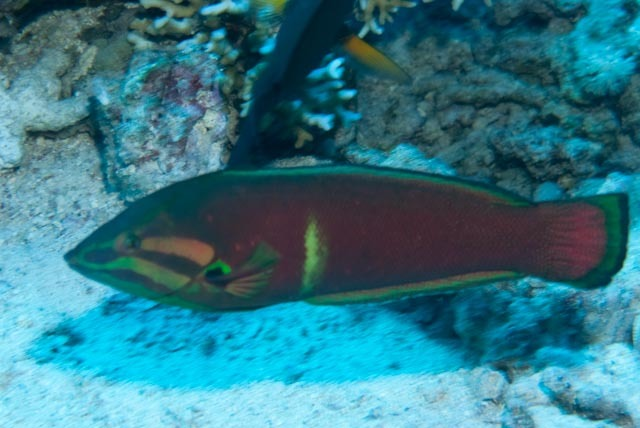
Adult male

== Distribution ==
Coris cuvieri is found in the Indian Ocean and the Red Sea, from the southern Arabian Peninsula along the east African coast to South Africa at 30°S and east as far as Sumatra and Bali.

== Habitat and biology ==
Coris cuvieri occurs over the exposed outer reef flats and in reefs within lagoons the seaward edges of reefs. It can be found in areas where there is a substrate consisting of mixed sand, coral and rubble. The juvenile fish occur in small tidal pools and in exposed reef flats with algae covered rubble. It is generally a solitary species which feeds largey on prey with hard shells such as crustaceans, molluscs and sea urchins. While foraging it turns over rocks, searching for hidden invertebrates. It is oviparous and when breeding the males and female form a pair. A single dominant male will guard a harem of several smaller females.

== Human use ==
Coris cuvieri is used in the aquarium trade, although the similar Coris gaimard is preferred, the juveniles of the two species are very similar and can be confused.

== Species description and naming ==
This species was formally described in 1831 as Julis cuvieri by the naturalist Edward Turner Bennett with the type locality given as Mauritius. The specific name honours the French naturalist Georges Cuvier (1790-1832), who described it under the name Julis aygula but which was determined by Bennett to be a separate species.
