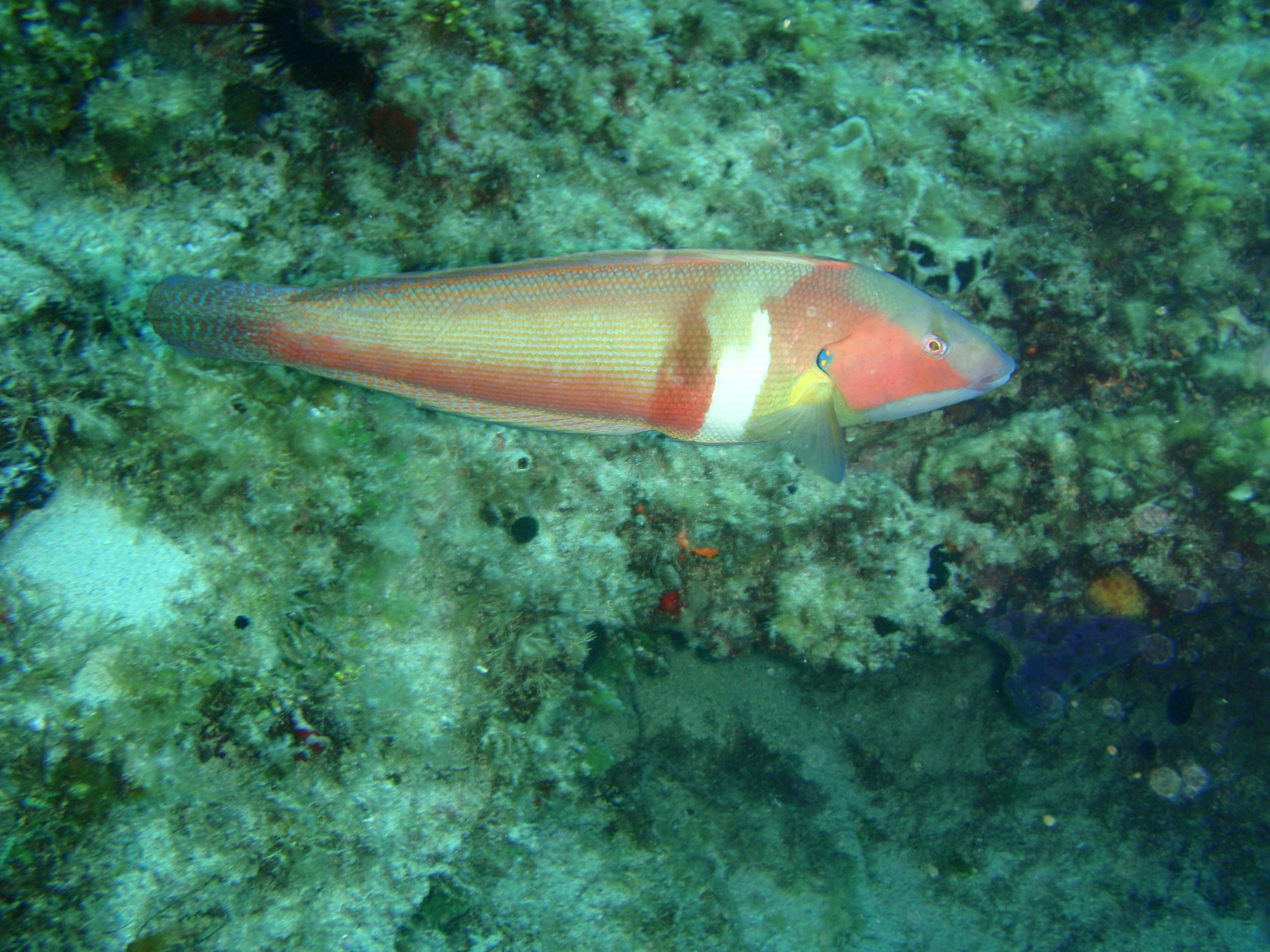

Conservation status
- Least Concern (IUCN 3.1)

Scientific classification
- Kingdom: Animalia
- Phylum: Chordata
- Class: Actinopterygii
- Order: Labriformes
- Family: Labridae
- Genus: Coris
- Species: C. auricularis

Binomial name
- Coris auricularis Valenciennes, 1839

Synonyms
- Julis auricularis

= Coris auricularis =

Species of fish

Coris auricularis, the western king wrasse, is a species of ray-finned fish in the genus Coris. The scientific name of the species was first validly published in 1839 by Valenciennes.
