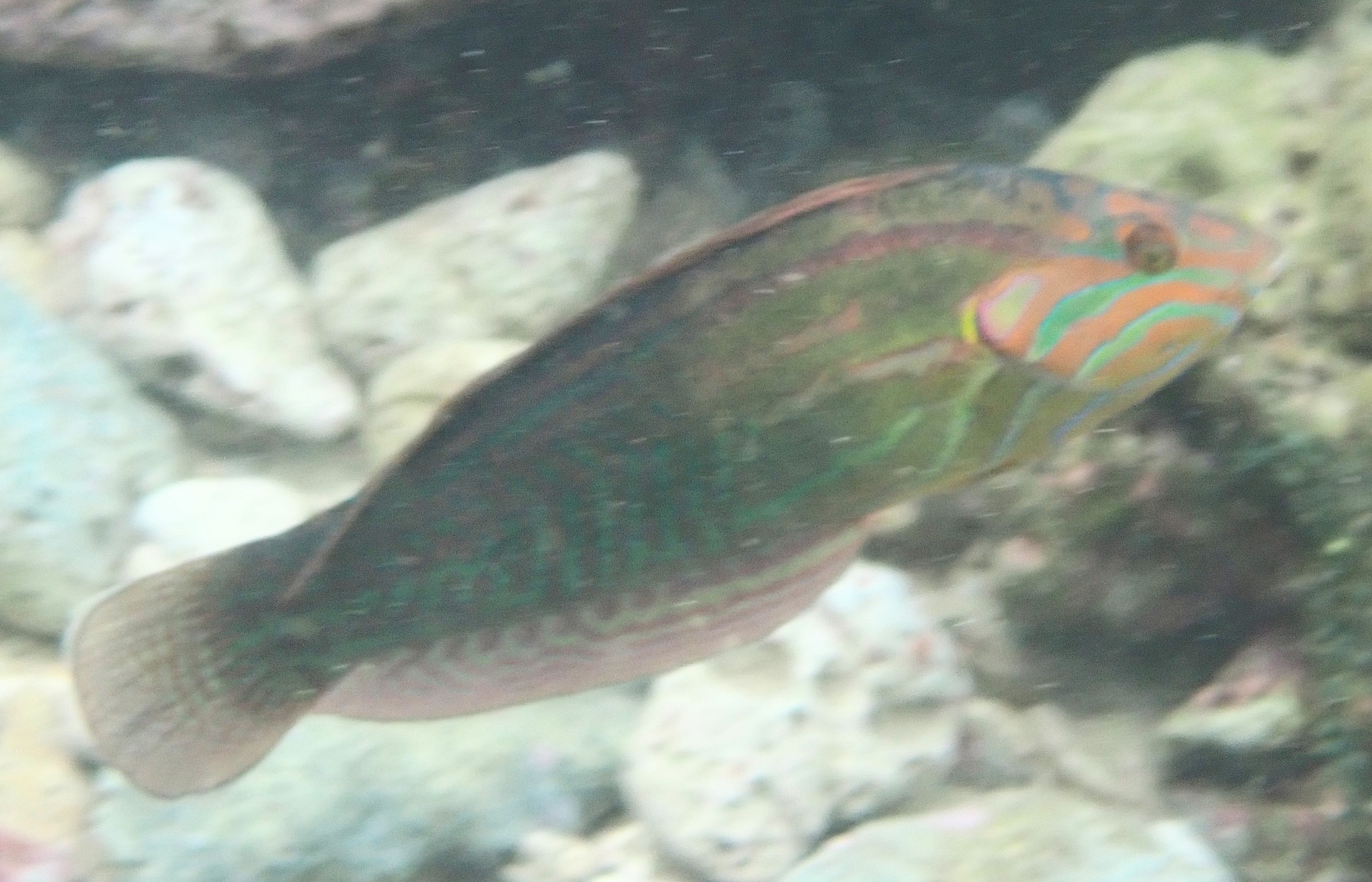

Conservation status
- Least Concern (IUCN 3.1)

Scientific classification
- Kingdom: Animalia
- Phylum: Chordata
- Class: Actinopterygii
- Order: Labriformes
- Family: Labridae
- Genus: Coris
- Species: C. venusta

Binomial name
- Coris venusta Vaillant & Sauvage, 1875

Synonyms
- Hemicoris remedius Jenkins, 1901

= Coris venusta =

Species of fish

Coris venusta, the elegant coris, is a species of ray-finned fish. The scientific name of the species was first validly published in 1875 by Vaillant & Sauvage.
