= Coris musume =

Conservation status
- Least Concern (IUCN 3.1)

Scientific classification
- Kingdom: Animalia
- Phylum: Chordata
- Class: Actinopterygii
- Order: Labriformes
- Family: Labridae
- Genus: Coris
- Species: C. musume

Binomial name
- Coris musume Jordan & Snyder, 1904

Synonyms
- Julis musume Jordan & Snyder, 1904

Species of fish

Coris musume, the Japanese coris, is a species of ray-finned fish. The scientific name of the species was first validly published in 1904 by Jordan & Snyder.
