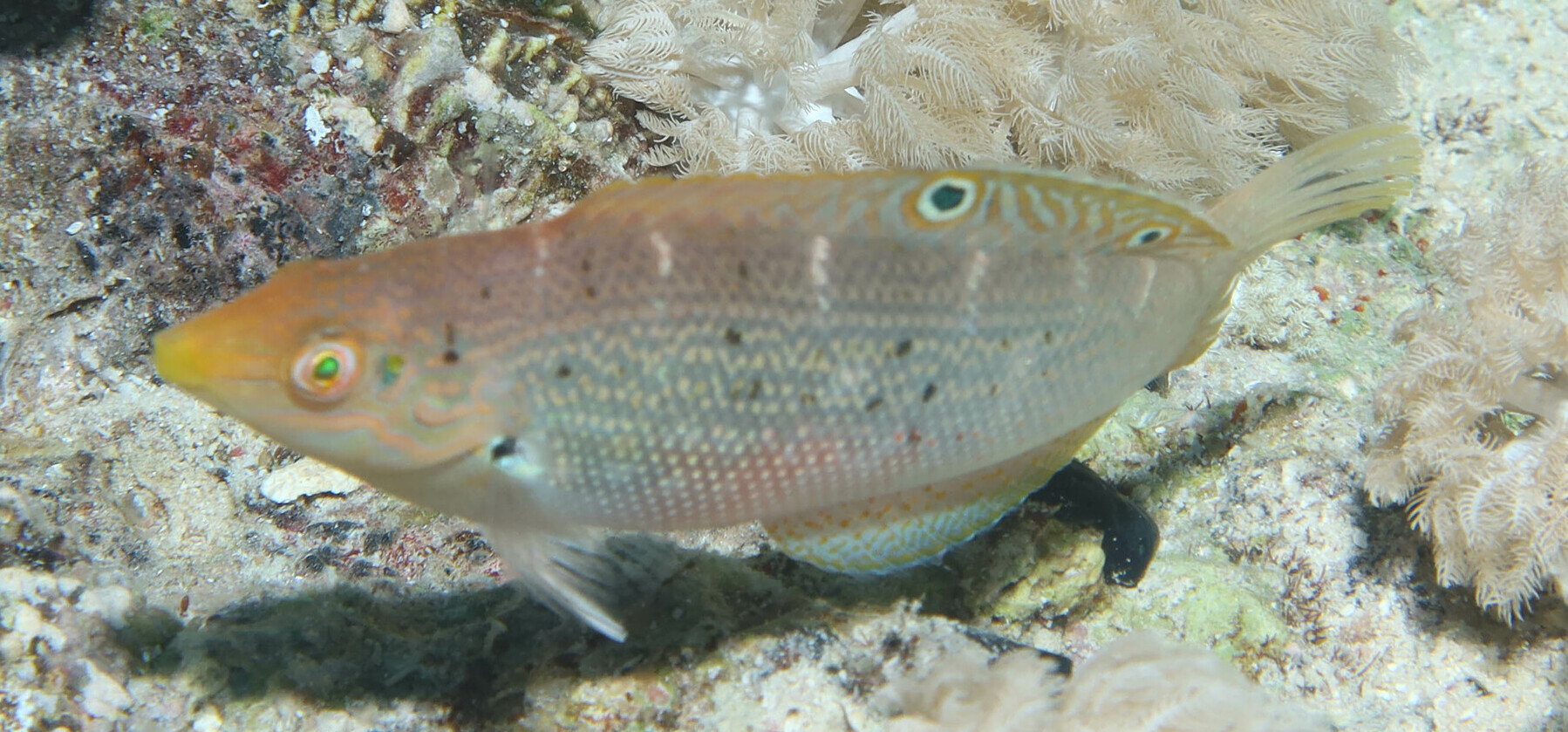

Conservation status
- Least Concern (IUCN 3.1)

Scientific classification
- Kingdom: Animalia
- Phylum: Chordata
- Class: Actinopterygii
- Order: Labriformes
- Family: Labridae
- Genus: Coris
- Species: C. variegata

Binomial name
- Coris variegata Rüppell, 1835

= Coris variegata =

Species of fish

Coris variegata, the dapple coris, is a species of ray-finned fish. The scientific name of the species was first validly published in 1835 by Rüppell.
