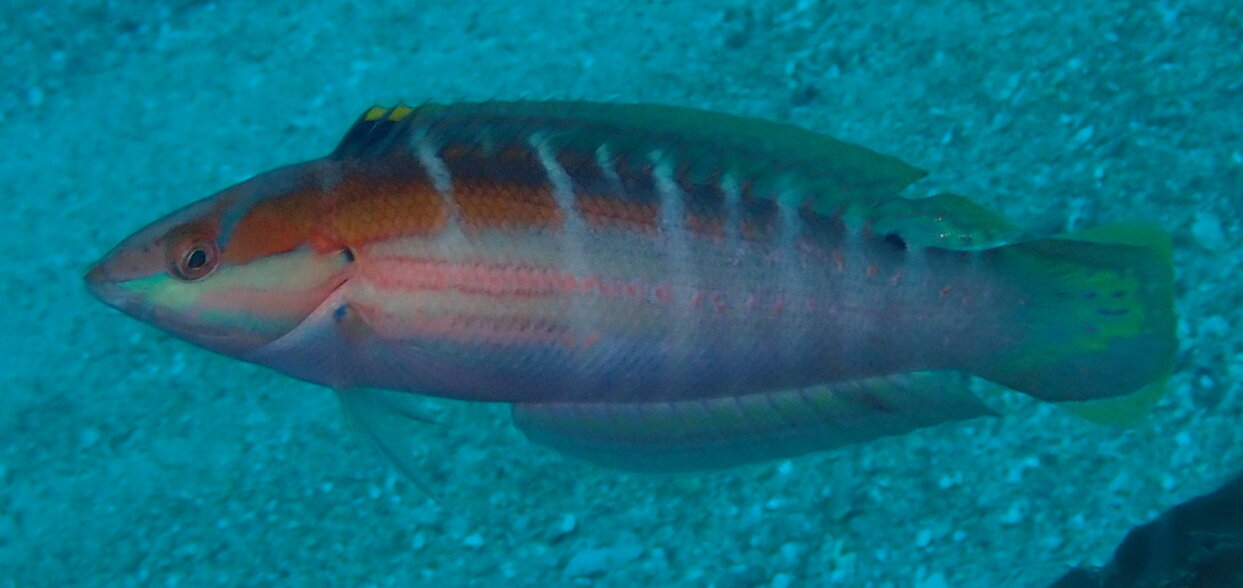

Conservation status
- Least Concern (IUCN 3.1)

Scientific classification
- Kingdom: Animalia
- Phylum: Chordata
- Class: Actinopterygii
- Order: Labriformes
- Family: Labridae
- Genus: Coris
- Species: C. dorsomacula

Binomial name
- Coris dorsomacula Fowler, 1908

Synonyms
- Coris dorsumacula Fowler, 1908; Coris dorsomaculata Fowler, 1908

= Coris dorsomacula =

Species of fish

Coris dorsomacula the pale-barred coris, is a species of ray-finned fish in the genus Coris The scientific name of the species was first validly published in 1908 by Fowler.
