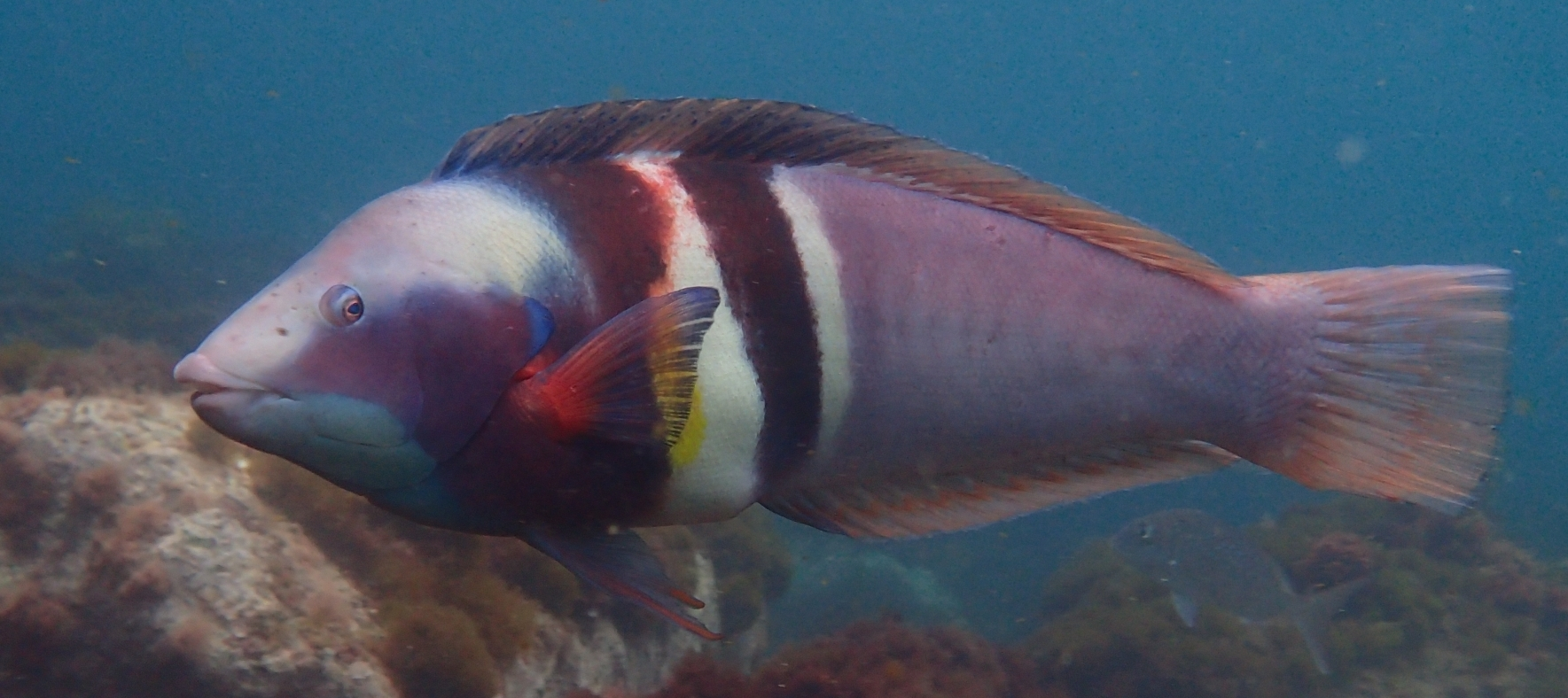

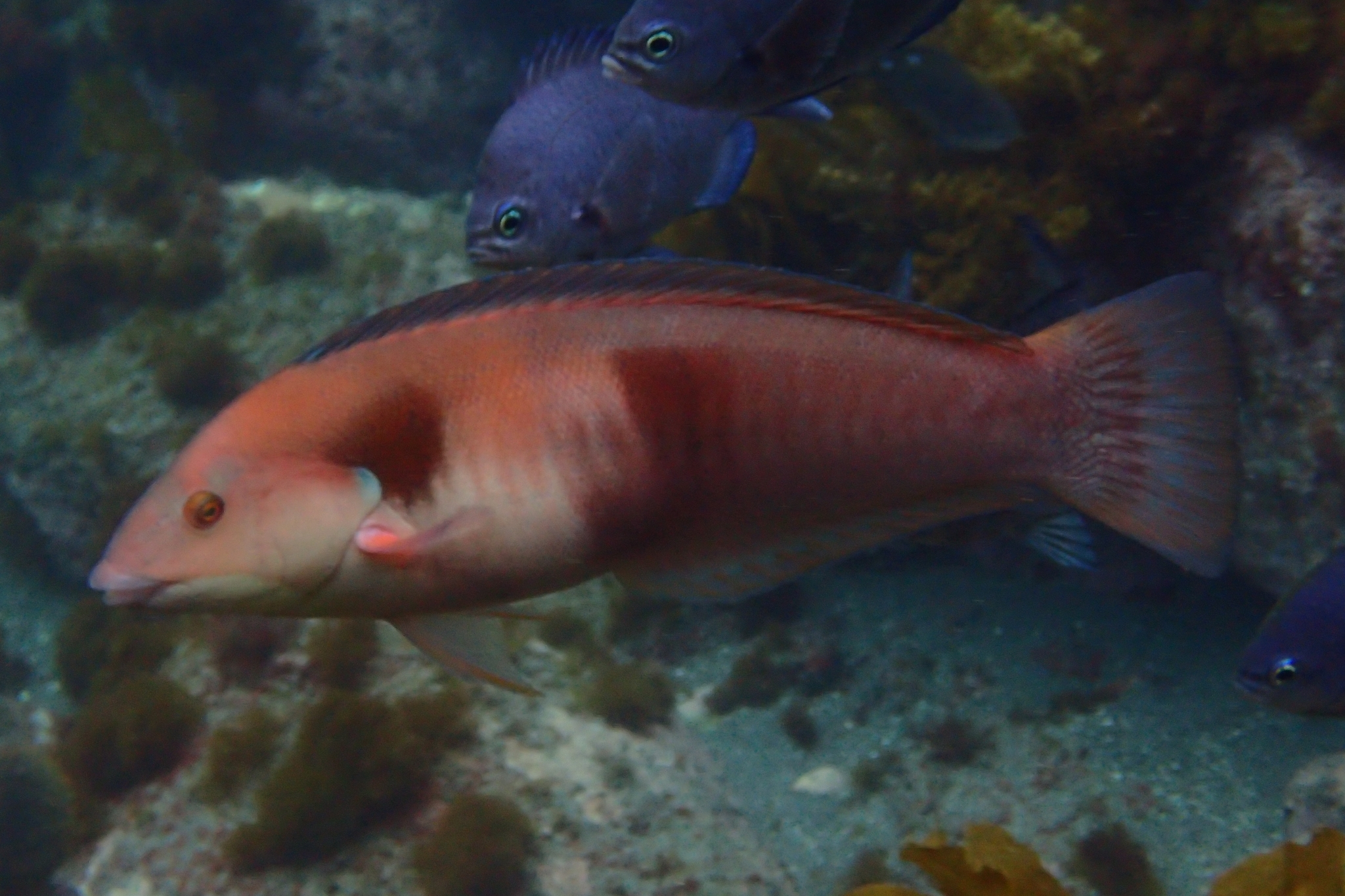
- Male (top) and female (bottom)

Conservation status
- Least Concern (IUCN 3.1)

Scientific classification
- Kingdom: Animalia
- Phylum: Chordata
- Class: Actinopterygii
- Order: Labriformes
- Family: Labridae
- Genus: Coris
- Species: C. sandeyeri

Binomial name
- Coris sandeyeri (Hector, 1884)

Synonyms
- Cymolutes sandeyeri Hector, 1884; Coris sandageri (Hector, 1884); Coris rex E. P. Ramsay & J. D. Ogilby, 1886; Coris trimaculata J. D. Ogilby, 1888

= Sandager's wrasse =

Species of fish

Sandager's wrasse (Coris sandeyeri) is a species of wrasse native to the southwestern Pacific Ocean ranging from Australia to New Zealand and the Kermadec Islands. This species can be found on reefs down to depths of about 60 metres (200 ft). It can reach a length of 25 centimetres (9.8 in) TL. It can also be found in the aquarium trade.

== Etymology ==
The fish was named after Andreas Fleming Stewart Sandager, a lighthouse keeper in New Zealand who collected the first specimen. As the scientific name has sandeyeri as the specific epithet, a proposal was made in 1927 to change it to "sandageri" on the theory that the original description constituted a misspelling. However, in 2011, it was shown that "Sandager" was also spelled "Sandeyer" at that time and thus that the original spelling of the scientific name should stand.

== Behavior ==
The wrasses live in small shoals consisting of one male and several 'attendant' females and juveniles. In the presence of the male, all juveniles will grow into females, but when the male dies or is removed from the shoal, the group's dominant female then undergoes physiological changes to convert herself into a male. (Greenwood. T., et al., 2012)

== Description ==
The male fish has a deeper body, and differs significantly in colouration. For example, the male has very distinctive bands, whereas the female is paler in colour and only has 2 dark spots.(Greenwood. T. et al., 2012)

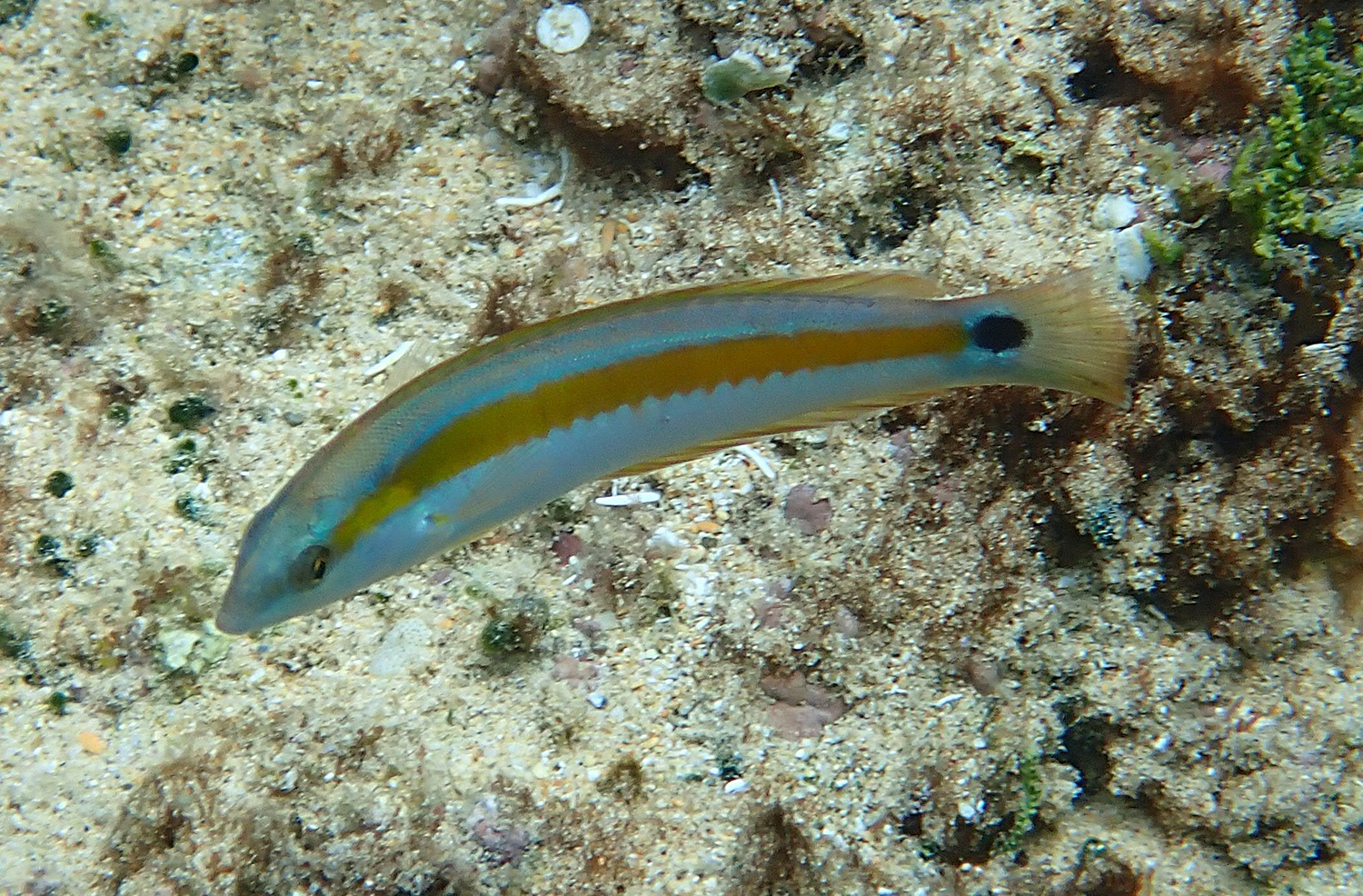
Juvenile

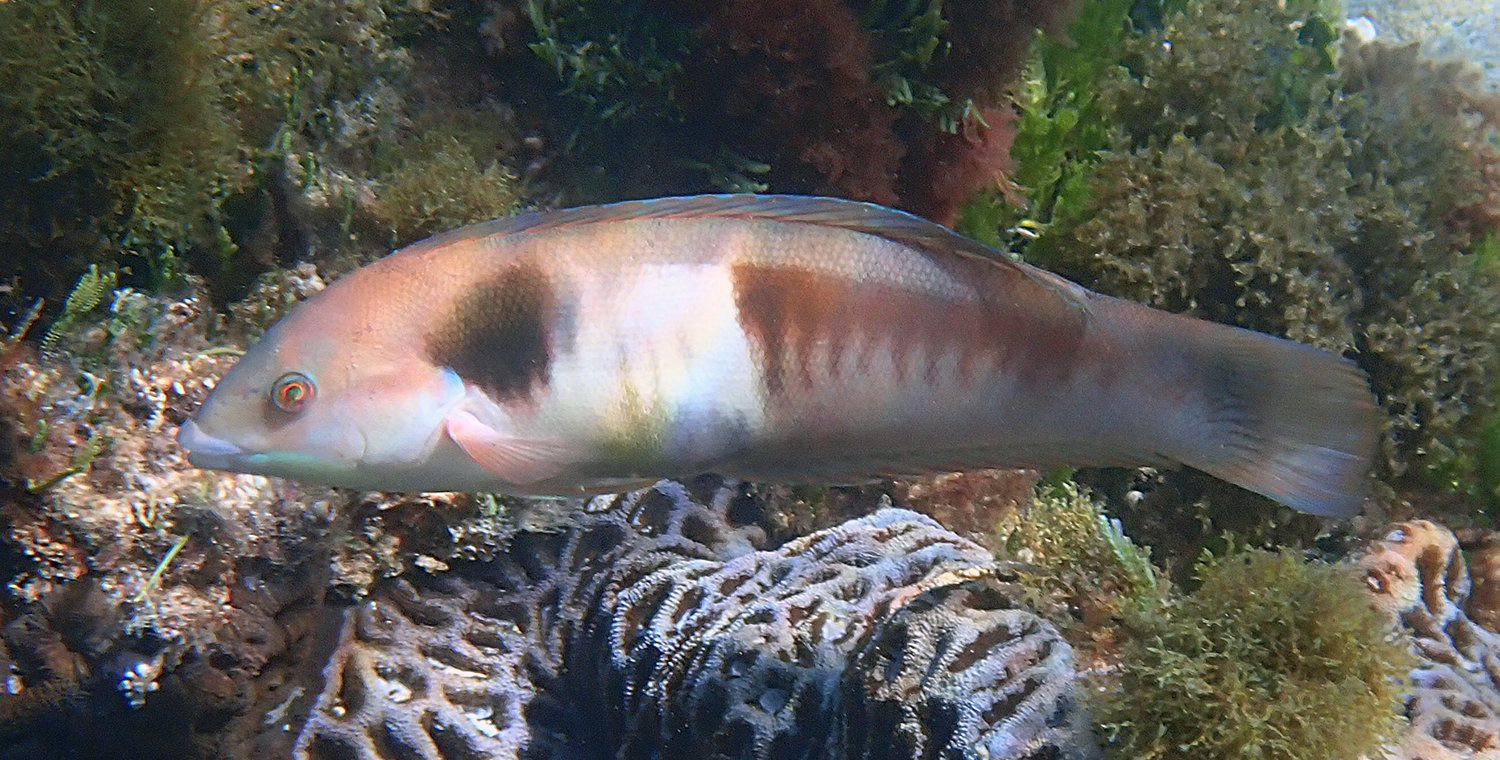
Female

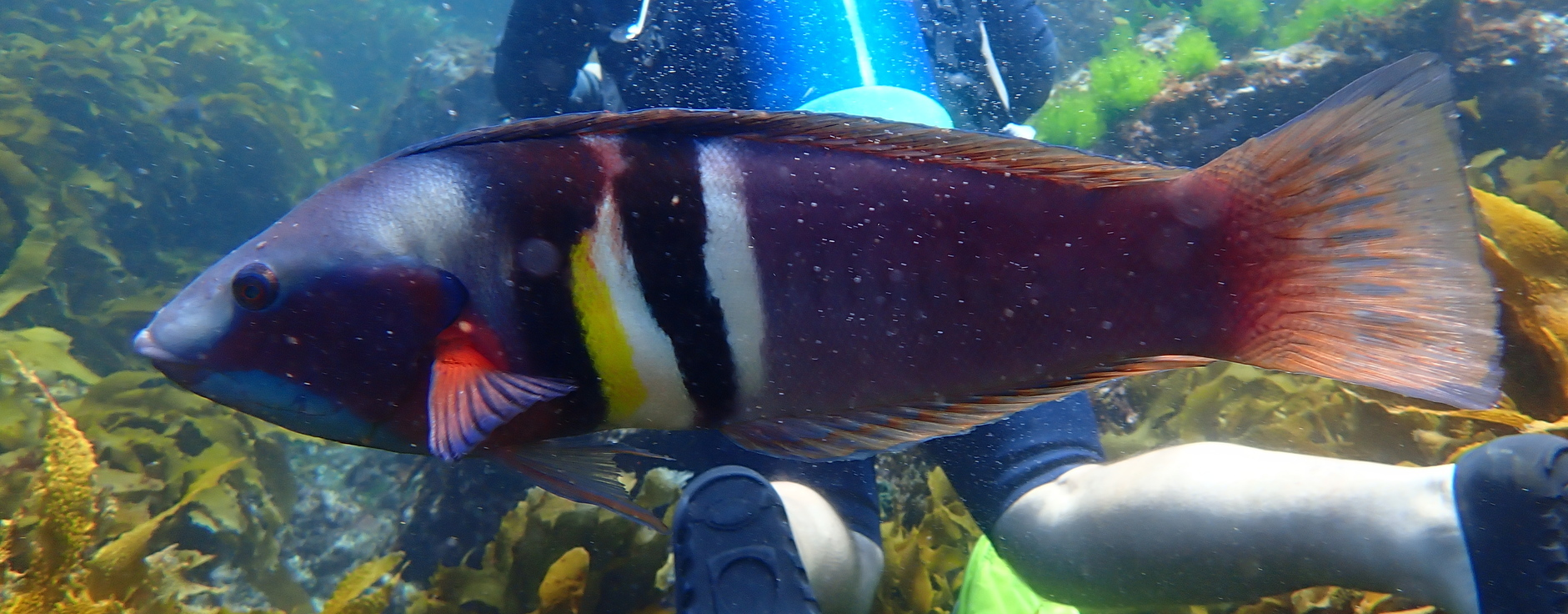
Male
