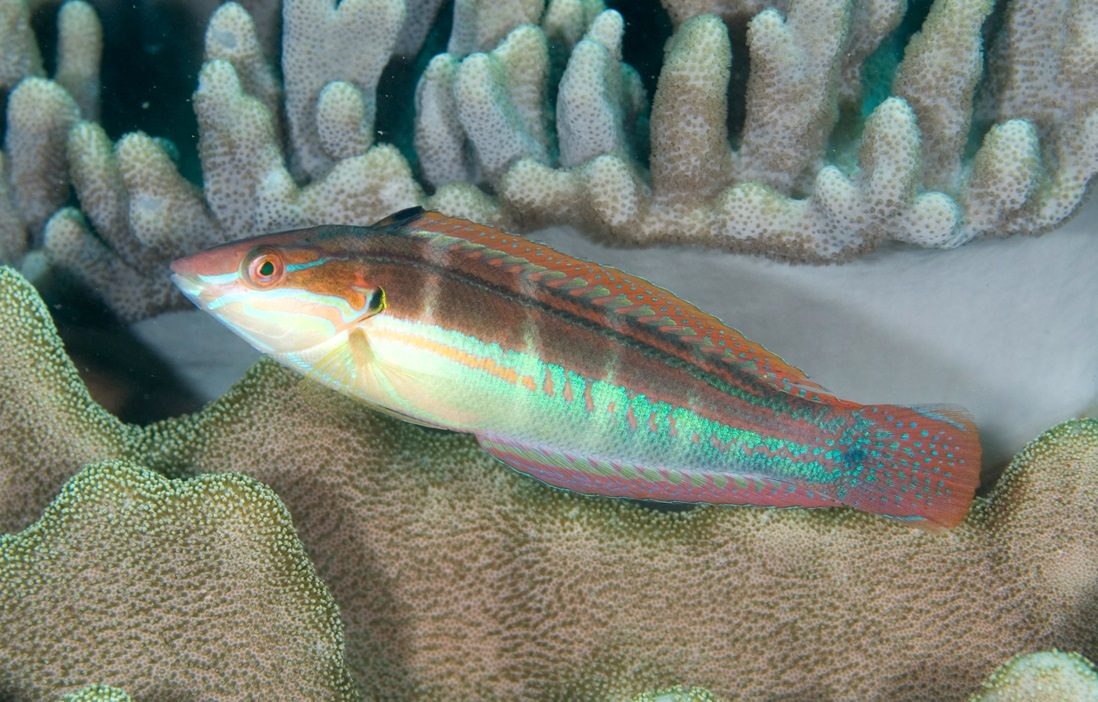

Conservation status
- Least Concern (IUCN 3.1)

Scientific classification
- Kingdom: Animalia
- Phylum: Chordata
- Class: Actinopterygii
- Order: Labriformes
- Family: Labridae
- Genus: Coris
- Species: C. caudimacula

Binomial name
- Coris caudimacula (Quoy & Gaimard, 1834)

= Coris caudimacula =

Species of fish

Coris caudimacula, the spot-tail coris, is a fish found in the Indian Ocean, the Red Sea and on the east coast of Africa from Oman to East London. The fish has already been spotted in Mossel Bay.

== Gallery ==
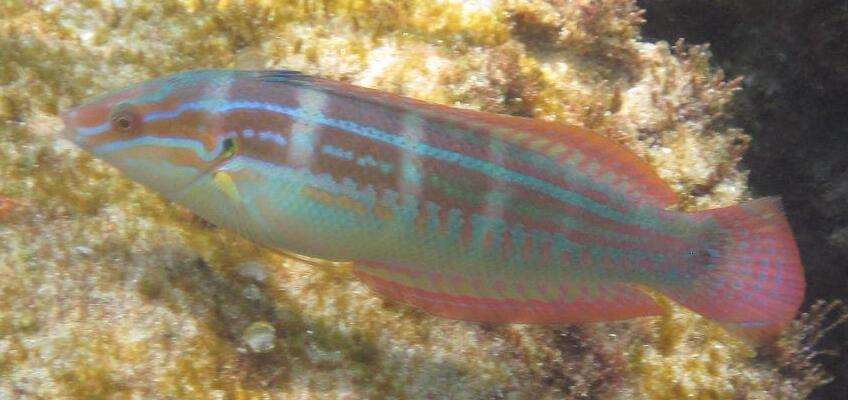

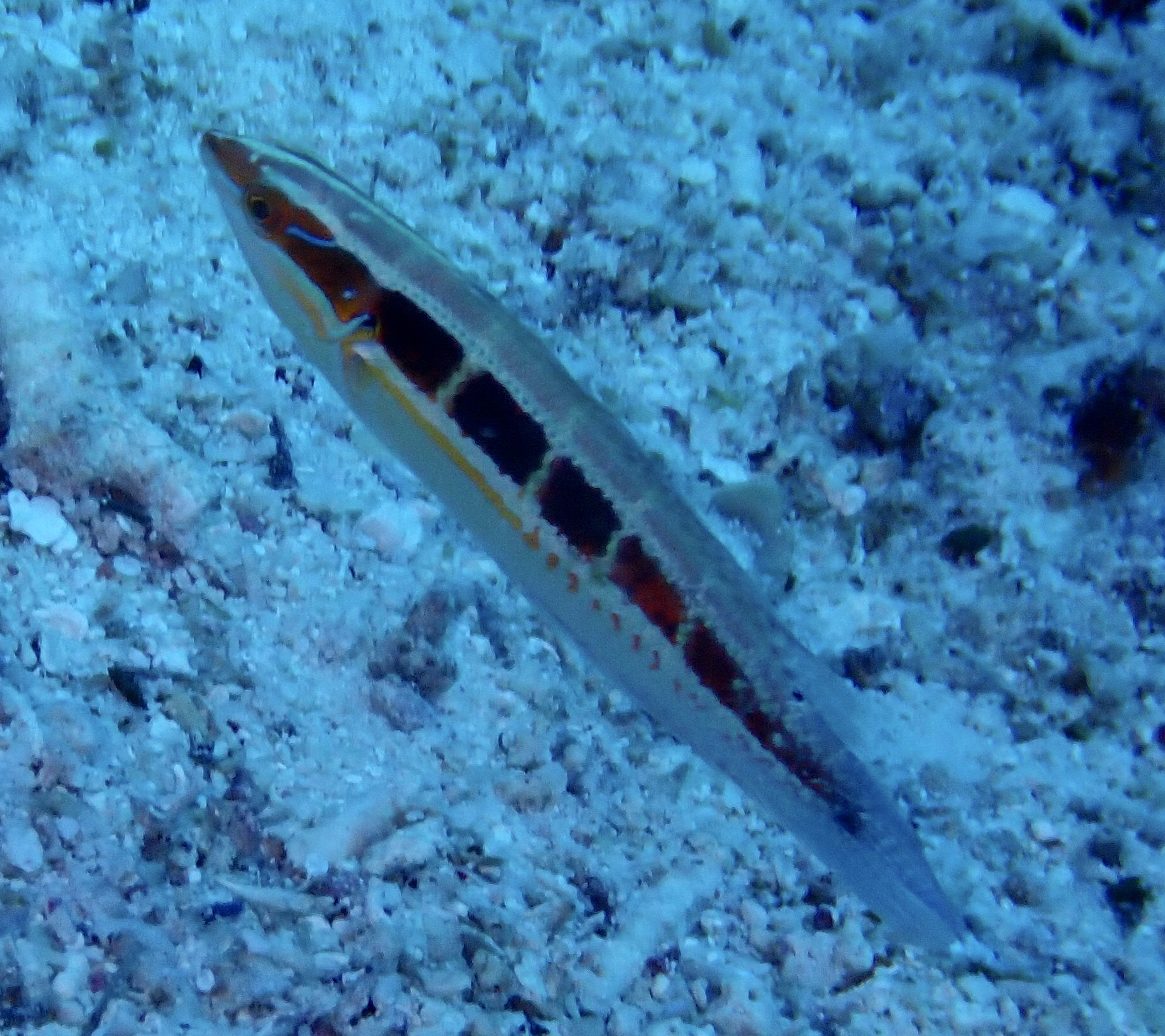
Female

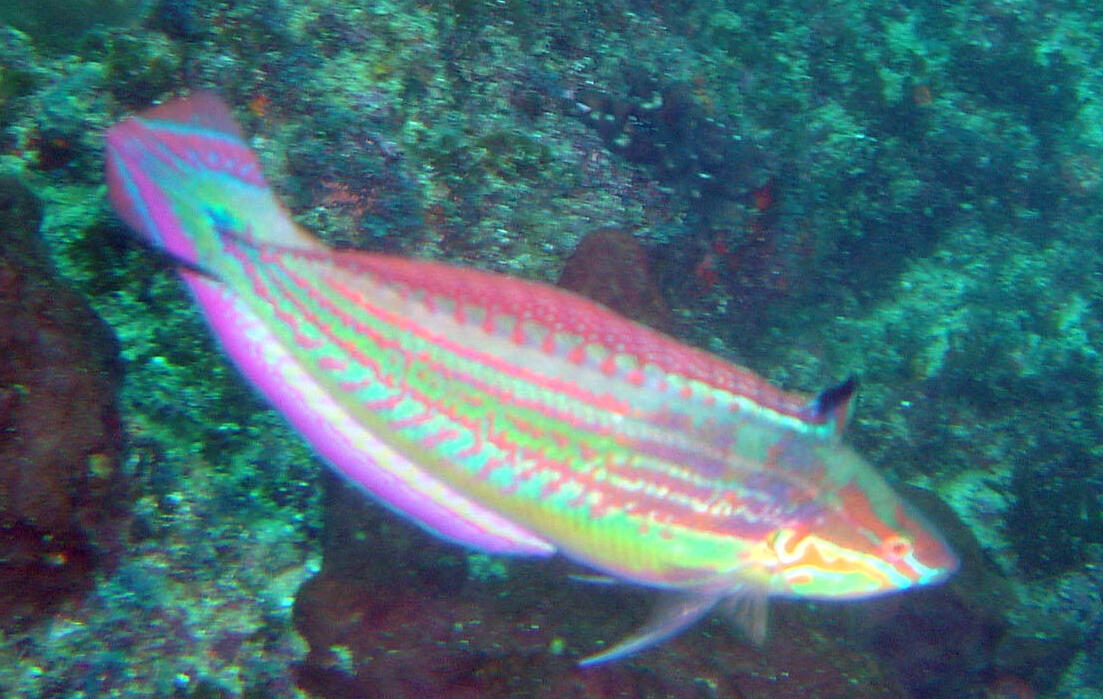
Male

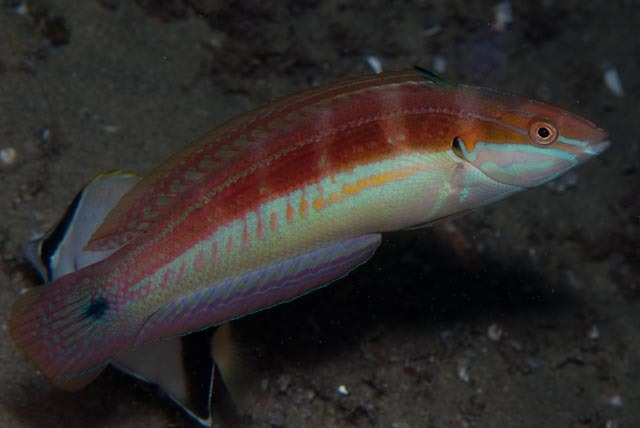

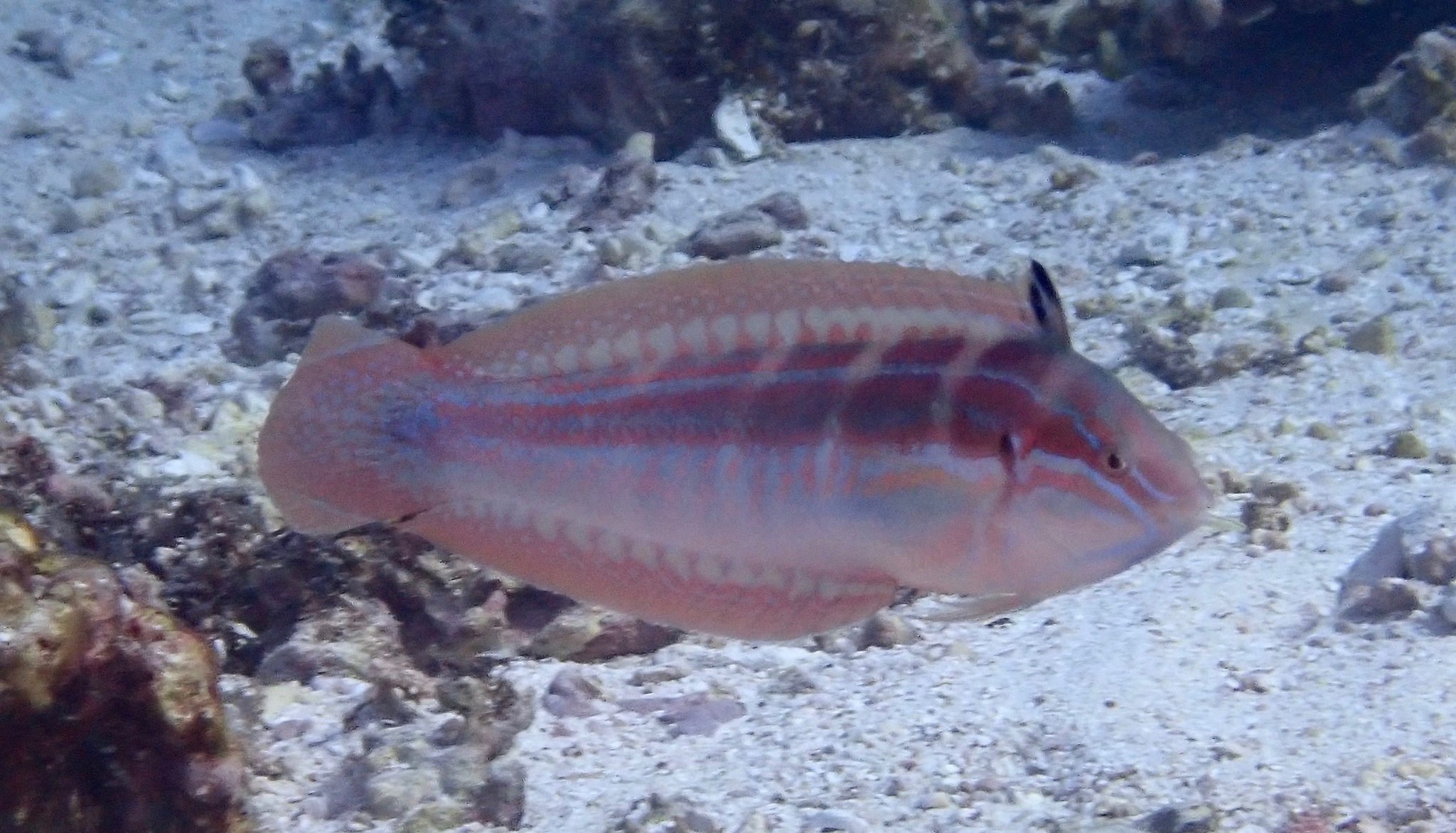
