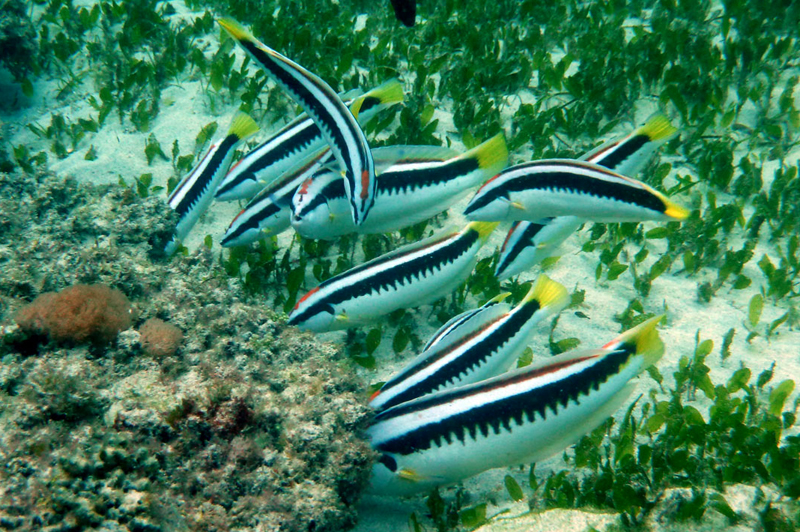

Conservation status
- Least Concern (IUCN 3.1)

Scientific classification
- Kingdom: Animalia
- Phylum: Chordata
- Class: Actinopterygii
- Order: Labriformes
- Family: Labridae
- Genus: Coris
- Species: C. picta

Binomial name
- Coris picta (Bloch & J. G. Schneider, 1801)

Synonyms
- Labrus pictus Bloch & J. G. Schneider, 1801; Coris pictus (Bloch & J. G. Schneider, 1801); Coris semicincta Ramsay, 1883

= Comb wrasse =

Species of fish

The comb wrasse or combfish (Coris picta) is a species of wrasse of the genus Coris, native to the western Pacific Ocean off eastern Australia and around offshore islands off north eastern New Zealand. This species can be found in areas with sandy substrates around rock reefs at depths from 3 to 25 m (9.8 to 82.0 ft). It can reach 25 cm (9.8 in) in total length. This species can also be found in the aquarium trade.

== Description ==
The combfish has a long, white body with a prominent, wide, black stripe from its mouth across its eye along the body to the end of the tail. The lower margin of the stripe is wavy and comb-like, giving the fish its common name. The portion of the stripe on the tail fin turns yellow during the breeding season. Also, a thin, red stripe runs along the top of the body from the mouth, along the base of the dorsal fin, for the fin's full length.

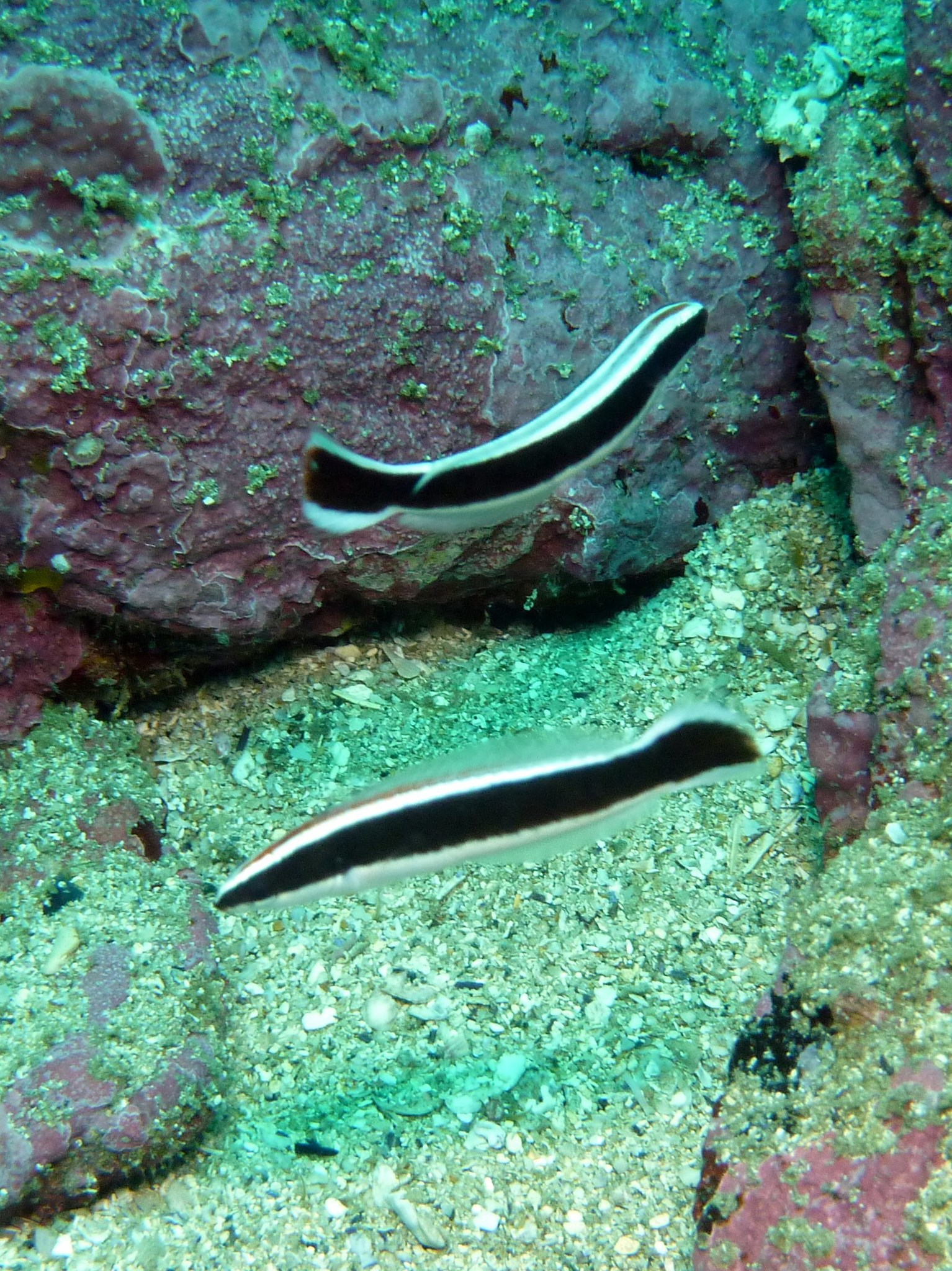
Juveniles

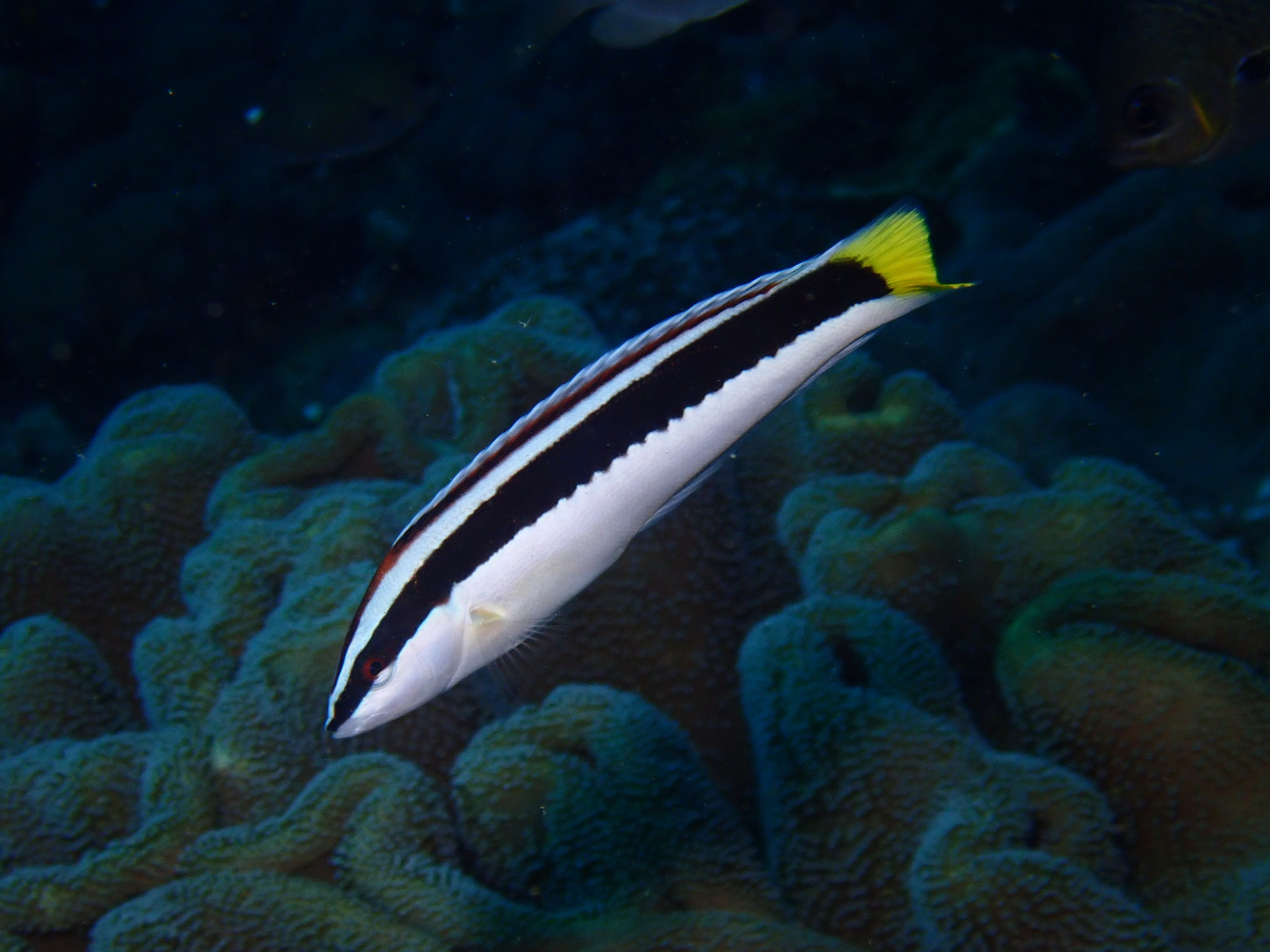
Adult

== Biology ==
Comb wrasses often act as cleaners and some get most of their food in this way. The contrasting colour pattern with its cleaning signal stripe acts as a strong attraction to many other reef fish, and they are often surrounded by groups of fishes waiting to be cleaned. The rest of their diet consists of small crustaceans.
