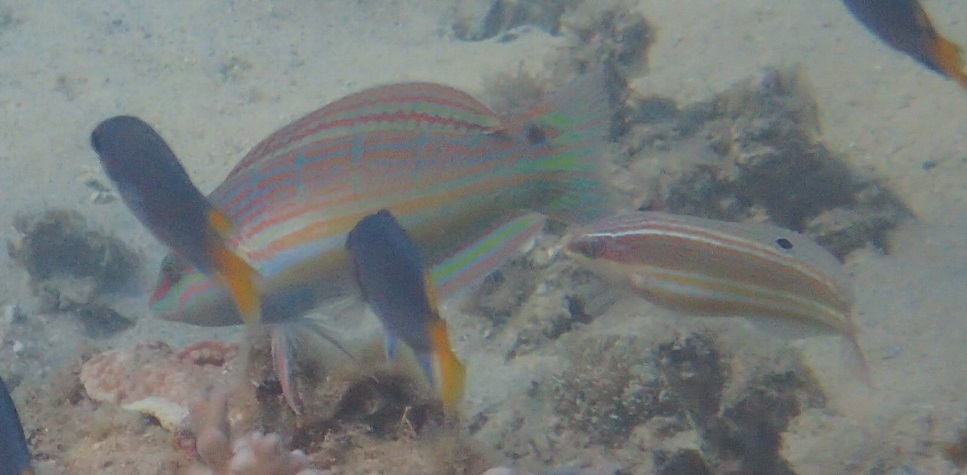

Conservation status
- Least Concern (IUCN 3.1)

Scientific classification
- Kingdom: Animalia
- Phylum: Chordata
- Class: Actinopterygii
- Order: Labriformes
- Family: Labridae
- Genus: Coris
- Species: C. aurilineata

Binomial name
- Coris aurilineata Randall & Kuiter, 1982

Synonyms
- Coris aurolineata

= Coris aurilineata =

Species of fish

Coris aurilineata, the gold-lined coris, is a species of ray-finned fish in the genus Coris. The scientific name of the species was first validly published in 1982 by Randall & Kuiter.
