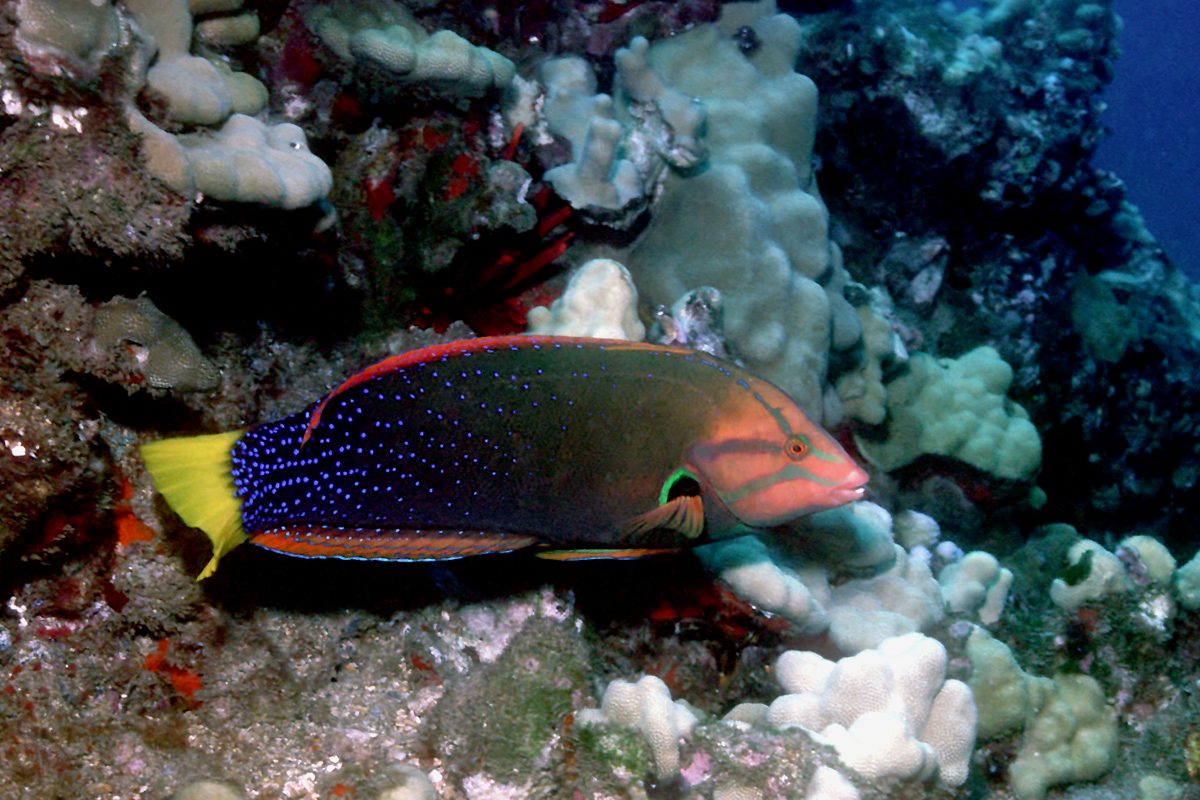
- Yellowtail coris (C. gaimard)

Scientific classification
- Kingdom: Animalia
- Phylum: Chordata
- Class: Actinopterygii
- Division: Teleostei
- Order: Labriformes
- Family: Labridae
- Subfamily: Corinae
- Genus: Coris; Lacépède, 1801

Type species
- Coris aygula Lacépède, 1801

Synonyms
- List: Allocoris Kuiter, 2010; Aygula Rafinesque, 1815; Corichoeres Kuiter, 2010; Ctenocorissa Whitley, 1931; Hemicoris Bleeker, 1862; Icthycallus Swainson, 1839; Julis Cuvier, 1814; Neanis Gistel, 1848; Paracoris Kuiter, 2010; Tiricoris Whitley, 1955

= Coris (fish) =

Genus of fishes

Coris is a genus of wrasses, collectively known as the rainbow wrasses, found in the Atlantic, Indian, and Pacific Oceans.

== Species ==
The 28 currently recognized species in this genus are:

| Species | Common name | Image |
|---|---|---|
| Coris atlantica Günther, 1862 | | |
| Coris auricularis (Valenciennes, 1839) | western king wrasse | |
| Coris aurilineata J. E. Randall & Kuiter, 1982 | gold-lined coris | |
| Coris aygula Lacépède, 1801 | clown coris | |
| Coris ballieui Vaillant & Sauvage, 1875 | | |
| Coris batuensis (Bleeker, 1856) | Batu coris | |
| Coris bulbifrons J. E. Randall & Kuiter, 1982 | doubleheader | |
| Coris caudimacula (Quoy & Gaimard, 1834) | spottail coris | |
| Coris centralis J. E. Randall, 1999 | | |
| Coris cuvieri (E. T. Bennett, 1831) | African coris | |
| Coris debueni J. E. Randall, 1999 | De Buen's coris | |
| Coris dorsomacula Fowler, 1908 | pale-barred coris | |
| Coris flavovittata (E. T. Bennett, 1828) | yellowstripe coris | |
| Coris flava Fricke & Durville, 2021 | yellow coris | |
| Coris formosa (J. W. Bennett, 1830) | queen coris | |
| Coris gaimard (Quoy & Gaimard, 1824) | yellowtail coris | |
| Coris hewetti J. E. Randall, 1999 | | |
| Coris julis (Linnaeus, 1758) | Mediterranean rainbow wrasse | |
| Coris latifasciata J. E. Randall, 2013 | | |
| Coris marquesensis J. E. Randall, 1999 | | |
| Coris melanura | | |
| Coris musume (D. S. Jordan & Snyder, 1904) | | |
| Coris nigrotaenia Mee & Hare, 1995 | blackbar coris | |
| Coris picta (Bloch & J. G. Schneider, 1801) | comb wrasse | |
| Coris pictoides J. E. Randall & Kuiter, 1982 | blackstripe coris | |
| Coris roseoviridis J. E. Randall, 1999 | | |
| Coris sandeyeri (Hector, 1884) | eastern king wrasse, Sandager's wrasse | |
| Coris variegata (Rüppell, 1835) | dapple coris | |
| Coris venusta Vaillant & Sauvage, 1875 | elegant coris | |
