= Coris marquesensis =

Conservation status
- Least Concern (IUCN 3.1)

Scientific classification
- Kingdom: Animalia
- Phylum: Chordata
- Class: Actinopterygii
- Order: Labriformes
- Family: Labridae
- Genus: Coris
- Species: C. marquesensis

Binomial name
- Coris marquesensis Randall, 1999

Species of fish

Coris marquesensis is a species of ray-finned fish. The scientific name of the species was first validly published in 1999 by Randall.
