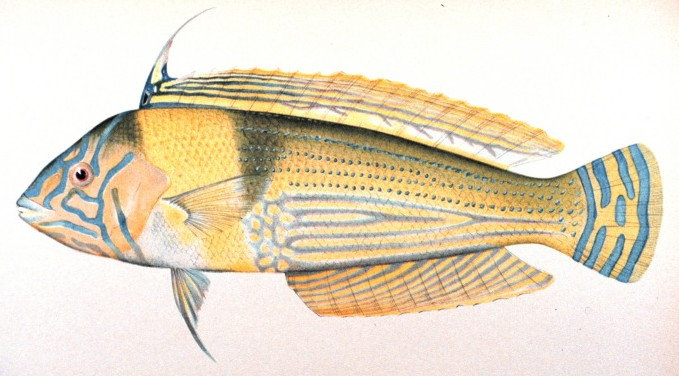

Conservation status
- Least Concern (IUCN 3.1)

Scientific classification
- Kingdom: Animalia
- Phylum: Chordata
- Class: Actinopterygii
- Order: Labriformes
- Family: Labridae
- Genus: Coris
- Species: C. ballieui

Binomial name
- Coris ballieui Vaillant & Sauvage, 1875

Synonyms
- Coris argenteostriata Steindachner, 1900; Coris rosea Vaillant & Sauvage, 1875; Coris schauinslandii Steindachner, 1900; Hemicoris keleipionis Jenkins, 1901

= Coris ballieui =

Species of fish

Coris ballieui is a species of ray-finned fish in the genus Coris. The scientific name of the species was first validly published in 1875 by Vaillant & Sauvage.
