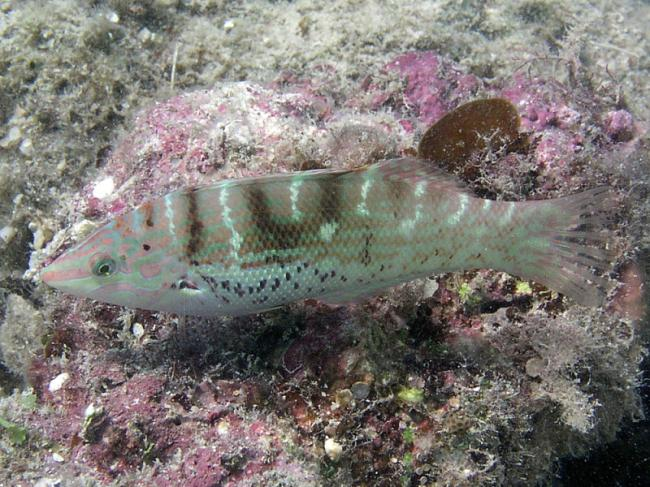

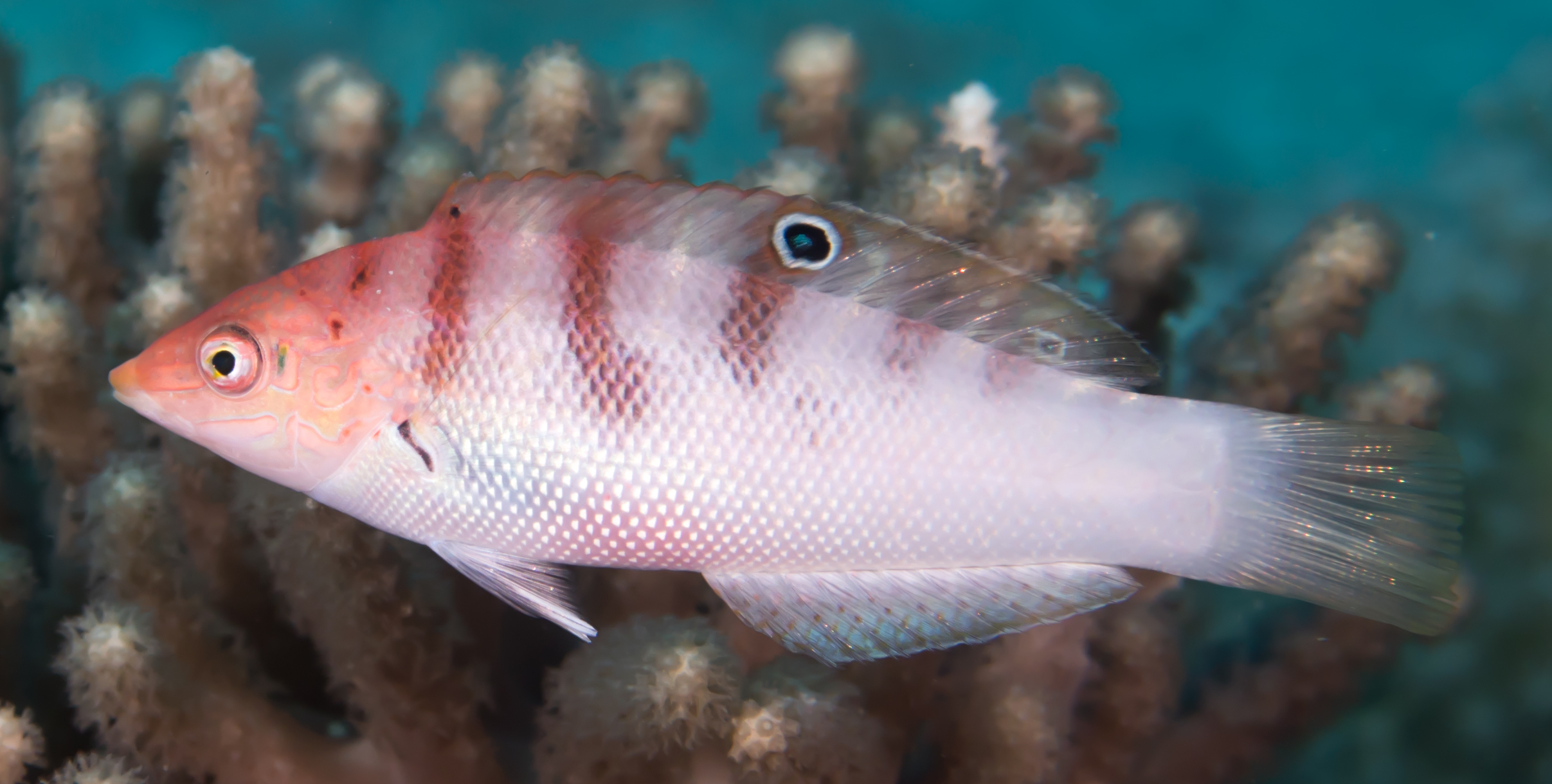
- Adult (top) and juvenile (bottom)

Conservation status
- Least Concern (IUCN 3.1)

Scientific classification
- Kingdom: Animalia
- Phylum: Chordata
- Class: Actinopterygii
- Order: Labriformes
- Family: Labridae
- Genus: Coris
- Species: C. batuensis

Binomial name
- Coris batuensis (Bleeker, 1856)

Synonyms
- Julis batuensis Bleeker, 1856; Hemicoris batuensis (Bleeker, 1856); Julis schroederii Bleeker, 1858; Coris schroederi (Bleeker, 1858); Coris pallida Macleay, 1881; Coris papuensis Macleay, 1883; Coris coronata De Vis, 1885; Platyglossus punctatus De Vis, 1885

= Coris batuensis =

Species of fish

Coris batuensis, the Batu coris, also known as the Batu rainbow-wrasse, the variegated wrasse, the dapple coris, pallid wrasse, Schroeder's coris, Schroeder's rainbow wrasse, variegated rainbowfish or yellow wrasse, is a species of wrasse native to the Indian Ocean and the western Pacific Ocean from the African coast to the Marshall Islands and from southern Japan to Australia's Great Barrier Reef and Tonga. This species is an inhabitant of coral reefs and surrounding areas at depths from 2 to 30 m (6.6 to 98.4 ft), though it is rarer deeper than 15 m (49 ft). It can reach 17 cm (6.7 in) in total length. It is of minor importance to local commercial fisheries and can also be found in the aquarium trade.
