= Coris nigrotaenia =

Conservation status
- Data Deficient (IUCN 3.1)

Scientific classification
- Domain: Eukaryota
- Kingdom: Animalia
- Phylum: Chordata
- Class: Actinopterygii
- Order: Labriformes
- Family: Labridae
- Genus: Coris
- Species: C. nigrotaenia

Binomial name
- Coris nigrotaenia Mee & Hare, 1995

Species of fish

Coris nigrotaenia, the blackbar coris, is a species of ray-finned fish. The scientific name of the species was first validly published in 1995 by Mee & Hare.
