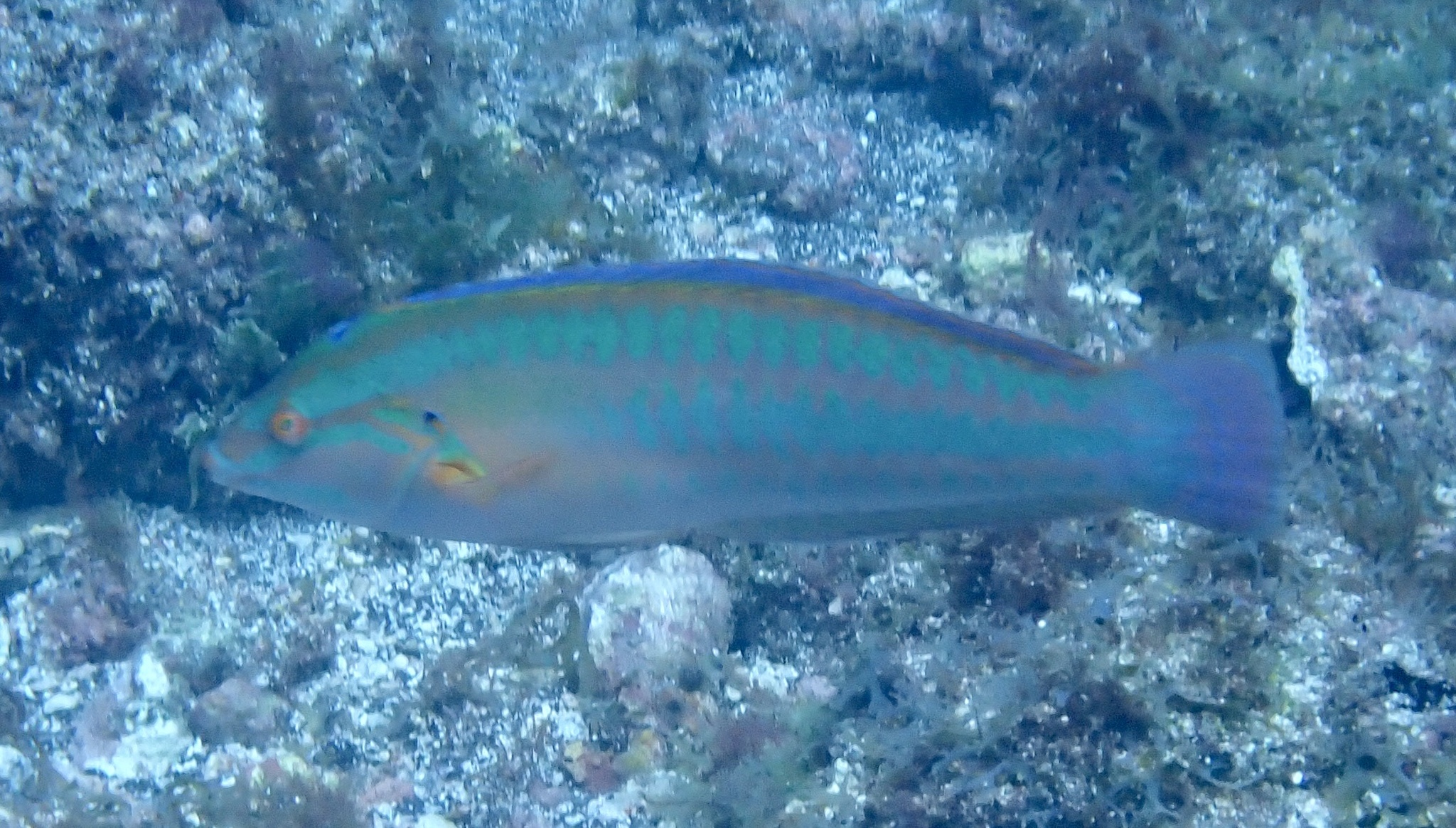

Conservation status
- Least Concern (IUCN 3.1)

Scientific classification
- Kingdom: Animalia
- Phylum: Chordata
- Class: Actinopterygii
- Division: Teleostei
- Order: Labriformes
- Family: Labridae
- Genus: Coris
- Species: C. atlantica

Binomial name
- Coris atlantica Günther, 1862

Synonyms
- Coris guineensis Bleeker, 1863; Coris hupferi Fischer, 1885

= Coris atlantica =

Species of fish

Coris atlantica is a species of ray-finned fish in the family Labridae. The scientific name of the species was first validly published in 1862 by Günther.
