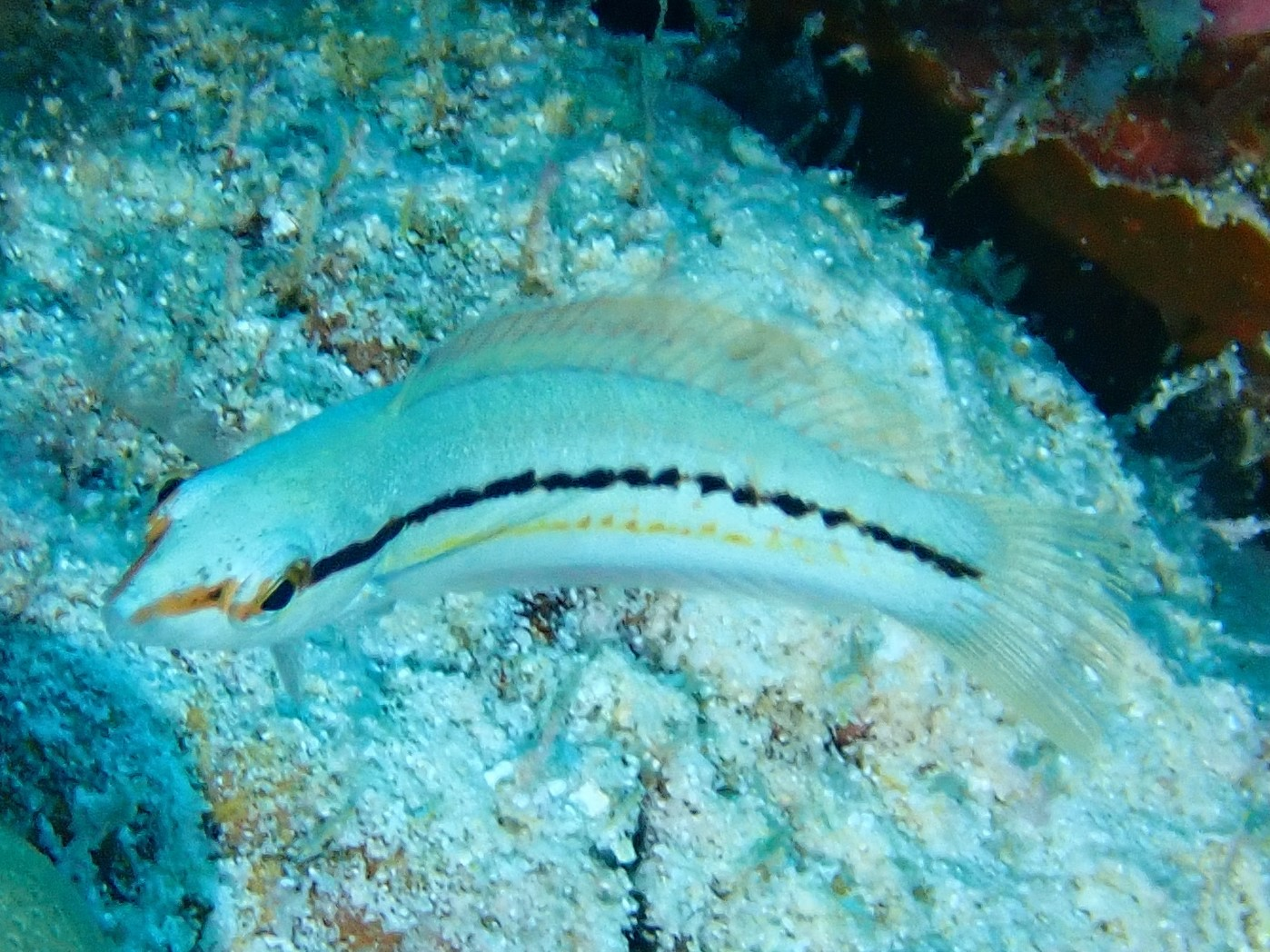

Conservation status
- Least Concern (IUCN 3.1)

Scientific classification
- Kingdom: Animalia
- Phylum: Chordata
- Class: Actinopterygii
- Order: Labriformes
- Family: Labridae
- Genus: Coris
- Species: C. centralis

Binomial name
- Coris centralis Randall, 1999

= Coris centralis =

Species of fish

Coris centralis is a species of wrasse that is endemic to Kiribati. The species was first described in 1999 by John Ernest Randall.
