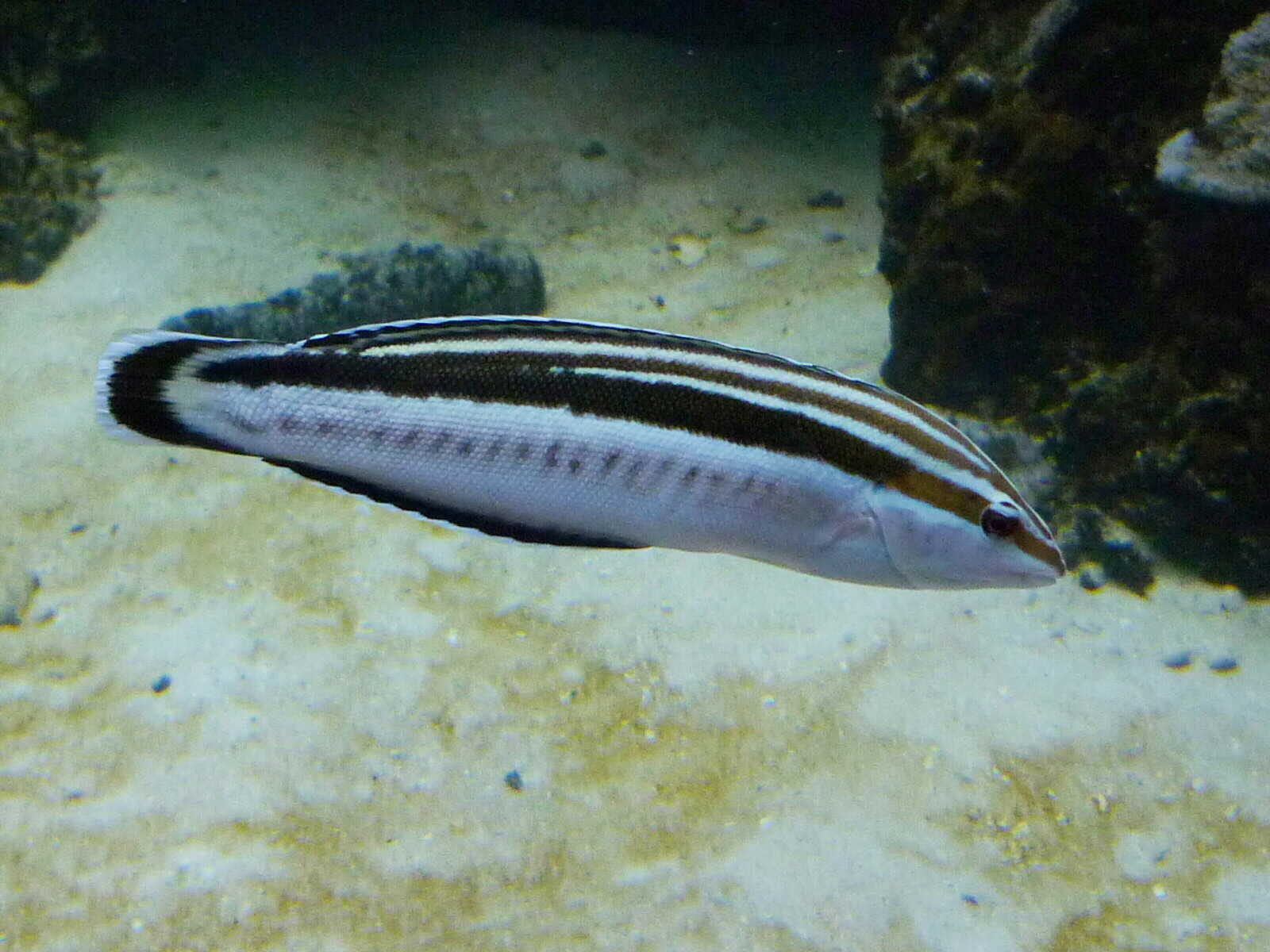

Conservation status
- Least Concern (IUCN 3.1)

Scientific classification
- Kingdom: Animalia
- Phylum: Chordata
- Class: Actinopterygii
- Order: Labriformes
- Family: Labridae
- Genus: Coris
- Species: C. flavovittata

Binomial name
- Coris flavovittata Bennett, 1828

Synonyms
- Coris eydouxii (Valenciennes, 1839); Coris lepomis Jenkins, 1901; Julis eydouxii Valenciennes, 1839; Julis flavovittatus Bennett, 1828

= Coris flavovittata =

Species of fish

Coris flavovittata, the yellowstripe coris, is a species of ray-finned fish . The scientific name of the species was first validly published in 1828 by Edward Turner Bennett.
