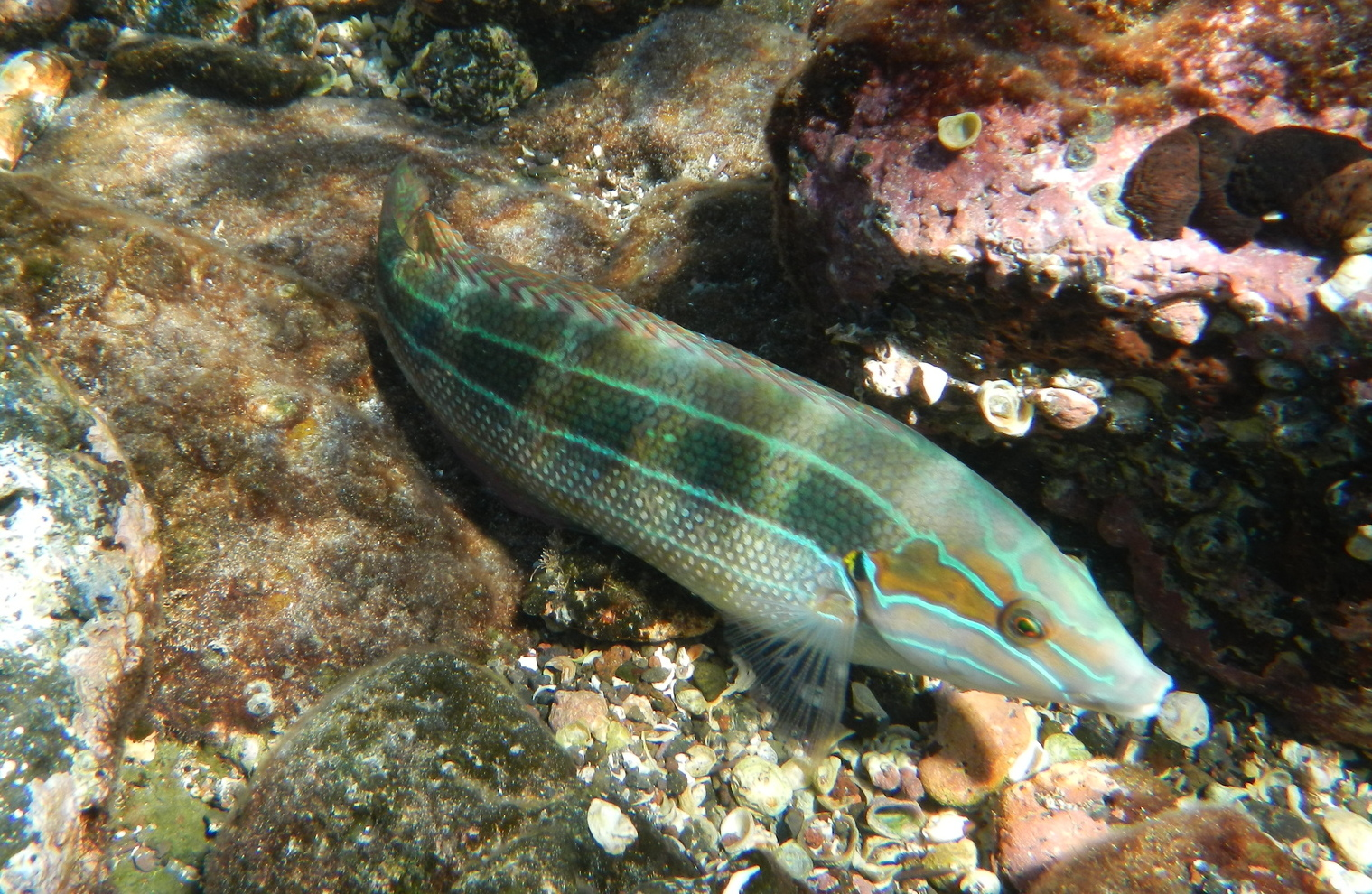

Conservation status
- Least Concern (IUCN 3.1)

Scientific classification
- Kingdom: Animalia
- Phylum: Chordata
- Class: Actinopterygii
- Order: Labriformes
- Family: Labridae
- Genus: Coris
- Species: C. debueni

Binomial name
- Coris debueni Randall, 1999

= Coris debueni =

Species of fish

Coris debueni, the De Buen's coris, is a species of wrasse in the genus Coris. The scientific name of the species was first validly published in 1999 by John Ernest Randall.
