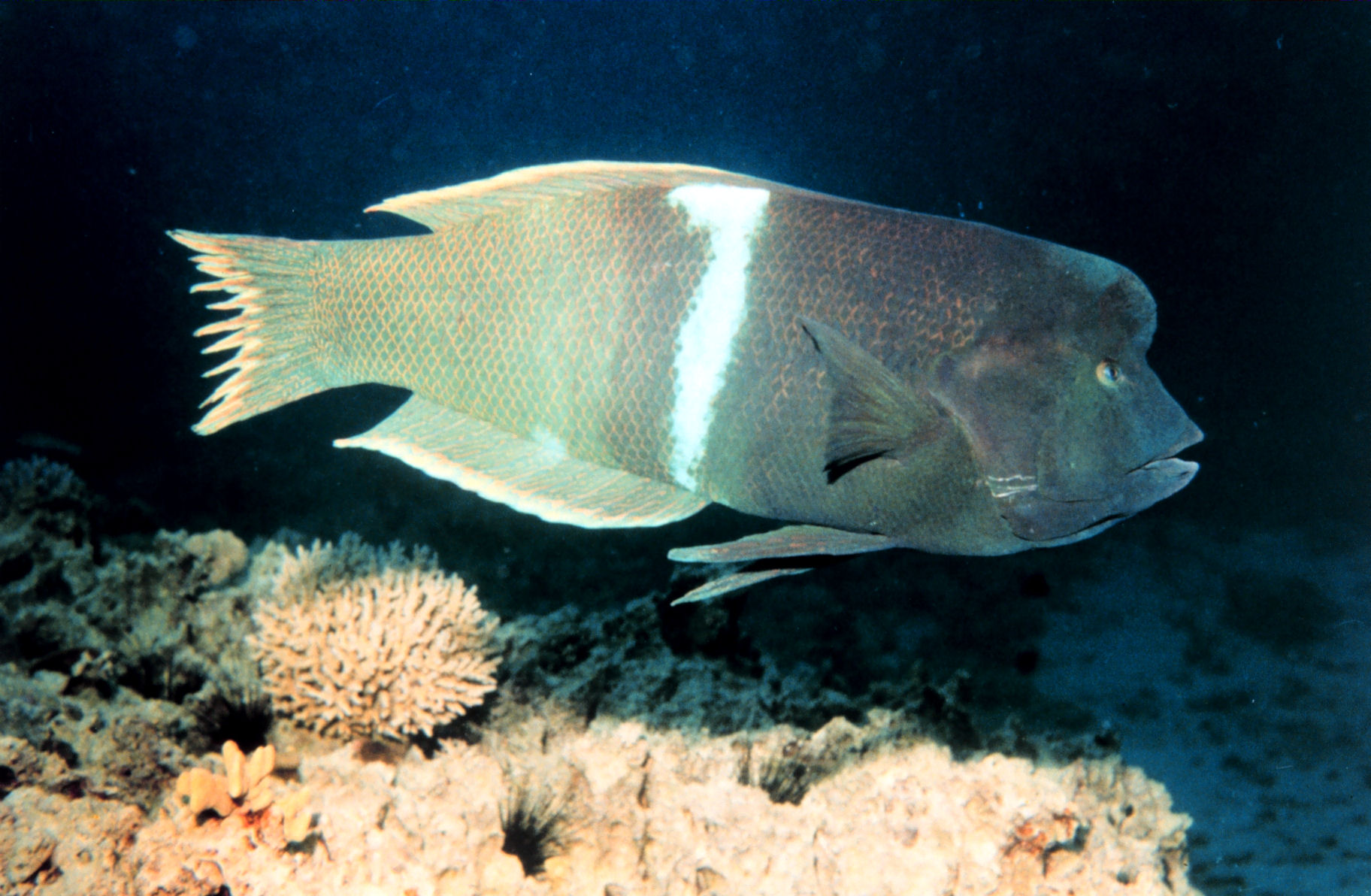
- Male (terminal phase)

Conservation status
- Least Concern (IUCN 3.1)

Scientific classification
- Kingdom: Animalia
- Phylum: Chordata
- Class: Actinopterygii
- Division: Teleostei
- Order: Labriformes
- Family: Labridae
- Genus: Coris
- Species: C. aygula

Binomial name
- Coris aygula Lacépède, 1801

Synonyms
- List: Coris angulata Lacépède, 1801; Labrus cingulum Lacépède, 1801; Hemicoris cingulum (Lacépède, 1801); Julis cingulum (Lacépède, 1801); Labrus aureomaculatus J.W. Bennett, 1830; Julis ruppelii E. T. Bennett, 1831; Julis gibbifrons Quoy & Gaimard, 1834; Julis semipunctatus Rüppell, 1835; Julis coris Valenciennes, 1839; Coris cyanea Macleay, 1883; Coris variegata Ramsay & Ogilby, 1887; Coris imbris Tanaka, 1918

= Clown coris =

Species of fish

The clown coris (Coris aygula), also known as the clown wrasse, false clownwrasse, humphead wrasse, hump-headed wrasse, red-blotched rainbowfish or twinspot wrasse, is a species of wrasse native to the Indian Ocean and the western Pacific Ocean.

== Distribution ==
In the Indian Ocean, C. aygula can be found from the Red Sea and the African coast eastward to the Line Islands and Ducie Island of the Pacific Ocean. Its Pacific range also extends to southern Japan to Lord Howe Island.

== Description ==
This species can reach a total length of 120 cm (47 in). A marked difference in appearance and coloration is noted between juveniles and adults: juveniles are white and orange with false eyes on the dorsal fin, while adults are uniformly dark green or with light banding. Adults also develop a prominent, projecting forehead.

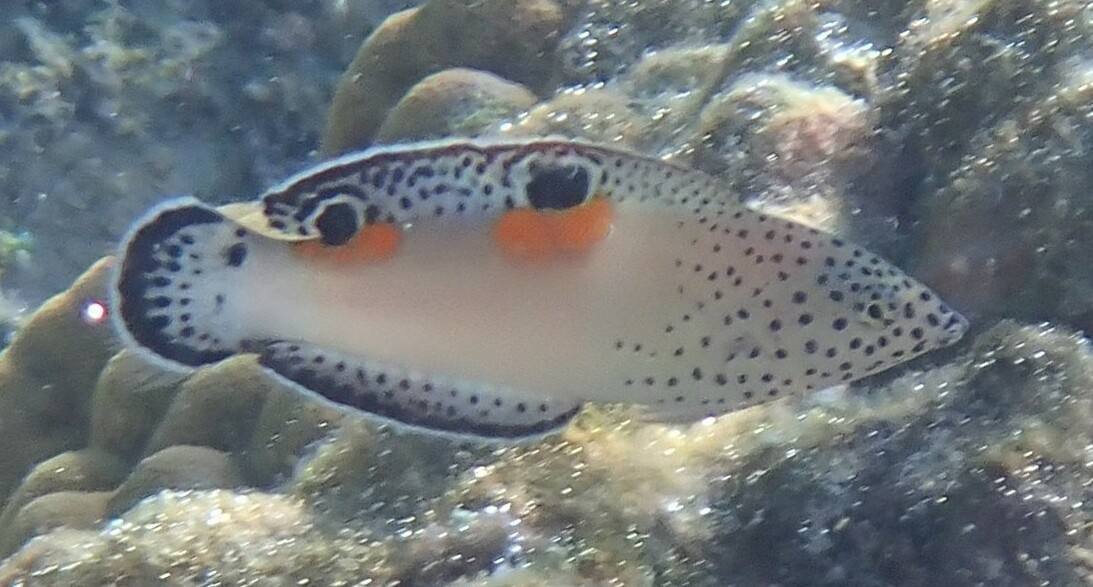
Juvenile

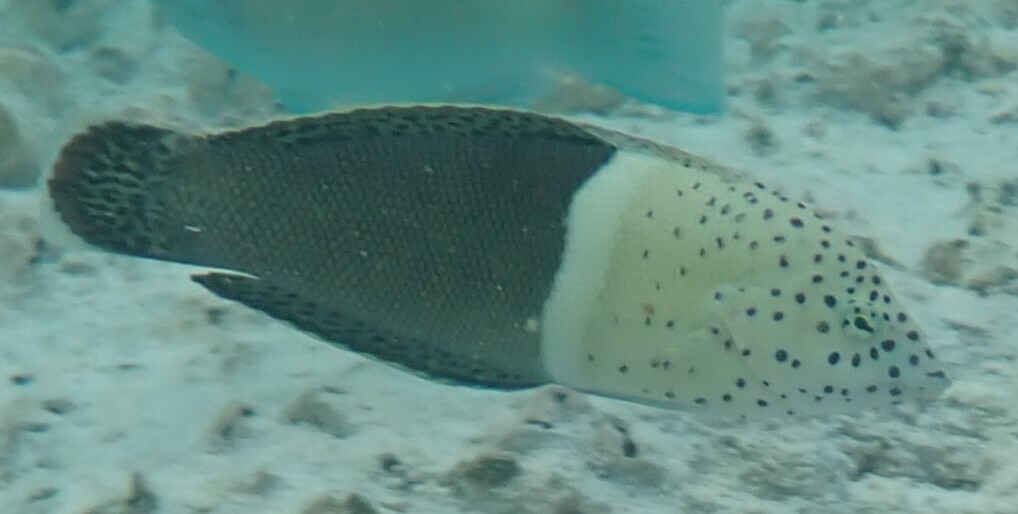
Female

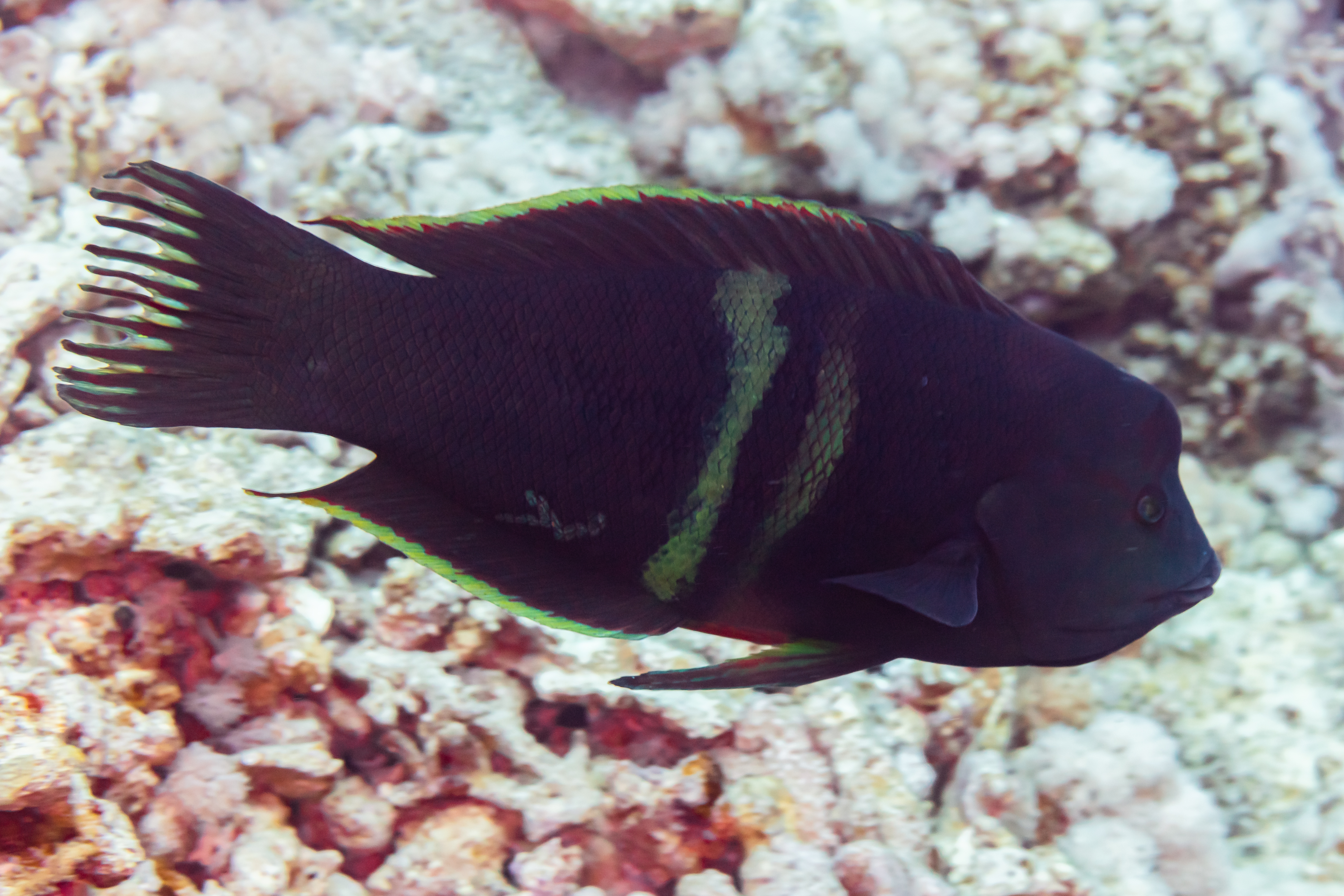
Male (terminal phase)

== Habitat ==
C. aygula is an inhabitant of coral reefs where they prefer areas of rubble or sandy bottoms at depths from 2 to 30 m (6.6 to 98.4 ft), though juveniles can often be found in tide pools. They are generally solitary as adults.

== Ecology ==
Studies at Ningaloo Reef in Western Australia show that clown coris are important predators of the burrowing urchin, which the fish feed upon by crushing the urchin in their jaws. In the Red Sea, however, clown coris have been observed preying on long-spined Diadema urchins by picking them up and bashing them apart against large rocks, rather than using their jaws outright.

== Gallery ==
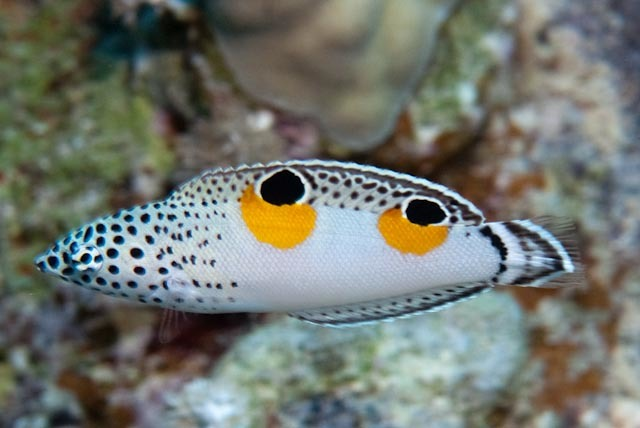
Juvenile

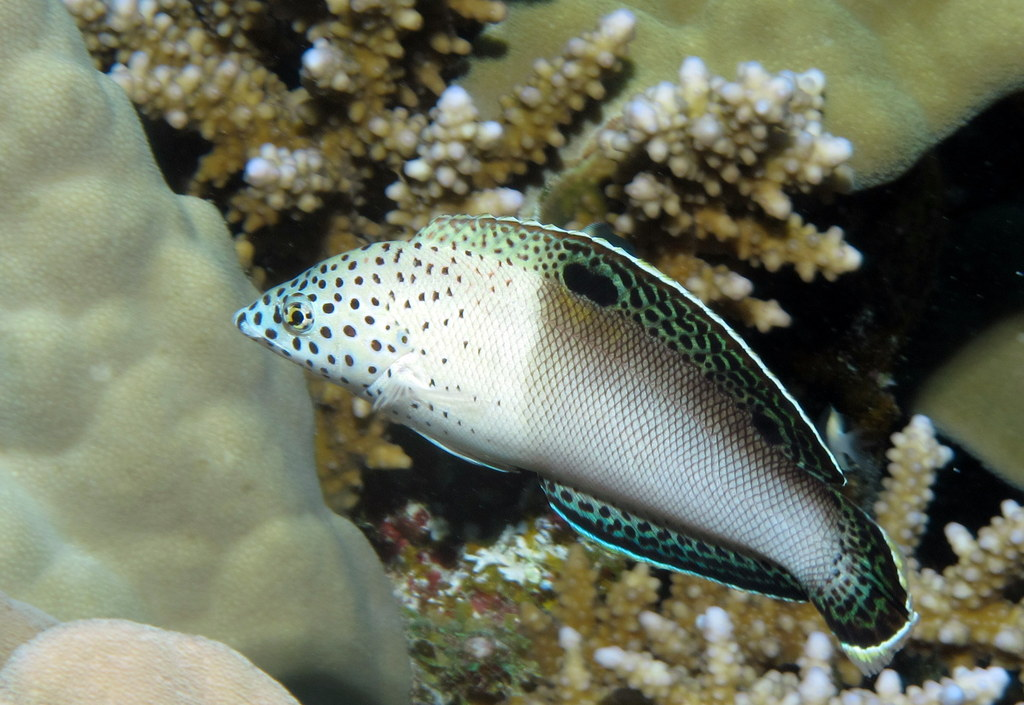
Transitioning from juvenile to adult female colours

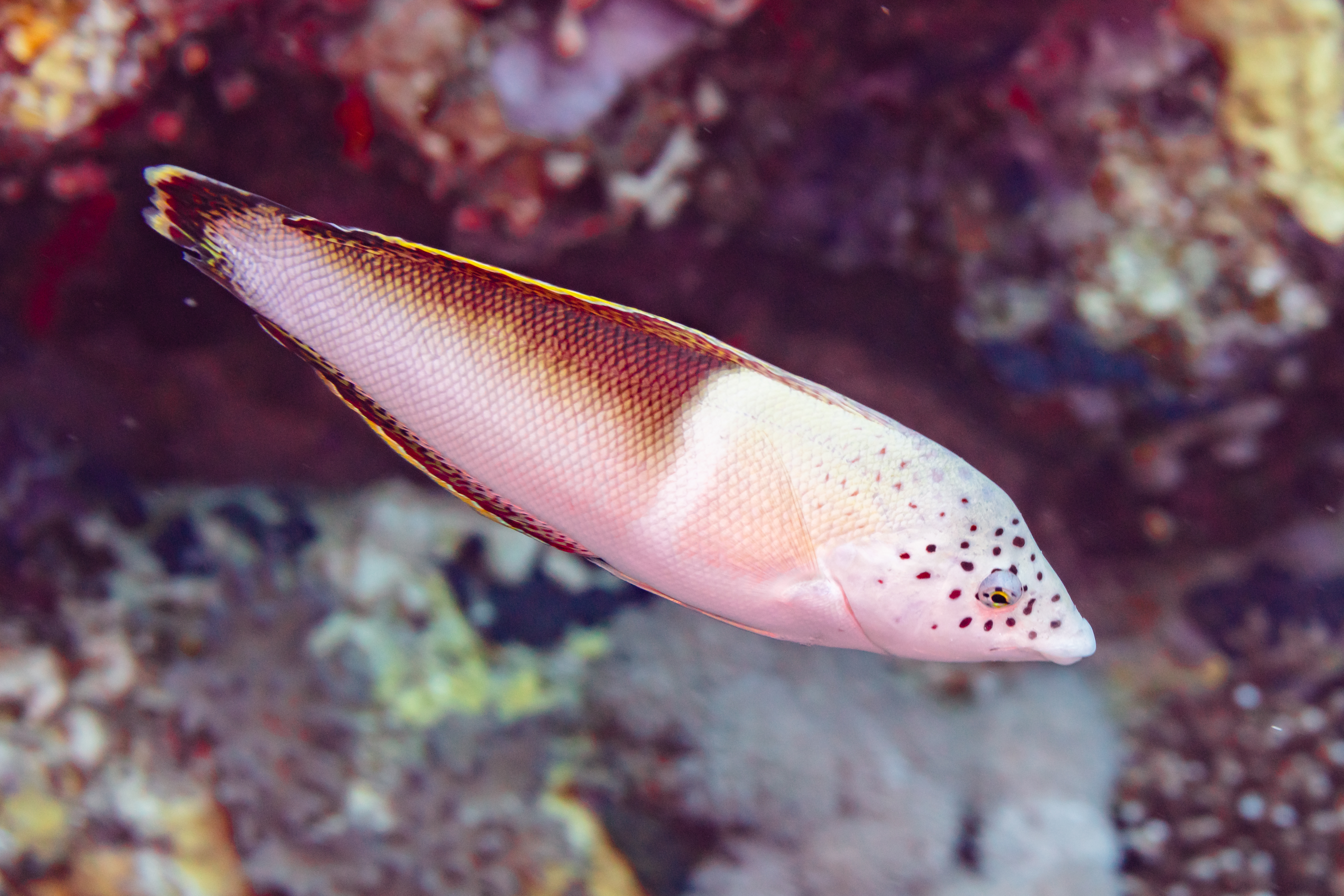
Female

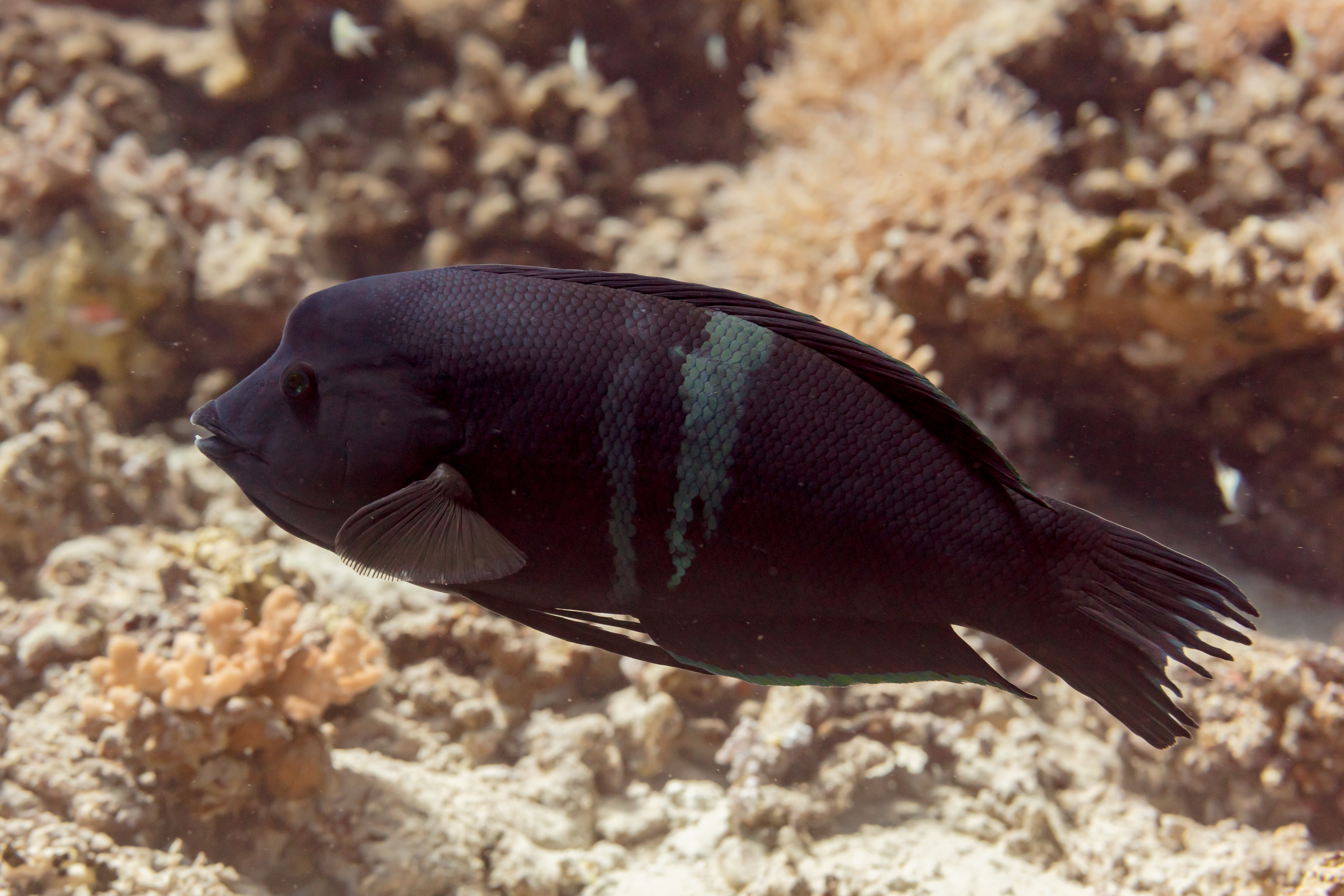
Male
