= Duperrey =

Duperrey may refer to:

== People ==
- Louis Isidore Duperrey (1786–1865), a French sailor and explorer.

== Island ==
- Duperrey Island, also known as Mokil Atoll.

== Fish ==
- Thalassoma duperrey, also known as saddle wrasse.

== Drink ==
- Champagne Duperrey, a champagne produced by G.H. Martel & Cie in Avenay-Val-d'Or.
