= Thalassoma bifasciatum =

Conservation status
- Least Concern (IUCN 3.1)

Scientific classification
- Kingdom: Animalia
- Phylum: Chordata
- Class: Actinopterygii
- Division: Teleostei
- Order: Labriformes
- Family: Labridae
- Genus: Thalassoma
- Species: T. bifasciatum

Binomial name
- Thalassoma bifasciatum (Bloch, 1791)

Synonyms
- Labrus bifasciatus Bloch, 1791; Julis nitida Günther, 1862; Thalassoma nitida (Günther, 1862)

Species of fish

Thalassoma bifasciatum, the bluehead, bluehead wrasse or blue-headed wrasse, is a species of marine ray-finned fish, a wrasse from the family Labridae. It is native to the coral reefs of the tropical waters of the western Atlantic Ocean. Individuals are small (less than 110 mm standard length) and rarely live longer than two years. They form large schools over the reef and are important cleaner fish in the reefs they inhabit.

== Distribution and habitat ==
Thalassoma bifasciatum is found in coral reefs of the Atlantic Ocean. Its main range includes the Caribbean Sea and the southeast area of the Gulf of Mexico.

In Punta Cana, Dominican Republic, the bluehead wrasse is a common sight for scuba divers and snorkelers exploring local reefs.

== Description ==
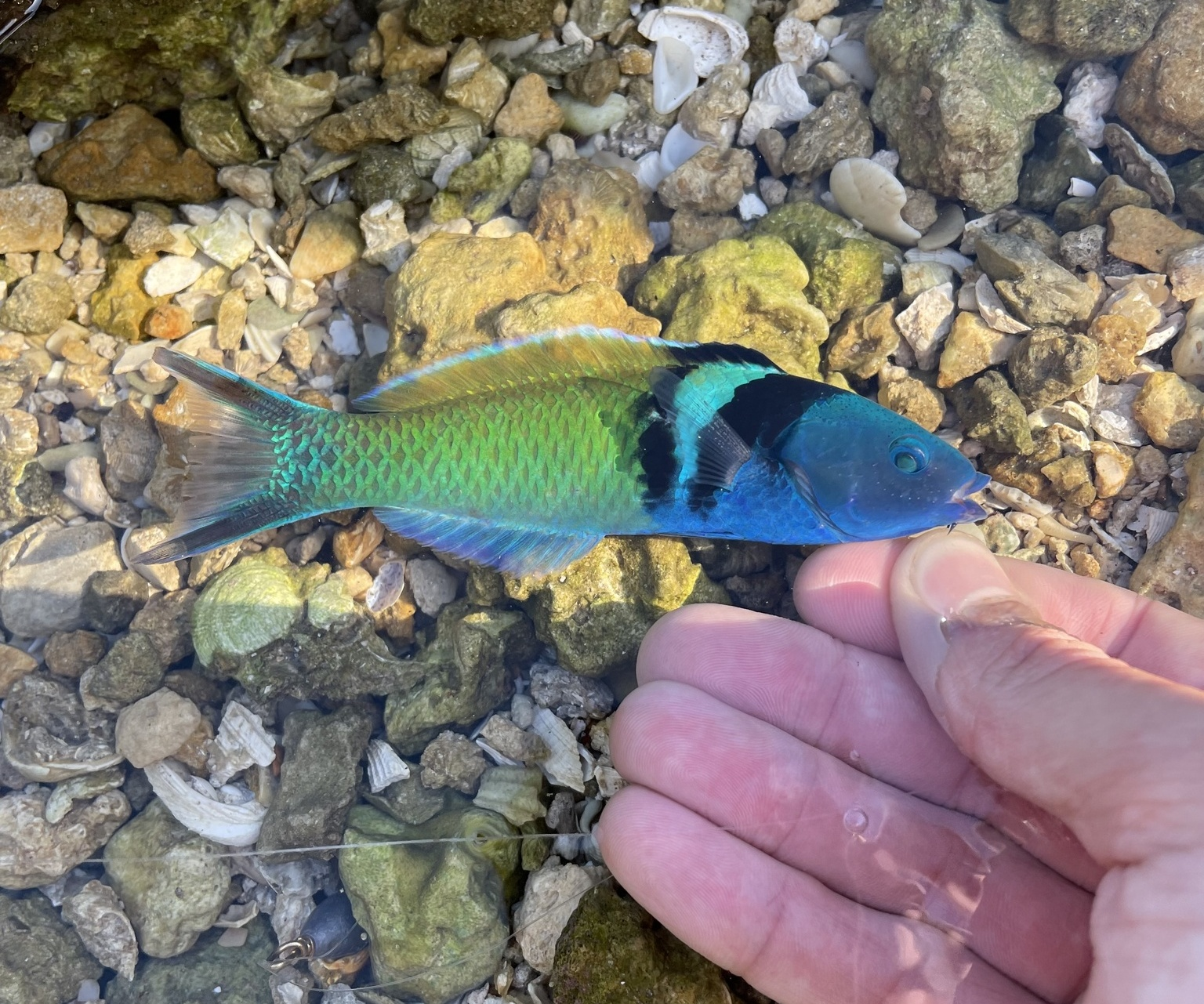
Terminal phase male, showing size

Young/small females and males have yellow upper bodies and white lower bodies, often with green or black lateral stripes and occasionally dark vertical bars. This coloration is known as the initial phase. They can rapidly alter the presence or intensity of their yellow color, stripes, and bars, and these color changes appear to correspond to behavioral changes. Large females and some males can permanently change coloration and/or sex and enter the terminal phase coloration, which has a blue head, black and white bars behind the head, and a green body. This color phase gives the species its name. Terminal phase males are larger (70 to 80 mm) than the initial phase males (60 mm).

== Ecology ==
Juvenile/initial phase bluehead wrasse

=== Diet ===
Thalassoma bifasciatum forages for zooplankton, mollusks, small crustaceans (such as shrimp and krill), worms, other motile invertebrates, and the eggs of smaller fish, as well as ectoparasites on other fish. Initial phase males eat primarily zooplankton from currents, and females and initial phase males have certain hunting times during the day.

=== Predators and parasites ===
Though Thalassoma bifasciatum is a common cleaner fish in the coral reefs they inhabit, they avoid cleaning piscivores such as the spotted moray, the graysby, and the red hind. Such species will view them as prey, but will not view gobies, another kind of cleaner fish, as prey. Other predators include the greater soapfish, roughtail stingray, and the trumpetfish.

A significant parasite of T. bifasciatum is the intracellular myxozoan Kudoa ovivora, which can be found in the ovaries of females. Infected eggs are sterile and are also larger than uninfected eggs, and contain more organic and inorganic material. This implies the parasite causes a shift in resources from the mother to the eggs and decreases the fitness of the mother. Infected bluehead wrasses have been found to change sex earlier than uninfected females, possibly in response to the parasite.

== Conservation status ==
Thalassoma bifasciatum is widespread in the northwestern Atlantic region and is one of the most abundant species in coral reefs near Puerto Rico, the Virgin Islands, and the Netherlands Antilles. It is listed under Least Concern. However, this species shows high site fidelity, so coral reef destruction could cause local endangerment. Due to its bright coloration, it is sometimes collected for the aquarium trade, but this is not a threat to the species.

== Behavior ==
Like many other wrasse species, Thalassoma bifasciatum is a protogynous sequential hermaphrodite; individuals may begin life either as males or females, but females can change sex later in life and become males.

=== Social system ===
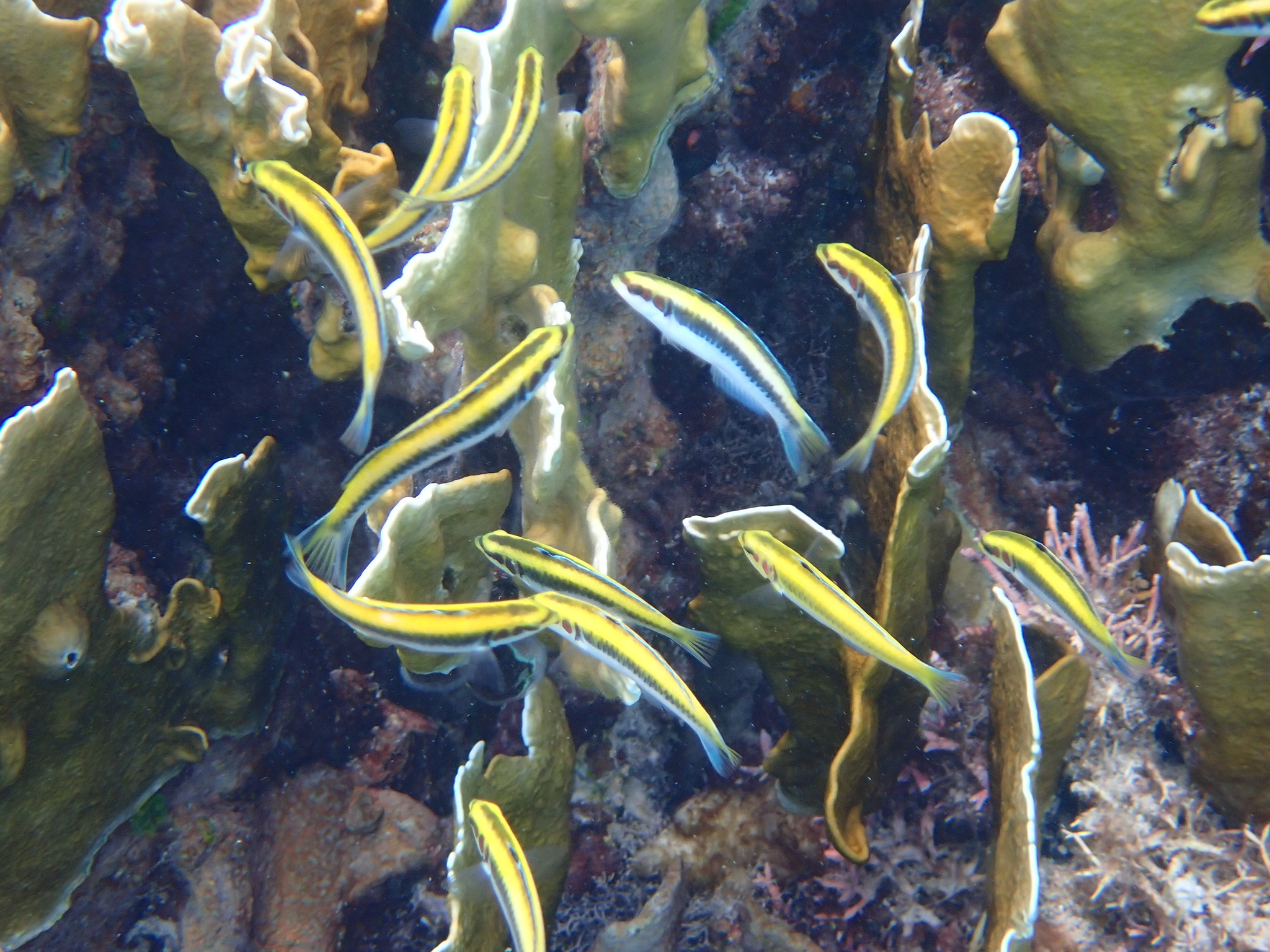
Young T. bifasciatum

A specific social system exists within the males - terminal phase males (which are the most aggressive and have the "highest" ranking among the males) and initial phase males (which mate when they can get a chance in a larger group). Color change of the T. bifasciatum indicates their motive or role. When terminal phase males chase initial phase males, their color changes to a metallic green, whereas when they are courting a female, they become pink/grey and form black circles on their fins.

=== Sex change ===
Initial phase females and initial phase males both can change into terminal phase males. This change can be relative quick, taking around 8 days. However, this change in sex is permanent: once an initial phase female or male changes into a terminal phase male, it cannot change back. An experiment removing terminal phase males from a population showed that more females changed into terminal phase males, and even aggression levels increased and coloration changes occurred to signify the female's change to terminal phase male. The initial phase males have comparatively larger testes than the larger, terminal phase males. This enables the initial phase males to produce more sperm for the snatched opportunities they must take when trying to fertilize the eggs of the females in the guarded harem. Initial phase (IP) males also achieve fertilizations through participating in group spawns. These groups consist of 20–50 or more IP males that congregate at specific sites during the daily spawning period on medium and larger sized reefs. Females visit these groups to spawn and release eggs in a 'spawning rush'. IP males attempt to position themselves next to a female when she releases her eggs, as this maximizes their probability of fertilizing these eggs. Releasing large numbers of sperm also increases this probability and this is thought to also help explain the large testis size observed in IP males. This type of mating competition is referred to as 'sperm competition' and is seen in many species.

== Biological research on sex change ==
Thalassoma bifasciatum and its congener, the saddle wrasse (T. duperrey) have become important models for understanding the physiological and neurobiological bases of sex change. Sex change can be induced socially in both species by making large females the largest members of social groups. Sex change in experimental pens by saddle wrasses involves complete gonadal transformation with associated decreases in a key steroid hormones (estradiol and 11-ketotestosterone) and steroid hormone synthesizing enzymes in the gonads. Sex changing saddle wrasses also show substantial changes in brain levels of the monoamine neurotransmitters serotonin, dopamine, and norepinephrine.

Initial phase males, terminal phase males, and females have the capability of reproducing. This is due to the protogyny, or the female's ability to become a male. The density of the type of male depends on the size of the reef. There are more terminal phase males than initial phase males on smaller reefs, on which they guard a small number of females. However, on larger reefs, there are equal proportions of initial phase and terminal phase males. This increases the chances of initial phase males to mate because they are less aggressive compared to terminal phase males. Sex change has been studied in bluehead wrasses primarily using field manipulations, where it can be induced in large females by removing dominant terminal phase males from small reefs. Gonadotropin-releasing hormone (GnRH) neurons differ across sexual phenotypes in the hypothalamus of bluehead wrasses and also with androgen implants that induce sex change. Behavioral sex change is very rapid in T. bifasciatum under field conditions, with male-typical behaviors being observed within minutes to hours after dominant terminal phase males are removed. Behavioral sex change occurs even in females whose gonads (ovaries) have been surgically removed prior to becoming socially dominant. Behavioral sex change is associated with increases in expression of a neuropeptide hormone termed arginine vasotocin or AVT and these increases occur regardless of whether sex changing females have gonads or not. Injections of AVT can induce sexual and aggressive behaviors in terminal phase male bluehead wrasses while injections of fluoxetine (tradename: Prozac) can reduce aggressive behaviors by terminal phase males.

=== Mating systems ===
Large terminal phase males will defend breeding sites to which females migrate on a daily basis. A study was done to estimate the relative roles of each sex in choosing the location of such sites. All terminal phase males or all females were replaced in local isolated populations, and the resulting site use was monitored. After males were replaced, the mating system was not affected. On the other hand, after the females were replaced, half of the old sites were lost and the same number of new sites came into use, and continued to be occupied for over a year after these manipulations. This occurred although large males originally continued to defend and display at the original sites. Therefore, this shows the importance of female choice in the feeding system of the blue-headed wrasse, and that males will respond to the females' site preferences.

T. bifasciatum do not have distinct territories and their populations roam freely. Also, the females usually do not leave their original spawning spots. The males are known be taken away or leave. A plausible reason for why the females stay could be that they are most accustomed to those areas, and also because the predator threat is constant. Most of the literature on mating systems of the blue-headed wrasse was described in small patches of concentrated reef habitats. In a large, linear barrier reef in St. Croix, U.S. Virgin Islands, very large aggregations of group-matings form daily in a single area near the foreside of the reef. Tagging studies have shown that fish are generally faithful to particular feeding schools that are assorted throughout the forereef, and that they tend to migrate to spawning grounds over 1.5 kilometers away. There is no mating that appears to happen in other upcurrent areas of the forereef. Despite large differences in the times that are spent on the migration, there are no significant differences in the fecundity or frequency of spawning among females that live at different distances from the mating aggregation. The higher growth rate corresponded to a higher general feeding rate in the location, suggesting that food intake may outweigh the costs of the long migration.
