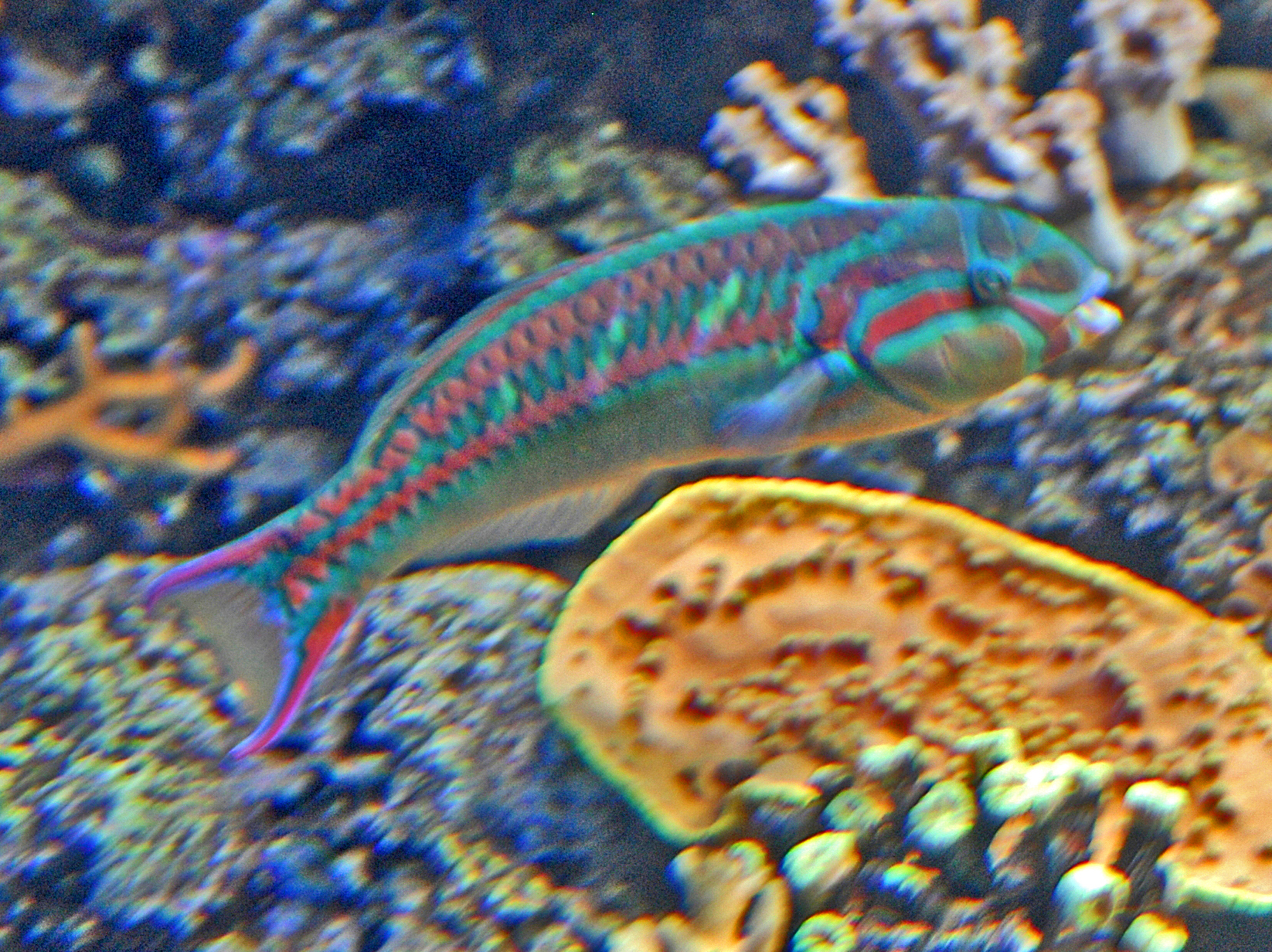
- Thalassoma quinquevittatum. Normal coloration

Conservation status
- Least Concern (IUCN 3.1)

Scientific classification
- Kingdom: Animalia
- Phylum: Chordata
- Class: Actinopterygii
- Order: Labriformes
- Family: Labridae
- Genus: Thalassoma
- Species: T. quinquevittatum

Binomial name
- Thalassoma quinquevittatum (Lay & E. T. Bennett, 1839)

Synonyms
- Scarus quinquevittatus Lay & E. T. Bennett, 1839

= Fivestripe wrasse =

Species of fish

The fivestripe wrasse (Thalassoma quinquevittatum), also known as the red-ribbon wrasse, is a species of marine ray-finned fish, a wrasse, from the family Labridae. It is found in the Indo-Pacific region.

== Etymology ==
The genus name derives from the Greek thalassa meaning sea and soma meaning body. The Latin species name quinquevittatum means "five stripes".

== Description ==
Thalassoma quinquevittatum can reach 17 cm (6.7 in) in total length. These colorful reef fishes have a complex and quite variable color pattern. The basic color of the body is green with longitudinal red or purple stripes, while the head shows various curved purplish lines and spots. Males change their color during courtship and while they defend their territory. These fishes sometimes interbreed with Thalassoma duperrey. The fivestripe wrasse can be found in the aquarium trade.

== Distribution ==
This species is native to the Indian Ocean and the western Pacific Ocean.

== Habitat ==
The fivestripe wrasse is an inhabitant of coral reefs in quite shallow water of 1 to 5 m (3.3 to 16.4 ft) in depth. It seems to particularly like areas with surge channels, plentiful algal growth, and Acropora coral plates.

== Bibliography ==
- Eschmeyer, William N., ed. 1998. Catalog of Fishes. Special Publication of the Center for Biodiversity Research and Information, n. 1, vol. 1–3. California Academy of Sciences. San Francisco, California, United States. 2905. ISBN 0-940228-47-5.
- Fenner, Robert M.: The Conscientious Marine Aquarist. Neptune City, New Jersey, : T.F.H. Publications, 2001.
- Helfman, G., B. Collette y D. Facey: The diversity of fishes. Blackwell Science, Malden, Massachusetts, 1997.
- Hoese, D.F. 1986: . A M.M. Smith y P.C. Heemstra (eds.) Smiths' sea fishes. Springer-Verlag, Berlín
- Maugé, L.A. 1986. A J. Daget, J.-P. Gosse y D.F.E. Thys van den Audenaerde (eds.) Check-list of the freshwater fishes of Africa (CLOFFA).
- Moyle, P. y J. Cech.: Fishes: An Introduction to Ichthyology, 4th. Ed., Upper Saddle River, New Jersey, United States: Prentice-Hall.
- Nelson, J.: Fishes of the World, 3rd. ed. New York: John Wiley and Sons. 1994.
- Wheeler, A.: The World Encyclopedia of Fishes, 2nd. Ed, London: Macdonald. year 1985.
