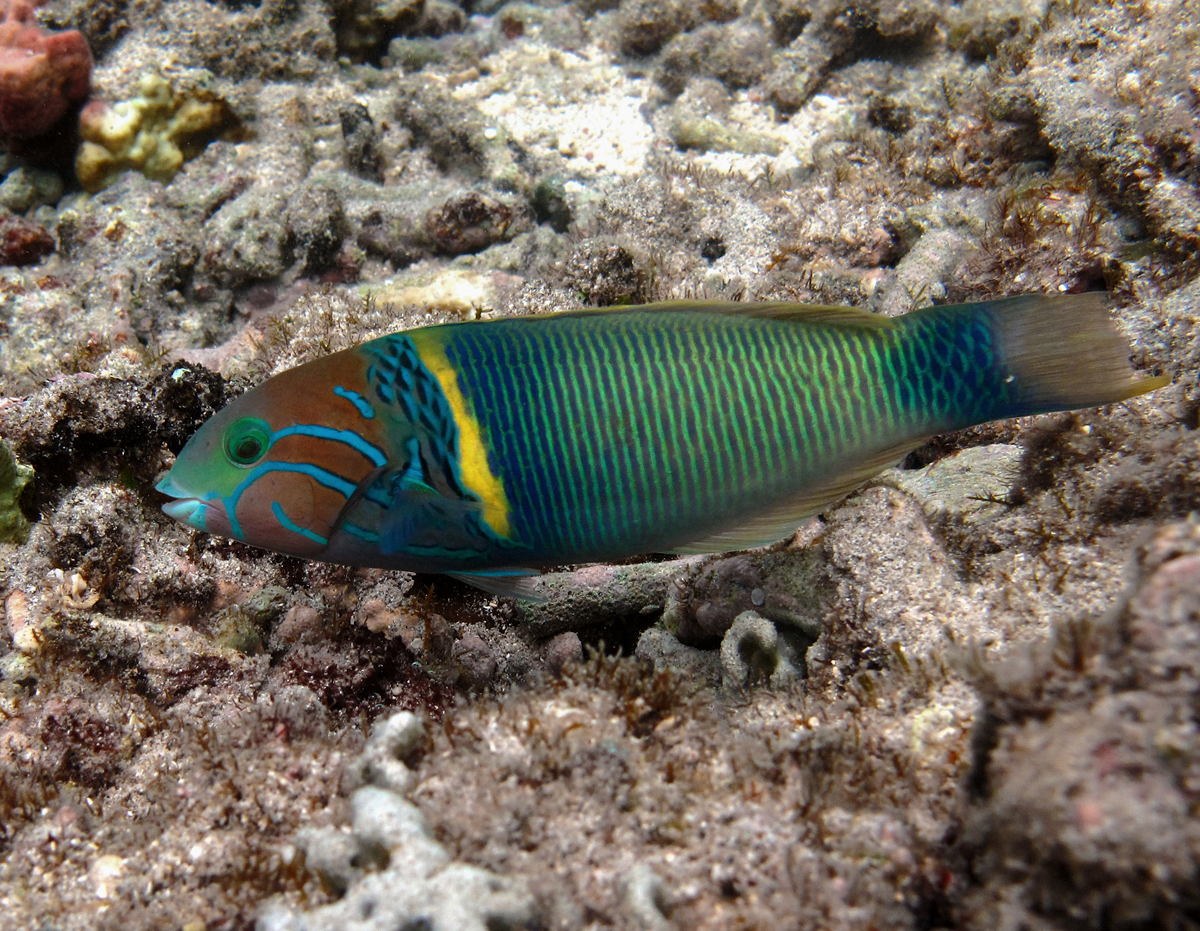

Conservation status
- Least Concern (IUCN 3.1)

Scientific classification
- Kingdom: Animalia
- Phylum: Chordata
- Class: Actinopterygii
- Division: Teleostei
- Order: Labriformes
- Family: Labridae
- Genus: Thalassoma
- Species: T. hebraicum

Binomial name
- Thalassoma hebraicum (Lacépède, 1801)

Synonyms
- Labrus hebraicus Lacépède, 1801

= Goldbar wrasse =

Species of fish

The goldbar wrasse (Thalassoma hebraicum) is a species of wrasse native to the western Indian Ocean, where it inhabits reef environments at depths from 1 to 30 m (3.3 to 98.4 ft). This species can grow to 23 cm (9.1 in) in total length. It is a target of local traditional fisheries and can also be found in the aquarium trade.

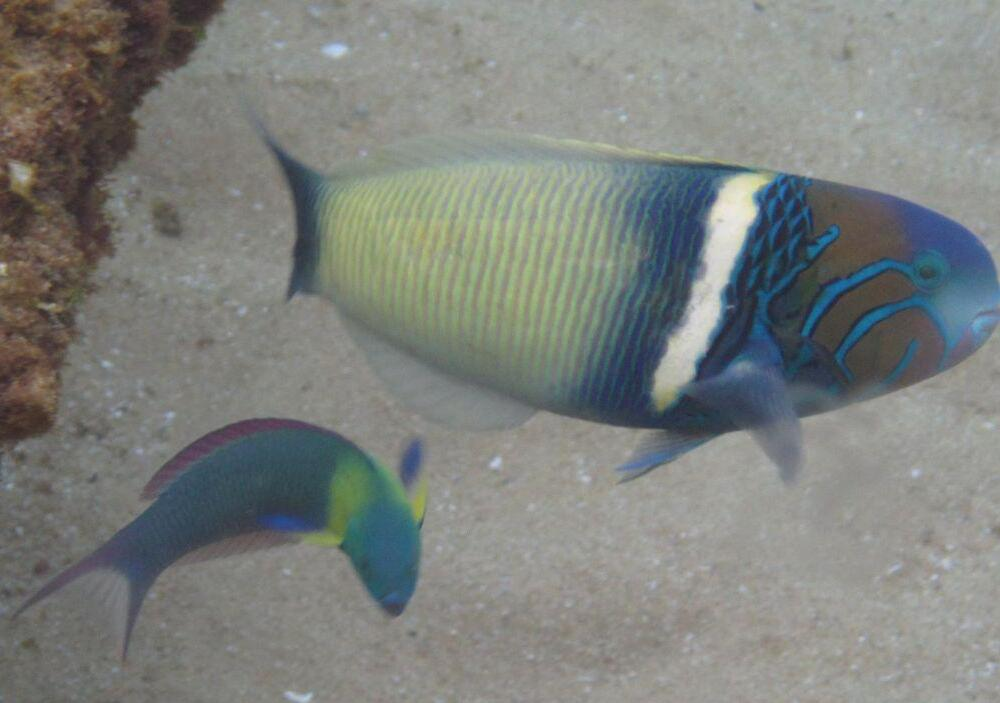
T. hebraicum (right) compared to T. amblycephalum (left)
