= Greenfish =

Greenfish is used as the common name of several unrelated groups of fish:

- Ascension wrasse, Thalassoma ascensionis (Quoy & Gaimard, 1834)
- Bluefish, Pomatomus saltatrix (Linnaeus, 1766)
- Murray cod, Maccullochella peelii peelii (Mitchell, 1838)
- Pollock, Pollachius pollachius (Linnaeus, 1758)
- St. Helena wrasse, Thalassoma sanctaehelenae (Valenciennes, 1839)

"Greenfish" was also formerly used to refer to green cod, fresh or freshly-salted Atlantic cod (Gadus morhua).

Greenfish may also refer to:

- Green Fish, a 1997 South Korean film starring Han Suk-kyu
- Greenfish recirculation technology, advanced sustainable recirculating fish farm systems
- USS Greenfish, a former United States Navy submarine
