= Thalassoma heiseri =

Conservation status
- Least Concern (IUCN 3.1)

Scientific classification
- Kingdom: Animalia
- Phylum: Chordata
- Class: Actinopterygii
- Order: Labriformes
- Family: Labridae
- Genus: Thalassoma
- Species: T. heiseri

Binomial name
- Thalassoma heiseri J. E. Randall & A. J. Edwards, 1984

Species of fish

Thalassoma heiseri is a species of wrasse native to the Pacific waters around the Tuamotus and Pitcairn Island, where it inhabits reefs. This species can grow to 11.6 cm (4.6 in) in standard length.
