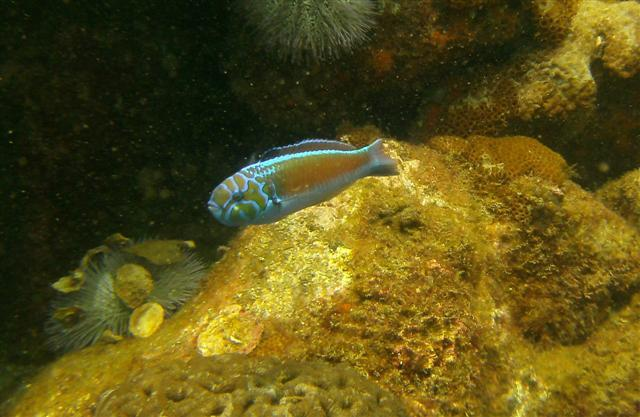

Conservation status
- Least Concern (IUCN 3.1)

Scientific classification
- Kingdom: Animalia
- Phylum: Chordata
- Class: Actinopterygii
- Order: Labriformes
- Family: Labridae
- Genus: Thalassoma
- Species: T. norohanum

Binomial name
- Thalassoma norohanum (Boulenger, 1890)

Synonyms
- Julis noronhana Boulenger, 1890

= Noronha wrasse =

Species of fish

The Noronha wrasse (Thalassoma noronhanum) is a species of wrasse native to the western Atlantic Ocean off the coast of Brazil and nearby islands, where it inhabits coral reefs from the surface to 60 m (200 ft) deep, though mostly much shallower, between 2 and 5 m (10 and 20 ft). Younger individuals act as cleaner fish. This species can reach 13.3 cm (5.2 in) in standard length. It can also be found in the aquarium trade.
