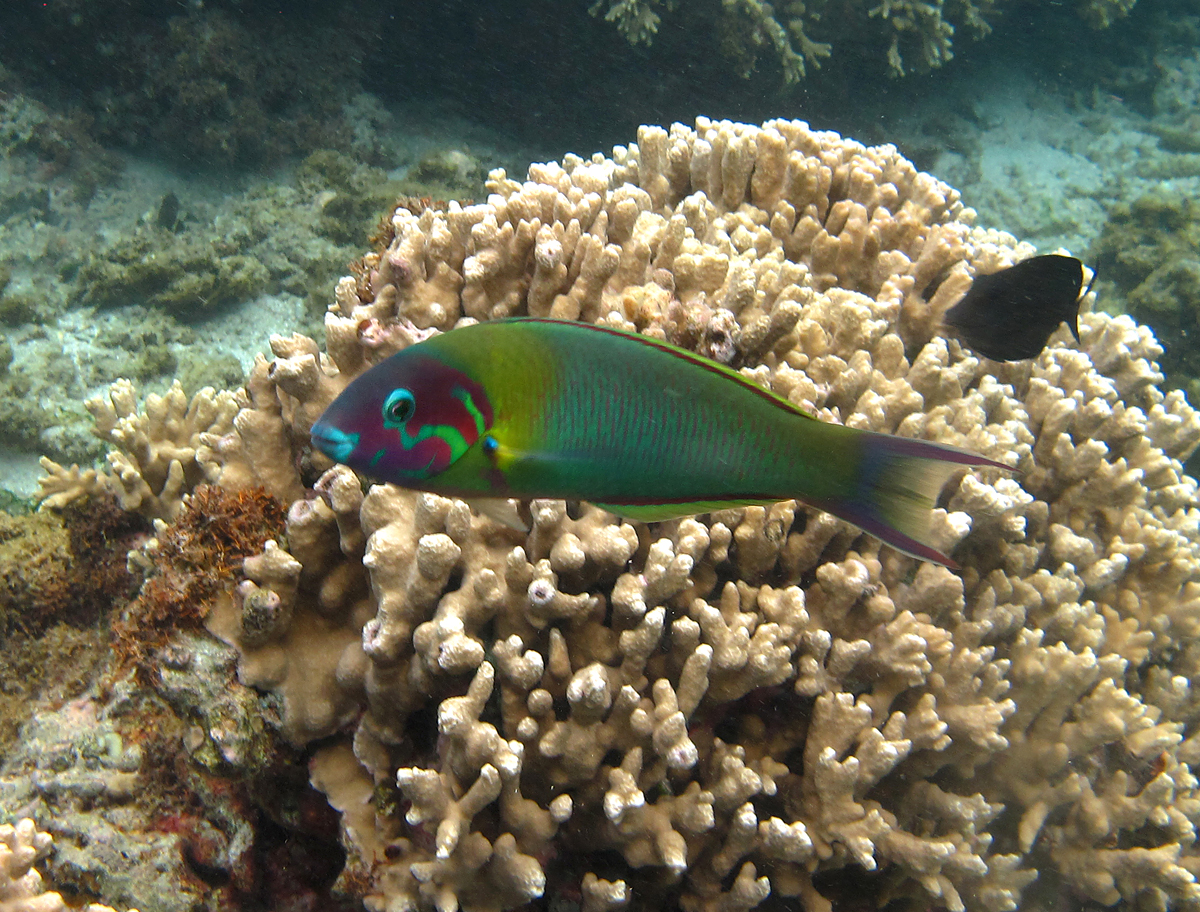

Conservation status
- Least Concern (IUCN 3.1)

Scientific classification
- Kingdom: Animalia
- Phylum: Chordata
- Class: Actinopterygii
- Order: Labriformes
- Family: Labridae
- Genus: Thalassoma
- Species: T. genivittatum

Binomial name
- Thalassoma genivittatum (Valenciennes, 1839)

Synonyms
- Julis genivittatus Valenciennes, 1839; Julis matthaei Valenciennes, 1839; Julis commersoni Valenciennes, 1839; Thalassoma commersoni (Valenciennes, 1839); Julis bicolor Günther, 1862; Thalassoma mascarenum Fricke, 1999

= Red-cheek wrasse =

Species of fish

The red-cheek wrasse (Thalassoma genivittatum) is a species of wrasse native to the western Indian Ocean, where it can be found on rocky reefs at depths from 4 to 25 m (13 to 82 ft). It can grow to 20 cm (7.9 in) in total length. This species can also be found in the aquarium trade.
