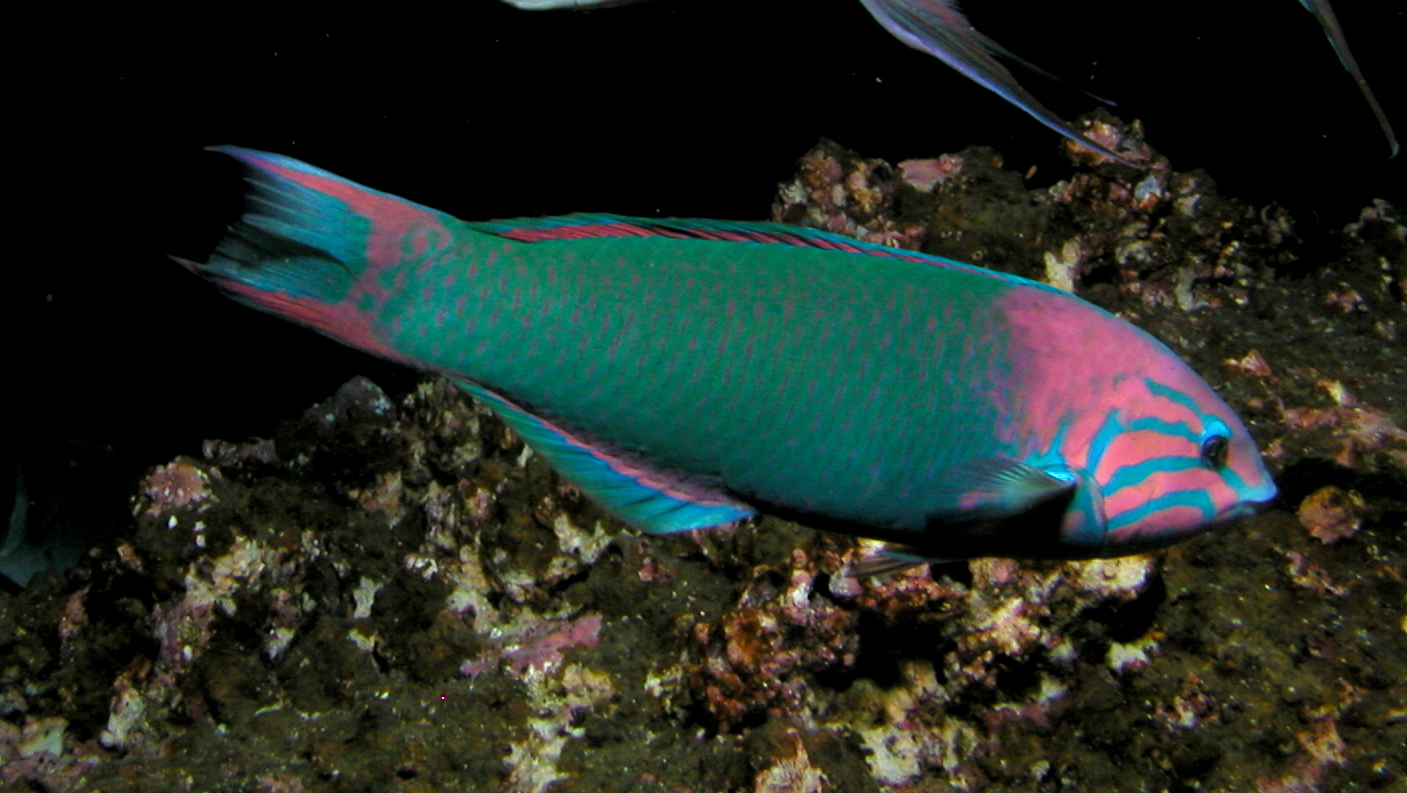

Conservation status
- Least Concern (IUCN 3.1)

Scientific classification
- Kingdom: Animalia
- Phylum: Chordata
- Class: Actinopterygii
- Order: Labriformes
- Family: Labridae
- Genus: Thalassoma
- Species: T. grammaticum

Binomial name
- Thalassoma grammaticum C. H. Gilbert, 1890

= Sunset wrasse =

Species of fish

The sunset wrasse (Thalassoma grammaticum) is a species of wrasse native to the eastern Pacific Ocean, where it can be found from Mexico to Peru. It is an inhabitant of reefs at depths from 3 to 42 m (9.8 to 137.8 ft). It can grow to 32 cm (13 in) in total length.

== Gallery ==
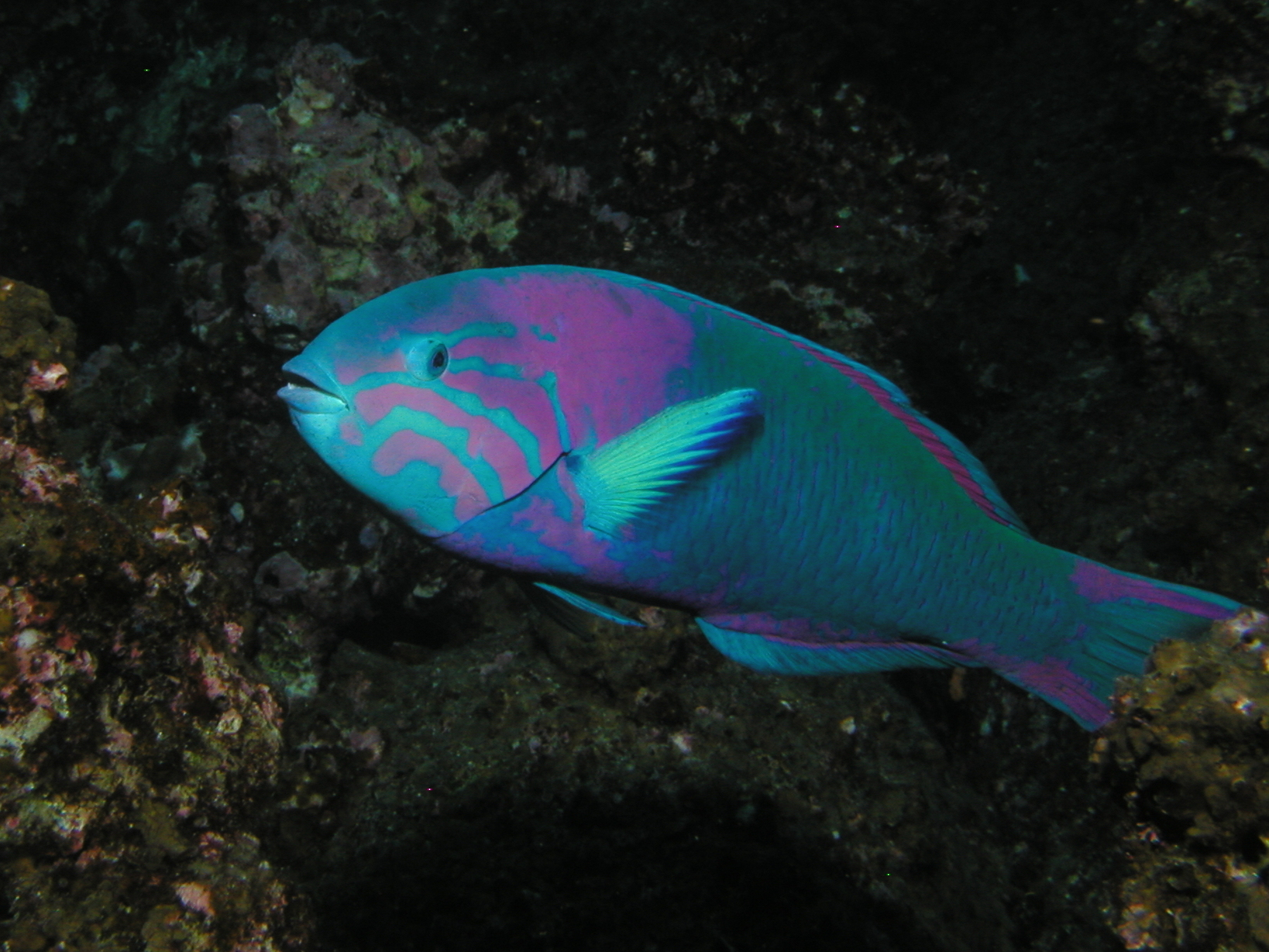

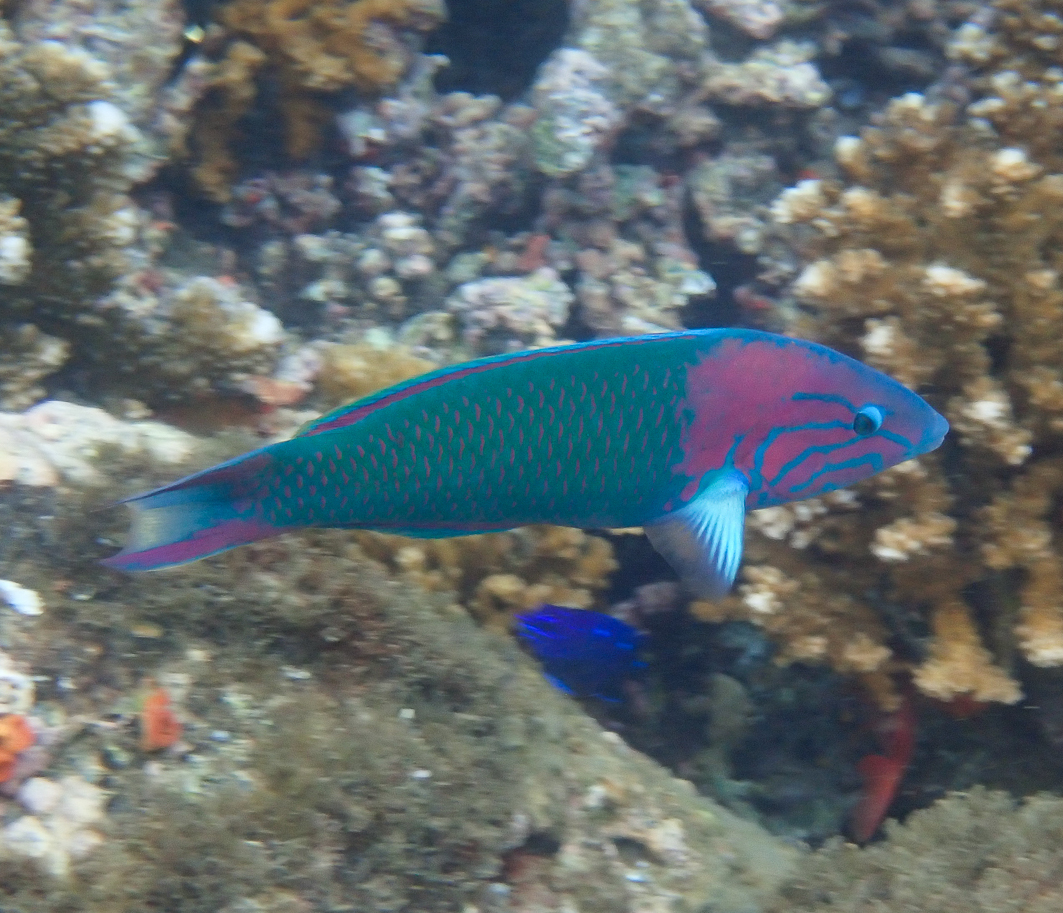

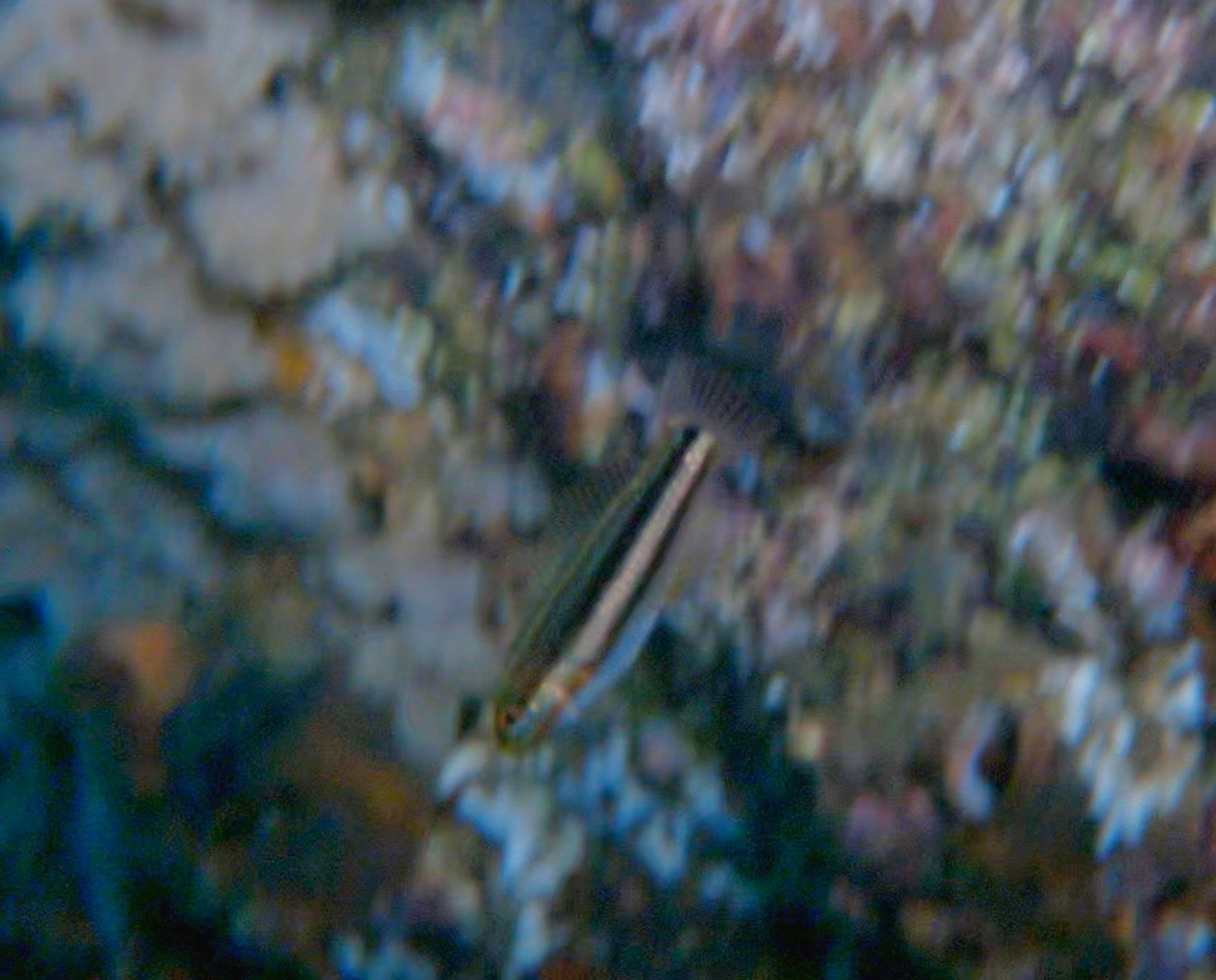
Juvenile

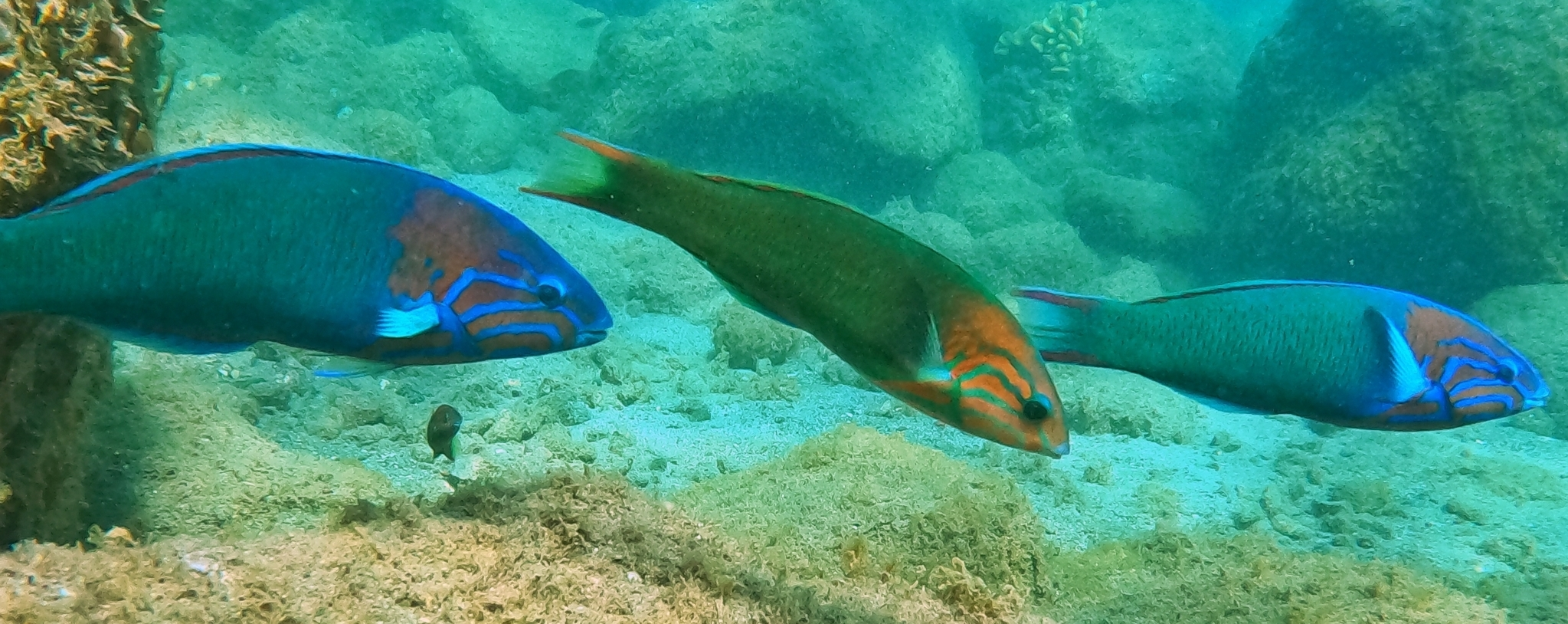
