= Thalassoma newtoni =

Conservation status
- Least Concern (IUCN 3.1)

Scientific classification
- Kingdom: Animalia
- Phylum: Chordata
- Class: Actinopterygii
- Order: Labriformes
- Family: Labridae
- Genus: Thalassoma
- Species: T. newtoni

Binomial name
- Thalassoma newtoni (Osório, 1891)

Synonyms
- Julis newtoni Osório, 1891

Species of fish

Thalassoma newtoni is a species of marine fish in the family Labridae, the wrasses. It occurs in the waters around São Tomé and Príncipe, and possibly along the West African coast between Ghana and Angola. It inhabits rocky reefs to depths around 40 m (130 ft).
