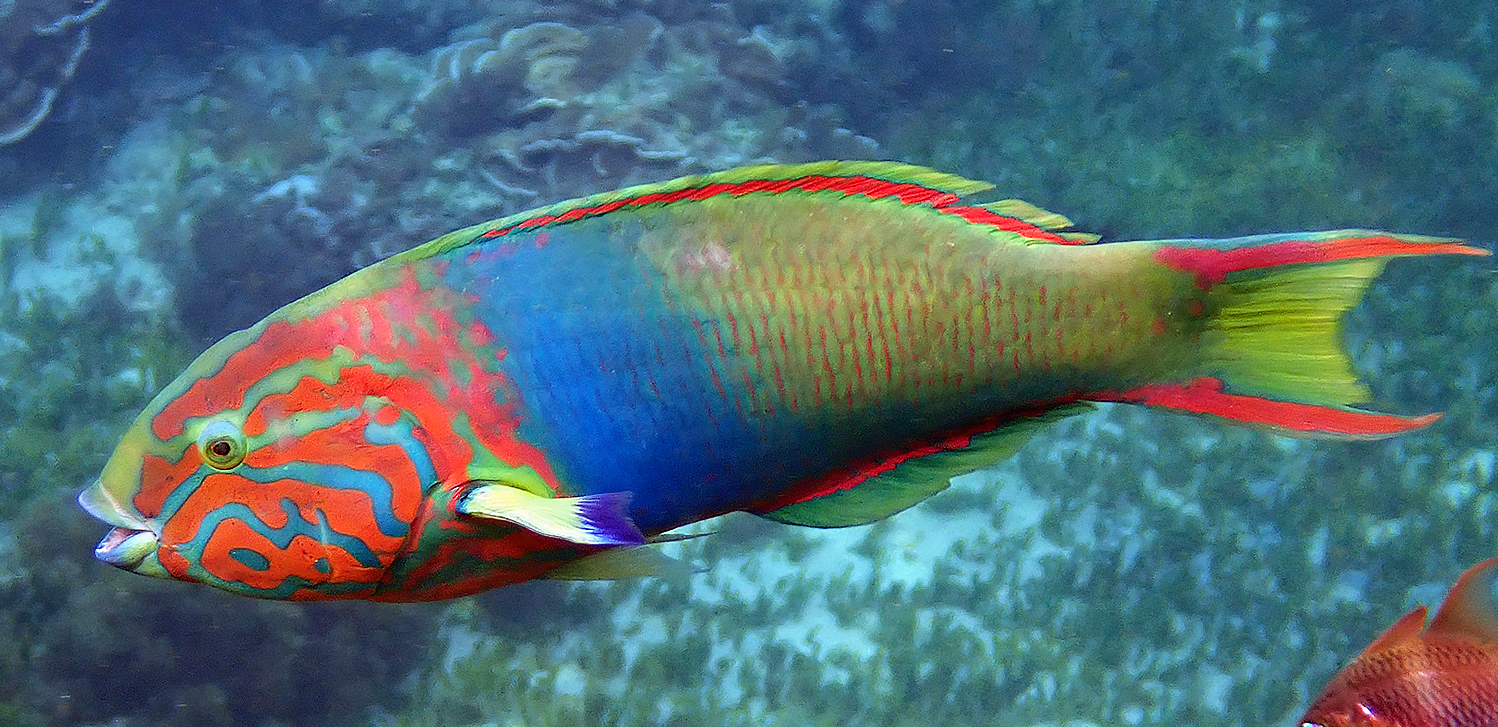
- Sunset wrasse (T. lutescens)
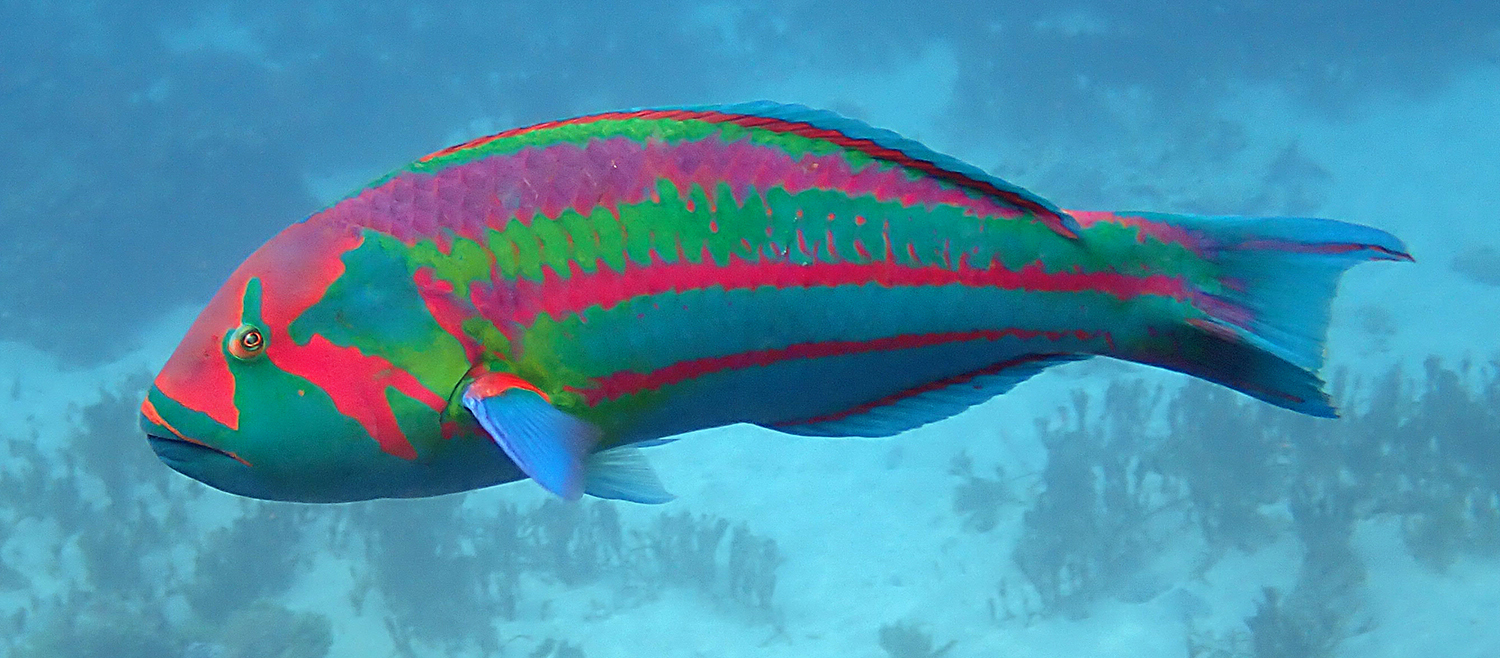
- Surge wrasse (T. purpureum)

Scientific classification
- Kingdom: Animalia
- Phylum: Chordata
- Class: Actinopterygii
- Order: Labriformes
- Family: Labridae
- Subfamily: Julidinae
- Genus: Thalassoma; Swainson, 1839

Type species
- Scarus purpureus Forsskål, 1775

Synonyms
- Chloricthys Swainson, 1839; Bermudichthys Nichols, 1920; Pseudojulops Fowler, 1941

= Thalassoma =

Genus of fishes

Thalassoma is a genus of wrasses native to the Atlantic, Indian and Pacific Oceans. Many species occasionally make their way into the aquarium trade.

== Taxonomy ==
Although traditionally considered distinct genera, studies have repeatedly found that the two species of Gomphosus are nested within Thalassoma. This close affinity is reflected by the fact that in the wild, Gomphosus will sometimes create hybrid offspring with Thalassoma species. In 2025, it was proposed that all species in Thalassoma should be transferred to Gomphosus.

== Species ==
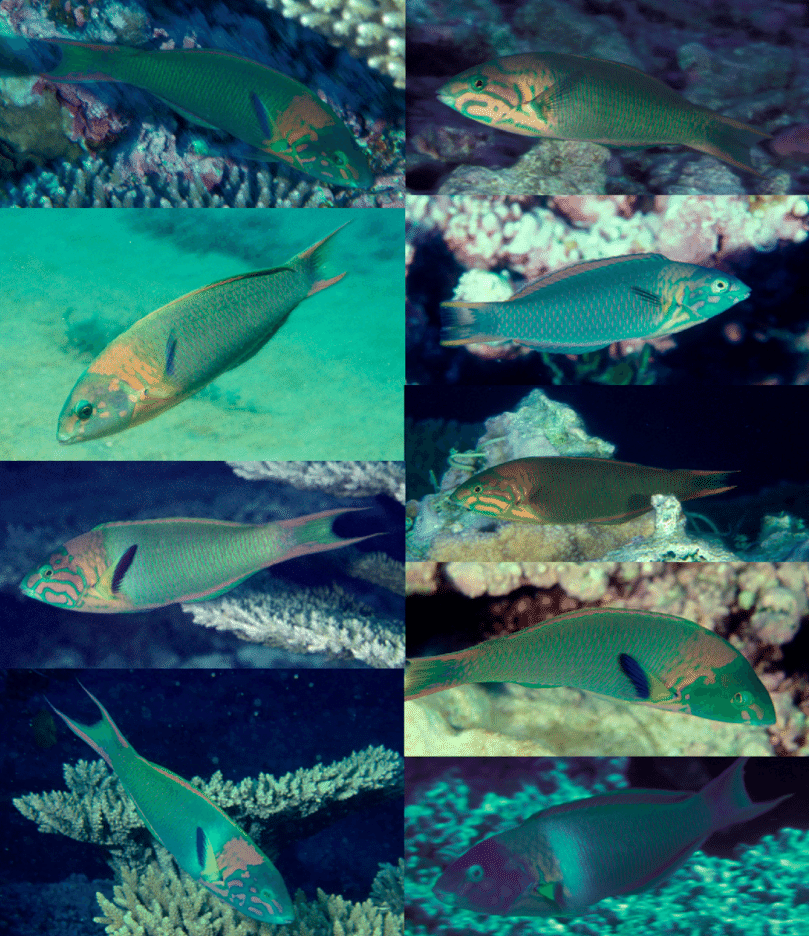
Hybrids (T. duperrey x lutescens)

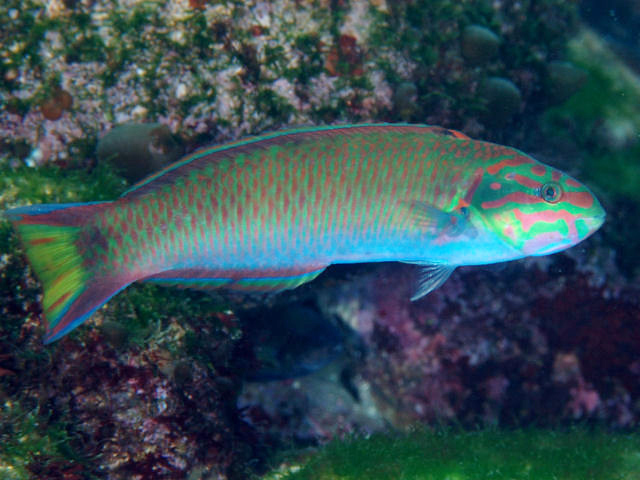
Hybrid (T. lunare x cupido)

The currently recognized species in this genus are:

Species	Common name	Image
Thalassoma amblycephalum (Bleeker, 1856)	blunt-headed wrasse	
Thalassoma ascensionis (Quoy & Gaimard, 1834)	Ascension wrasse	
Thalassoma ballieui (Vaillant & Sauvage, 1875)	blacktail wrasse	
Thalassoma bifasciatum (Bloch, 1791)	bluehead wrasse	
Thalassoma cupido (Temminck & Schlegel, 1845)	Cupid wrasse	
Thalassoma duperrey (Quoy & Gaimard, 1824)	saddle wrasse	
Thalassoma genivittatum (Valenciennes, 1839)	red-cheek wrasse	
Thalassoma grammaticum C. H. Gilbert, 1890	sunset wrasse	
Thalassoma hardwicke (J. W. Bennett, 1830)	sixbar wrasse	
Thalassoma hebraicum (Lacépède, 1801)	goldbar wrasse	
Thalassoma heiseri J. E. Randall & A. J. Edwards, 1984	Pitcairn rainbow wrasse	
Thalassoma jansenii (Bleeker, 1856)	Jansen's wrasse	
Thalassoma loxum J. E. Randall & Mee, 1994	Oman wrasse	
Thalassoma lucasanum (T. N. Gill, 1862)	Cortez rainbow wrasse	
Thalassoma lunare (Linnaeus, 1758)	moon wrasse	
Thalassoma lutescens (Lay & E. T. Bennett, 1839)	sunset wrasse	
Thalassoma newtoni (Osório, 1891)	Newton's wrasse	
Thalassoma nigrofasciatum J. E. Randall, 2003	black-barred wrasse	
Thalassoma noronhanum (Boulenger, 1890)	Noronha wrasse	
Thalassoma pavo (Linnaeus, 1758)	ornate wrasse	
Thalassoma purpureum (Forsskål, 1775)	surge wrasse	
Thalassoma quinquevittatum (Lay & E. T. Bennett, 1839)	fivestripe wrasse	
Thalassoma robertsoni G. R. Allen, 1995	Robertson's rainbow wrasse	
Thalassoma rueppellii (Klunzinger, 1871)	Klunzinger's wrasse	
Thalassoma sanctaehelenae (Valenciennes, 1839)	St. Helena wrasse	
Thalassoma septemfasciata T. D. Scott, 1959	seven-banded wrasse	
Thalassoma trilobatum (Lacépède, 1801)	Christmas wrasse	
Thalassoma virens C. H. Gilbert, 1890	emerald wrasse	
