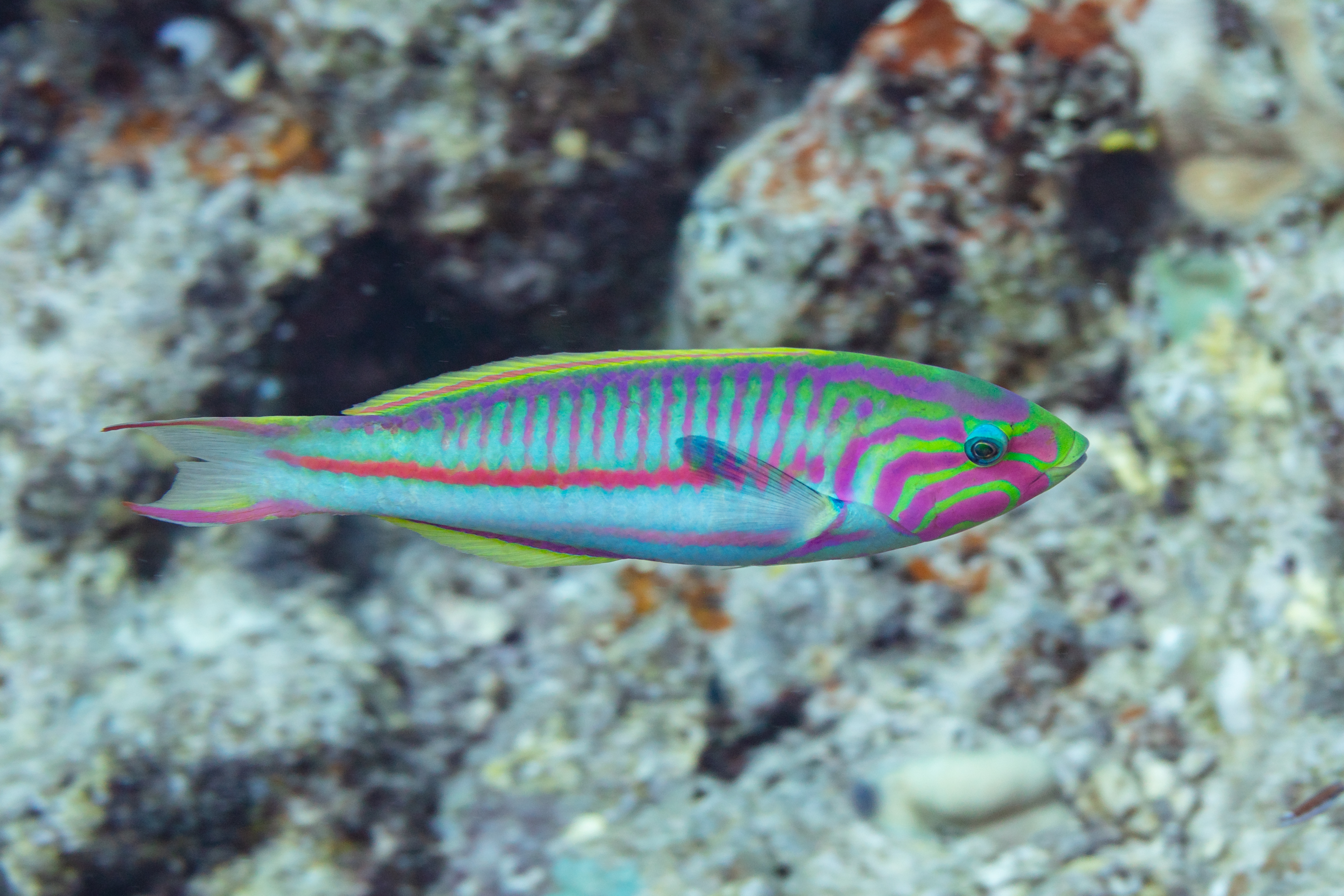

Conservation status
- Least Concern (IUCN 3.1)

Scientific classification
- Kingdom: Animalia
- Phylum: Chordata
- Class: Actinopterygii
- Division: Teleostei
- Order: Labriformes
- Family: Labridae
- Genus: Thalassoma
- Species: T. rueppellii

Binomial name
- Thalassoma rueppellii (Klunzinger, 1871)

Synonyms
- Julis rueppellii Klunzinger, 1871; Thalassoma klunzingeri Fowler & Steinitz, 1956

= Klunzinger's wrasse =

Species of fish

Klunzinger's wrasse (Thalassoma rueppellii), also known as Rüppell's wrasse, is a species of ray-finned fish. A wrasse from the family Labridae, Rüppell's wrappse is endemic to the Red Sea. It inhabits the margins and seaward slopes of reefs at depths from 1 to 30 m (3.3 to 98.4 ft). Rüppell's wrappse can reach 20 cm (7.9 in) in total length. This species can be found in the aquarium trade.

== Gallery ==
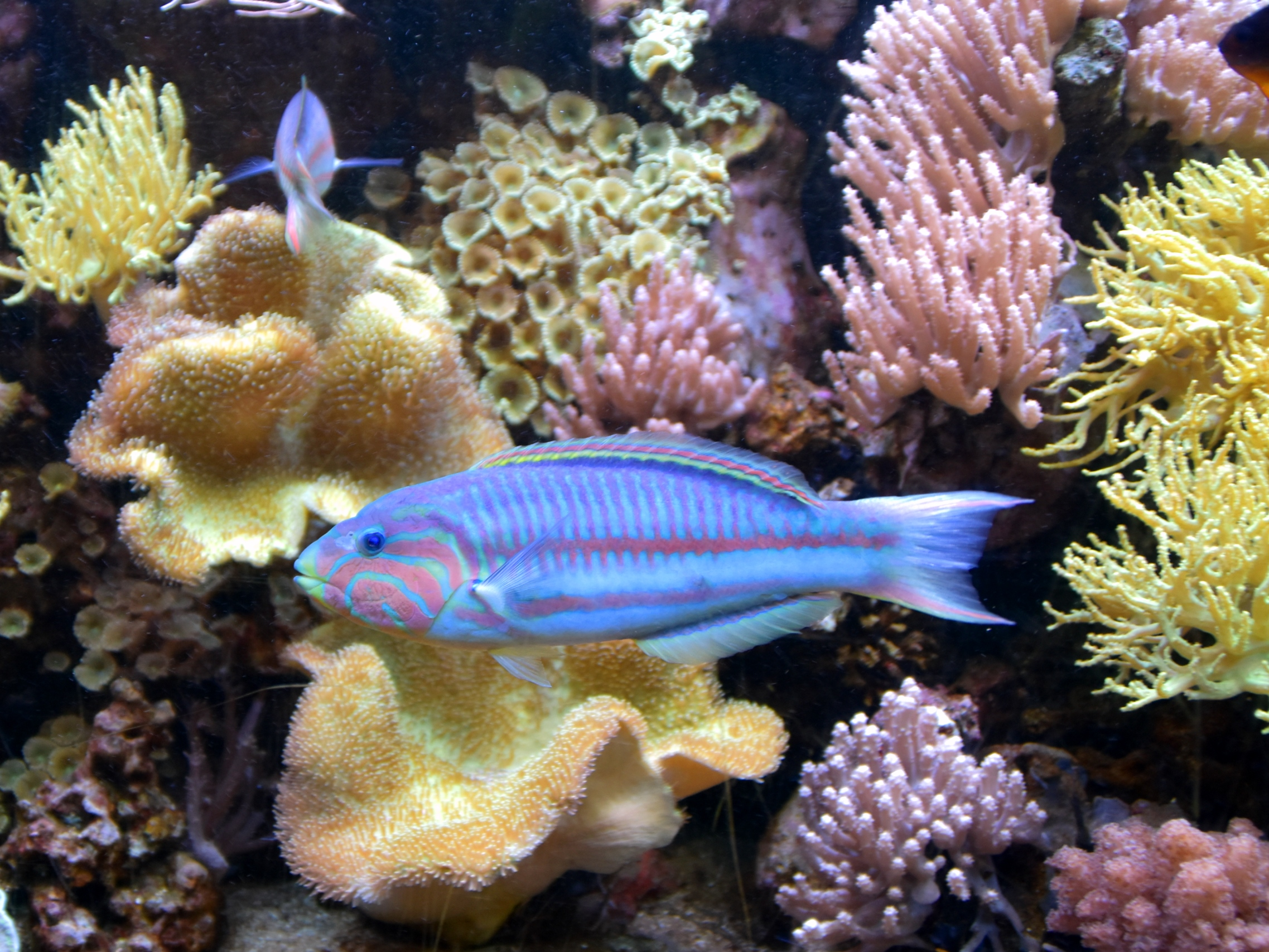
Klunzinger's Wrasse in Opel Zoo, Germany
