= Ascension wrasse =

Conservation status
- Data Deficient (IUCN 3.1)

Scientific classification
- Kingdom: Animalia
- Phylum: Chordata
- Class: Actinopterygii
- Order: Labriformes
- Family: Labridae
- Genus: Thalassoma
- Species: T. ascensionis

Binomial name
- Thalassoma ascensionis (Quoy & Gaimard, 1834)

Synonyms
- Julis ascensionis Quoy & Gaimard, 1834; Julis lessonii Valenciennes, 1839

Species of fish

The Ascension wrasse (Thalassoma ascensionis) is a species of wrasse native to the eastern Atlantic Ocean, where it is known from St. Helena, Ascension Island, and São Tomé. It inhabits areas of seagrass with rocks at depths from 1 to 30 m (3.3 to 98.4 ft). It can reach 10 cm (3.9 in) in standard length. It is one of several fishes commonly called greenfish.
