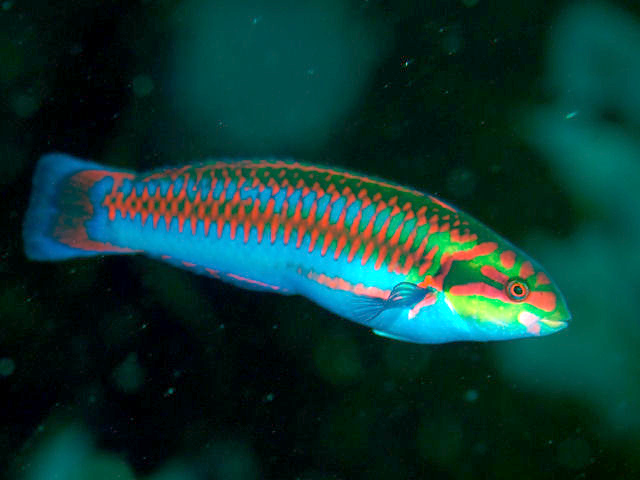

Conservation status
- Least Concern (IUCN 3.1)

Scientific classification
- Kingdom: Animalia
- Phylum: Chordata
- Class: Actinopterygii
- Division: Teleostei
- Order: Labriformes
- Family: Labridae
- Genus: Thalassoma
- Species: T. cupido

Binomial name
- Thalassoma cupido (Temminck & Schlegel, 1845)

Synonyms
- Julis cupido Temminck & Schlegel, 1845

= Thalassoma cupido =

Species of fish

Thalassoma cupido is a species of wrasse native to the northwestern Pacific Ocean, where it occurs from Japan to Taiwan. It is an inhabitant of coral or rocky reefs and occurs at depths from 3 to 10 m (9.8 to 32.8 ft). This species can reach 20 cm (7.9 in) total length, though most do not exceed 14 cm (5.5 in). This species can also be found in the aquarium trade and is farmed in Japan.

== Gallery ==
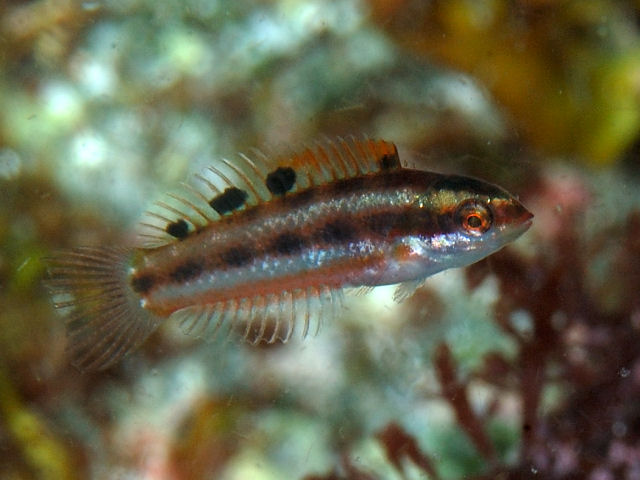
Juvenile

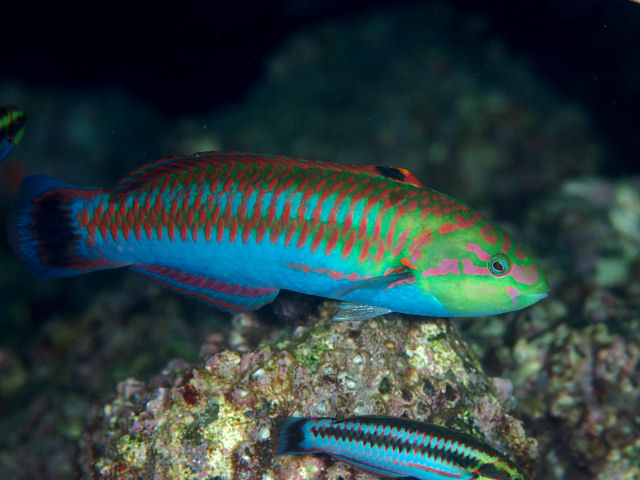
Adult

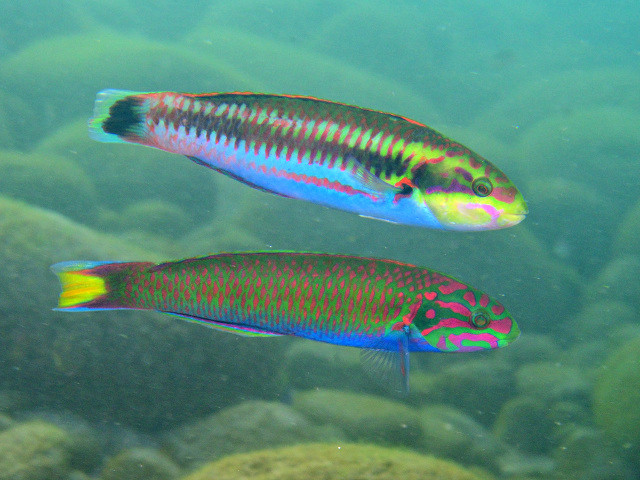
T. cupido (top) and hybrid T. cupido x lunare (bottom).

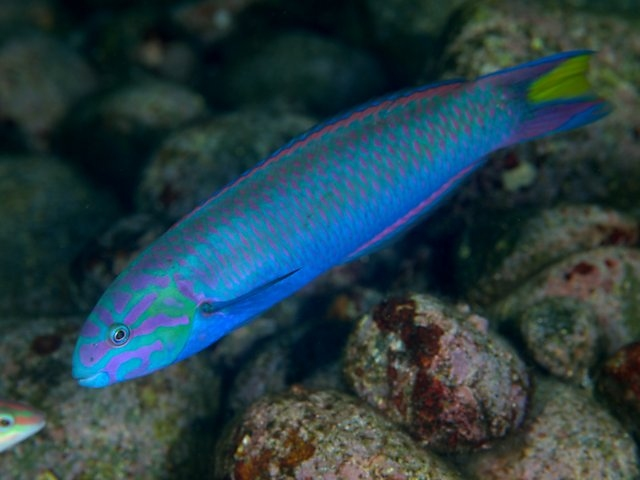
Blue coloured male hybrid T. cupido x lunare.
