= Thalassoma loxum =

Conservation status
- Data Deficient (IUCN 3.1)

Scientific classification
- Kingdom: Animalia
- Phylum: Chordata
- Class: Actinopterygii
- Order: Labriformes
- Family: Labridae
- Genus: Thalassoma
- Species: T. loxum

Binomial name
- Thalassoma loxum J. E. Randall & Mee, 1994

Species of fish

Thalassoma loxum is a species of wrasse endemic to the Arabian Sea, where it is only known from the waters of Oman. It can be found in quite shallow waters at depths from the surface to 2 m (6.6 ft). This species can reach 18 cm (7.1 in) in total length.
