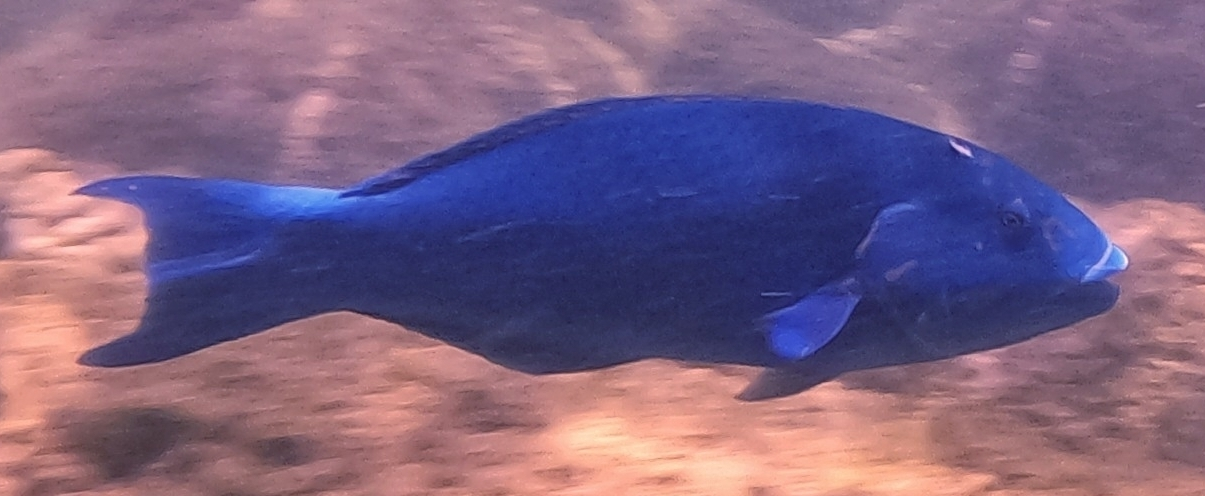

Conservation status
- Vulnerable (IUCN 3.1)

Scientific classification
- Kingdom: Animalia
- Phylum: Chordata
- Class: Actinopterygii
- Order: Labriformes
- Family: Labridae
- Genus: Thalassoma
- Species: T. virens

Binomial name
- Thalassoma virens C. H. Gilbert, 1890

= Thalassoma virens =

Species of fish

Thalassoma virens, commonly called the emerald wrasse, is a species of ray-finned fish, a wrasse from the family Labridae, which is endemic to the reefs in waters around the Revillagigedo Islands and Clipperton Island (though during El Niño years, it has been recorded from Baja California). This species can reach 30 cm (12 in) in total length.
