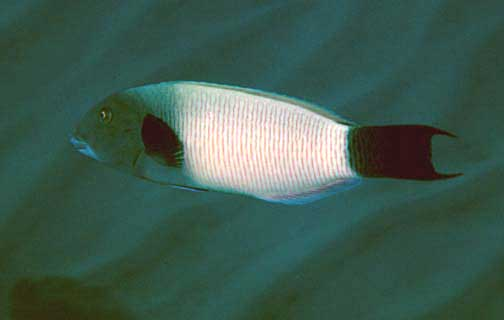

Conservation status
- Least Concern (IUCN 3.1)

Scientific classification
- Kingdom: Animalia
- Phylum: Chordata
- Class: Actinopterygii
- Order: Labriformes
- Family: Labridae
- Genus: Thalassoma
- Species: T. ballieui

Binomial name
- Thalassoma ballieui (Vaillant & Sauvage, 1875)

Synonyms
- Julis ballieui Vaillant & Sauvage, 1875; Julis obscura Günther, 1880; Julis verticalis R. Smith & Swain, 1882

= Blacktail wrasse =

Species of fish

The blacktail wrasse (Thalassoma ballieui), also known as Ballieu's wrasse, is a species of wrasse native to the waters around the Hawaiian Islands and Johnston Island. It is a reef dweller found at depths from 1 to 60 m (3.3 to 196.9 ft). It can reach 39.5 cm (15.6 in) in length. It can also be found in the aquarium trade.
