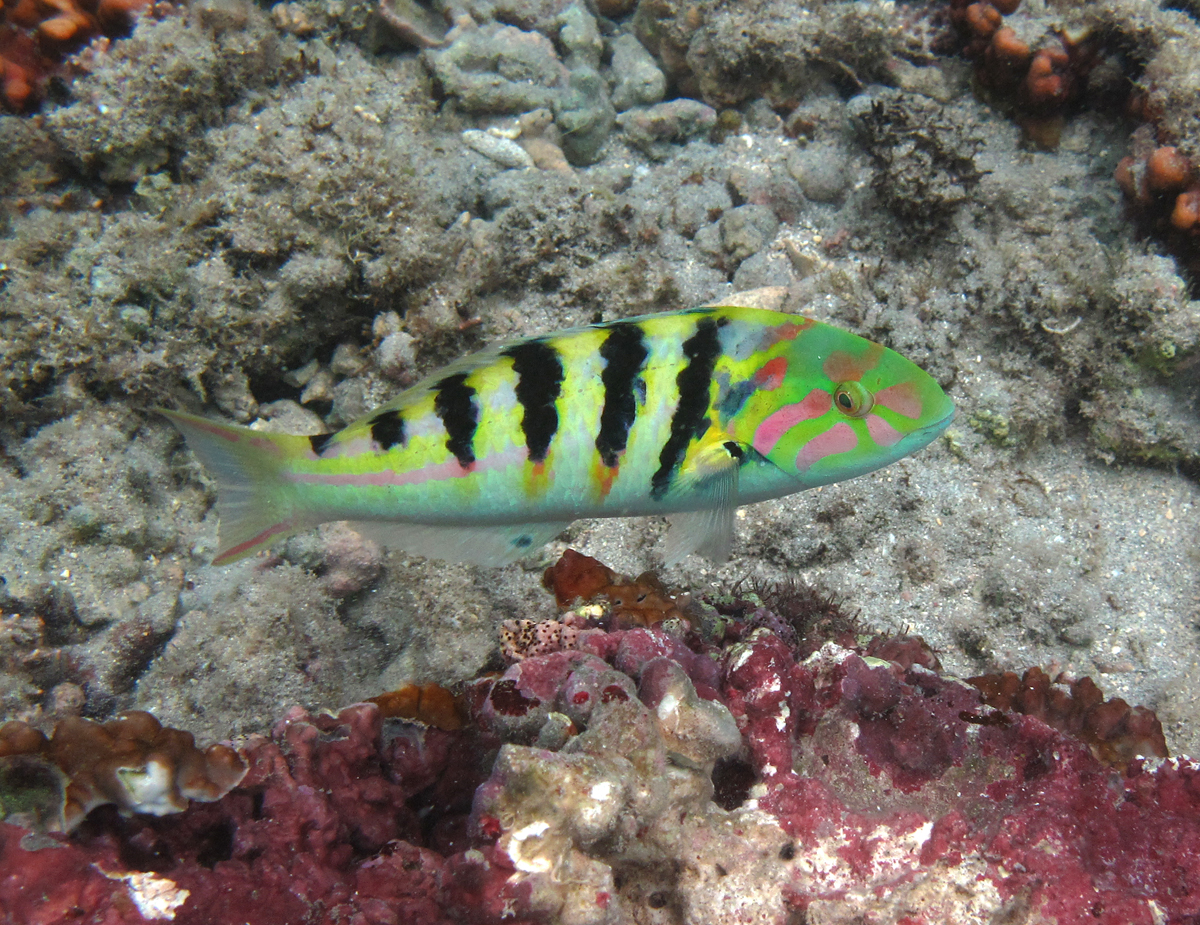

Conservation status
- Least Concern (IUCN 3.1)

Scientific classification
- Kingdom: Animalia
- Phylum: Chordata
- Class: Actinopterygii
- Order: Labriformes
- Family: Labridae
- Genus: Thalassoma
- Species: T. hardwicke

Binomial name
- Thalassoma hardwicke (J. W. Bennett, 1830)

Synonyms
- Sparus hardwicke J. W. Bennett, 1830; Julis schwanenfeldii Bleeker, 1853; Thalassoma schwanefeldi (Bleeker, 1853); Thalassoma schwanenfeldii (Bleeker, 1853)

= Sixbar wrasse =

Species of fish

The sixbar wrasse or six-banded wrasse (Thalassoma hardwicke) is a species of wrasse in the family Labridae, native to the Indian Ocean and the western Pacific Ocean. It is an inhabitant of reef environments at depths from the surface down to 15 m (50 ft). This species can grow to 20 cm (8 in) in total length, though most individuals do not exceed 15 cm (6 in). It is of minor importance to local commercial fisheries and can also be found in the aquarium trade.

== Description ==
The sixbar wrasse grows to a maximum total length of 20 cm (8 in). The dorsal fin has 8 spines and 12 to 14 soft rays, while the anal fin has 3 spines and 11 soft rays. It is a greenish fish with four dark bars on its upper body and two more saddle-like bars over the caudal peduncle. In larger adults, the head has a number of pink streaks radiating from near the eye.

== Distribution and habitat ==
The sixbar wrasse is native to the tropical Indo-Pacific between 30°N and 32°S. Its range extends from East Africa and Madagascar to Japan, Indonesia, the Philippines, northern Australia and various island groups in the Western Pacific. It is found on coral reefs, reef slopes and in lagoons, down to depths of 15 m (50 ft) or more.

== Ecology ==
The sixbar wrasse is diurnal and has a home range that exceeds 1,000 m^{2} (11,000 ft^{2}). It forms small groups and feeds on planktonic and benthic crustaceans, foraminiferans, small fish, fish eggs and fish larvae. Males and females form pairs during the breeding season, and at this time males develop a gaudier colour and a black spot in the centre of the caudal fin.

An aquarium fish of this species was observed to use a rock as an anvil. The fish was fed pellets that were too hard for it to chew and too large for it to swallow. The fish carried each pellet to a particular rock where it succeeded in breaking the pellet into pieces. It used the same behaviour and the same rock on a number of occasions, demonstrating a capacity for remembering how to solve the hard-pellet problem.

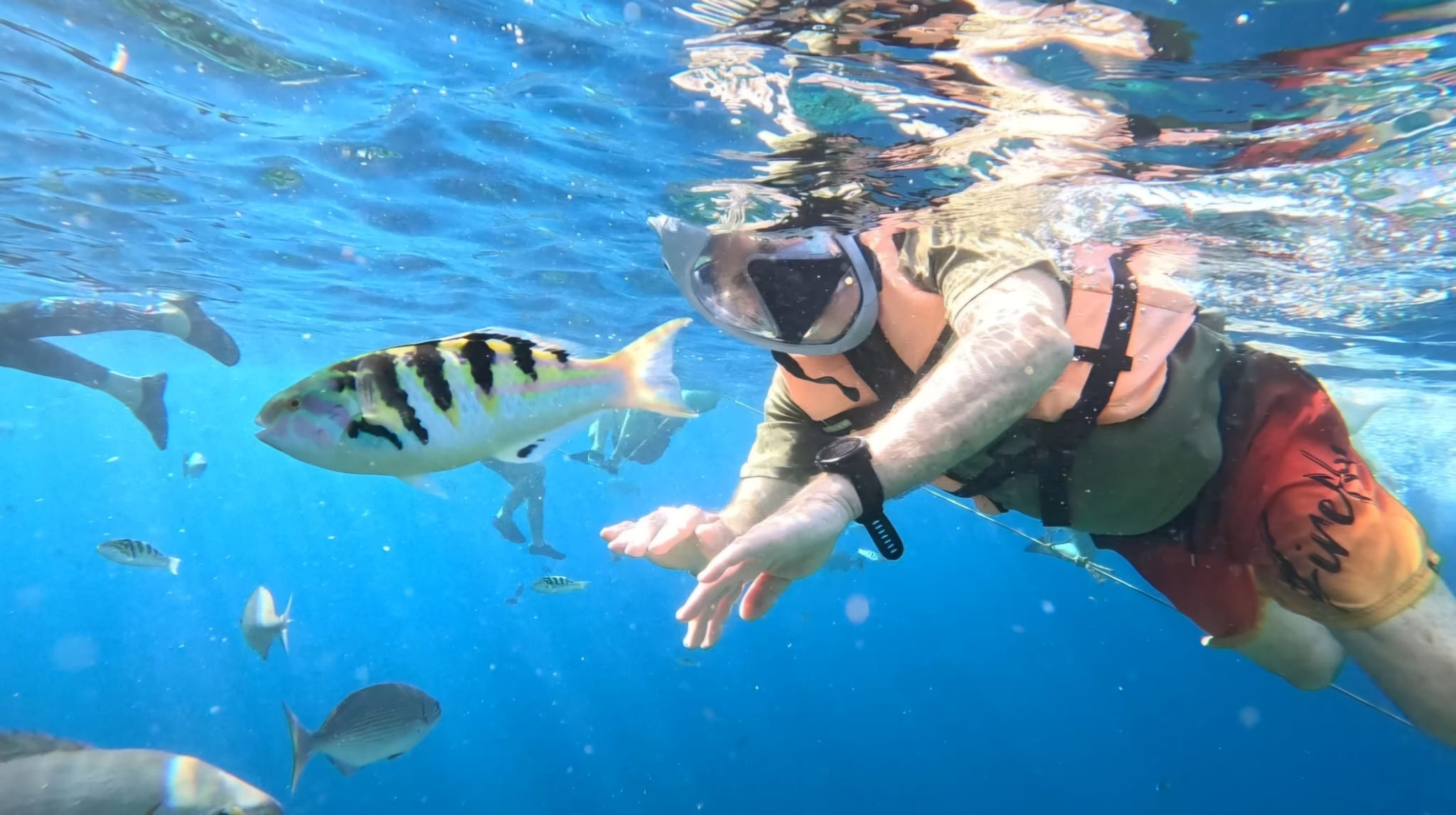
Sixbar wrasse from the Philipinnes

== Use in aquaria ==
The sixbar wrasse is sometimes seen in the aquarium trade. It appreciates a large tank with a sandy base and a number of rocks to provide caves and crevices for shelter and hunting. It may move aquarium objects around to discover tubeworms, molluscs and other invertebrates underneath. It will also feed on shrimps, crabs and small fish, bashing larger prey on rocks to break them in pieces. It is capable of jumping out of the aquarium and will submerge itself in the sand when frightened.

== Status ==
The sixbar wrasse is a common species with a wide range. Although sometimes collected for the aquarium trade, this is thought to be of only local significance and no other major threats have been identified, so the International Union for Conservation of Nature has assessed its conservation status as being of "least concern".

== Species description ==
Thalassoma hardwicke was originally formally described as Sparus hardwicke in 1830 by the English John Whitchurch Bennett (1790-1853) with the type locality given as the south coast of Ceylon. The specific name honours Bennett's friend and fellow naturalist, Major-General Thomas Hardwicke (1756-1835).
