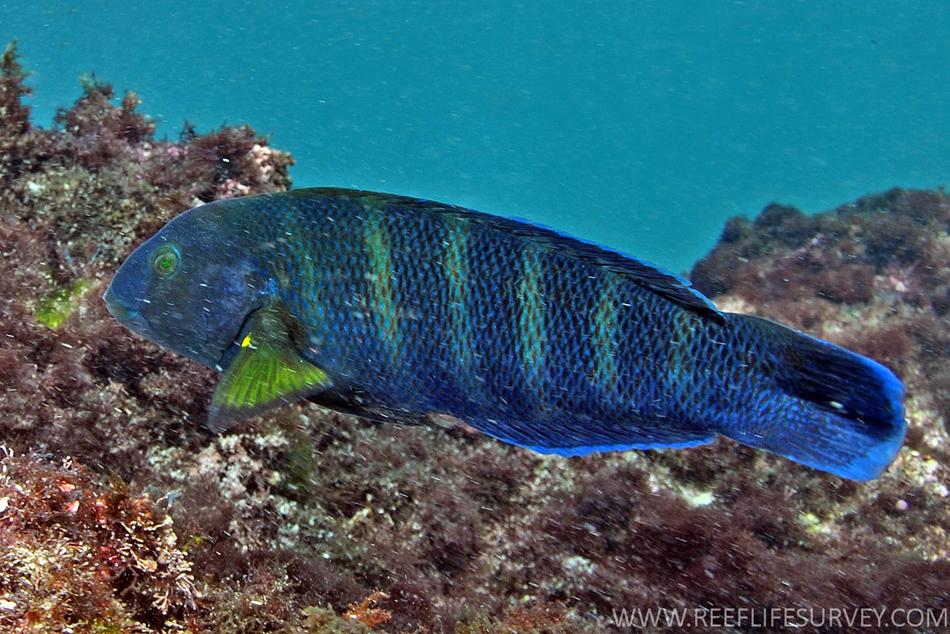

Conservation status
- Data Deficient (IUCN 3.1)

Scientific classification
- Kingdom: Animalia
- Phylum: Chordata
- Class: Actinopterygii
- Order: Labriformes
- Family: Labridae
- Genus: Thalassoma
- Species: T. septemfasciatum

Binomial name
- Thalassoma septemfasciatum T. D. Scott, 1959

= Seven-banded wrasse =

Species of fish

The seven-banded wrasse (Thalassoma septemfasciatum) is a species of ray-finned fish, a wrasse from the family Labridae which is endemic to the Indian Ocean waters of Western Australia. This species is known to occur on reefs in areas with plentiful rocks and weeds. It can reach 31 cm (12 in) in total length.
