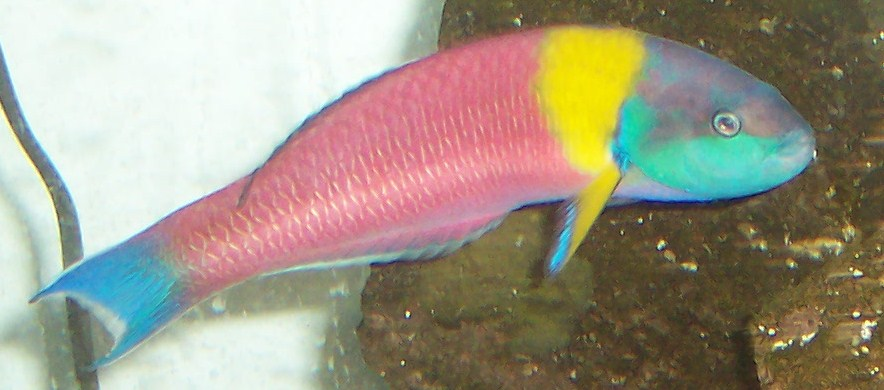

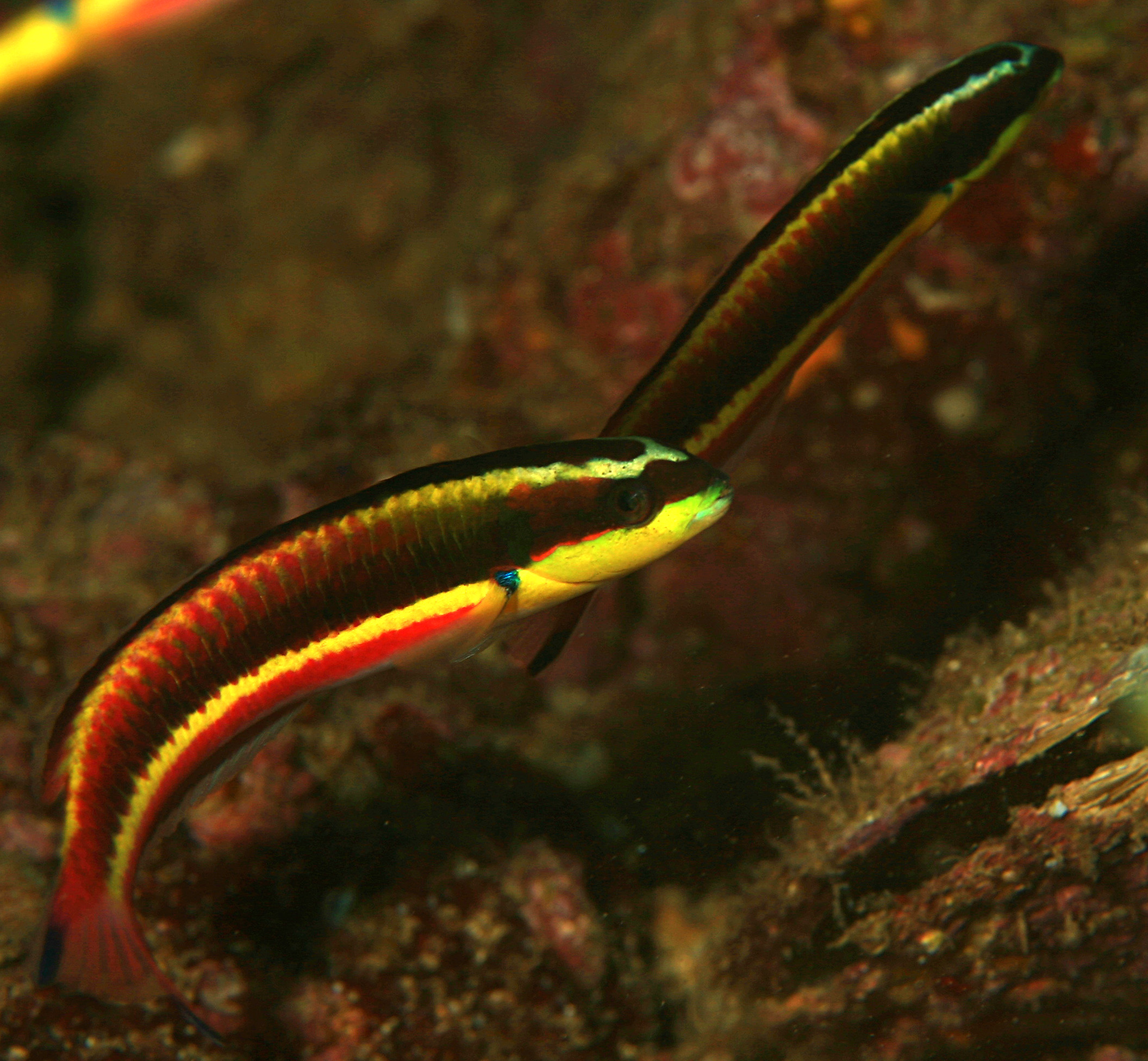
- Terminal phase above, primary phase below

Conservation status
- Least Concern (IUCN 3.1)

Scientific classification
- Kingdom: Animalia
- Phylum: Chordata
- Class: Actinopterygii
- Order: Labriformes
- Family: Labridae
- Genus: Thalassoma
- Species: T. lucasanum

Binomial name
- Thalassoma lucasanum (T. N. Gill, 1862)

Synonyms
- Julis lucasanus T. N. Gill, 1862

= Cortez rainbow wrasse =

Species of fish

The Cortez rainbow wrasse (Thalassoma lucasanum) is a species of wrasse native to the eastern Pacific Ocean from Baja California to Peru, as well as around the Galapagos Islands. It is a reef inhabitant, occurring in small schools from the surface to depths of 64 m (210 ft), though rarely deeper than 25 m (82 ft) or shallower than 2 m (6.6 ft). It is generally very common. It can also be found in the aquarium trade. This species can reach 15 cm (5.9 in) in total length. It feeds on small organisms such as crustaceans, plankton and fish eggs, and the young are cleaner fish.
