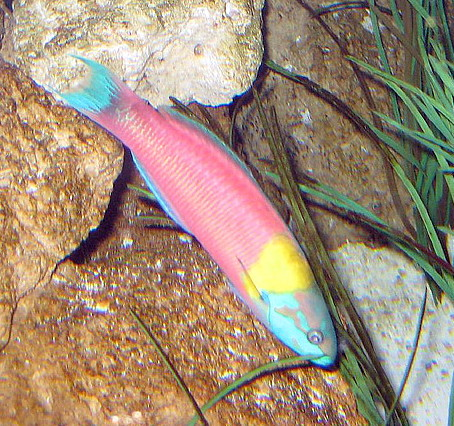

Conservation status
- Vulnerable (IUCN 3.1)

Scientific classification
- Kingdom: Animalia
- Phylum: Chordata
- Class: Actinopterygii
- Order: Labriformes
- Family: Labridae
- Genus: Thalassoma
- Species: T. robertsoni

Binomial name
- Thalassoma robertsoni G. R. Allen, 1995

= Thalassoma robertsoni =

Species of fish

Thalassoma robertsoni is a species of wrasse only known to occur in the waters around Clipperton Island. It occurs at depths from 3 to 50 m (9.8 to 164.0 ft) on the outer reef slope and shows a preference for strong wave action . This species can reach 7.8 cm (3.1 in) in standard length. The specific name of this species honours Dr. D. Ross Robertson of the Smithsonian Tropical Research Institute in recognition of his contribution to the study of reef fishes.
