= St. Helena wrasse =

Conservation status
- Data Deficient (IUCN 3.1)

Scientific classification
- Kingdom: Animalia
- Phylum: Chordata
- Class: Actinopterygii
- Order: Labriformes
- Family: Labridae
- Genus: Thalassoma
- Species: T. sanctahelenae

Binomial name
- Thalassoma sanctahelenae (Valenciennes, 1839)

Synonyms
- Julis sanctaehelenae Valenciennes, 1839

Species of fish endemic to the waters around St. Helena

The St. Helena wrasse (Thalassoma sanctahelenae) is a species of marine ray-finned fish, a wrasse from the family Labridae. This poorly known species is endemic to the waters around St. Helena. It is a species associated with reef sand it is found in shallow coastal waters in the vicinity of rocks and rocky reefs.
