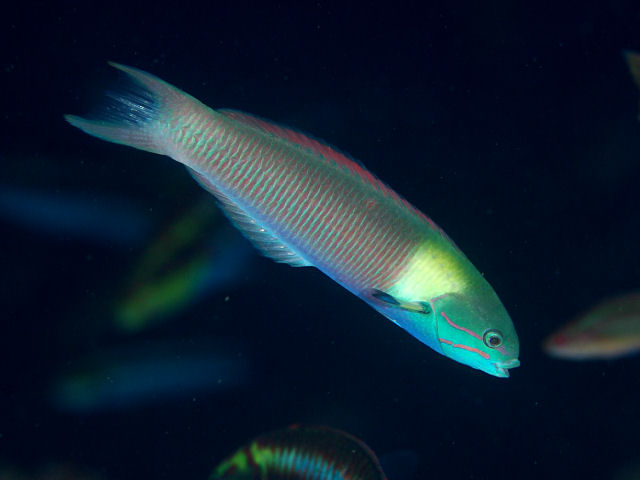

Conservation status
- Least Concern (IUCN 3.1)

Scientific classification
- Kingdom: Animalia
- Phylum: Chordata
- Class: Actinopterygii
- Order: Labriformes
- Family: Labridae
- Genus: Thalassoma
- Species: T. amblycephalum

Binomial name
- Thalassoma amblycephalum (Bleeker, 1856)

Synonyms
- Julis amblycephalus Bleeker, 1856; Julis melanochir Bleeker, 1857; Thalassoma melanochir (Bleeker, 1857); Thalassoma melanochir Fowler, 1904; Pseudojulis trifasciatus M. C. W. Weber, 1913; Pseudojuloides trifasciatus (M. C. W. Weber, 1913)

= Thalassoma amblycephalum =

Species of fish

Thalassoma amblycephalum, the blunt-headed wrasse, blue-headed wrasse, blue-headed zoe, moon wrasse, paddle-fin wrasse or two-tone wrasse, is a species of wrasse native to the Indian Ocean and the western Pacific Ocean. It is a reef inhabitant, being found in schools at depths from 1 to 15 m (3.3 to 49.2 ft). This species can reach 16 cm (6.3 in) in standard length. It can also be found in the aquarium trade.
