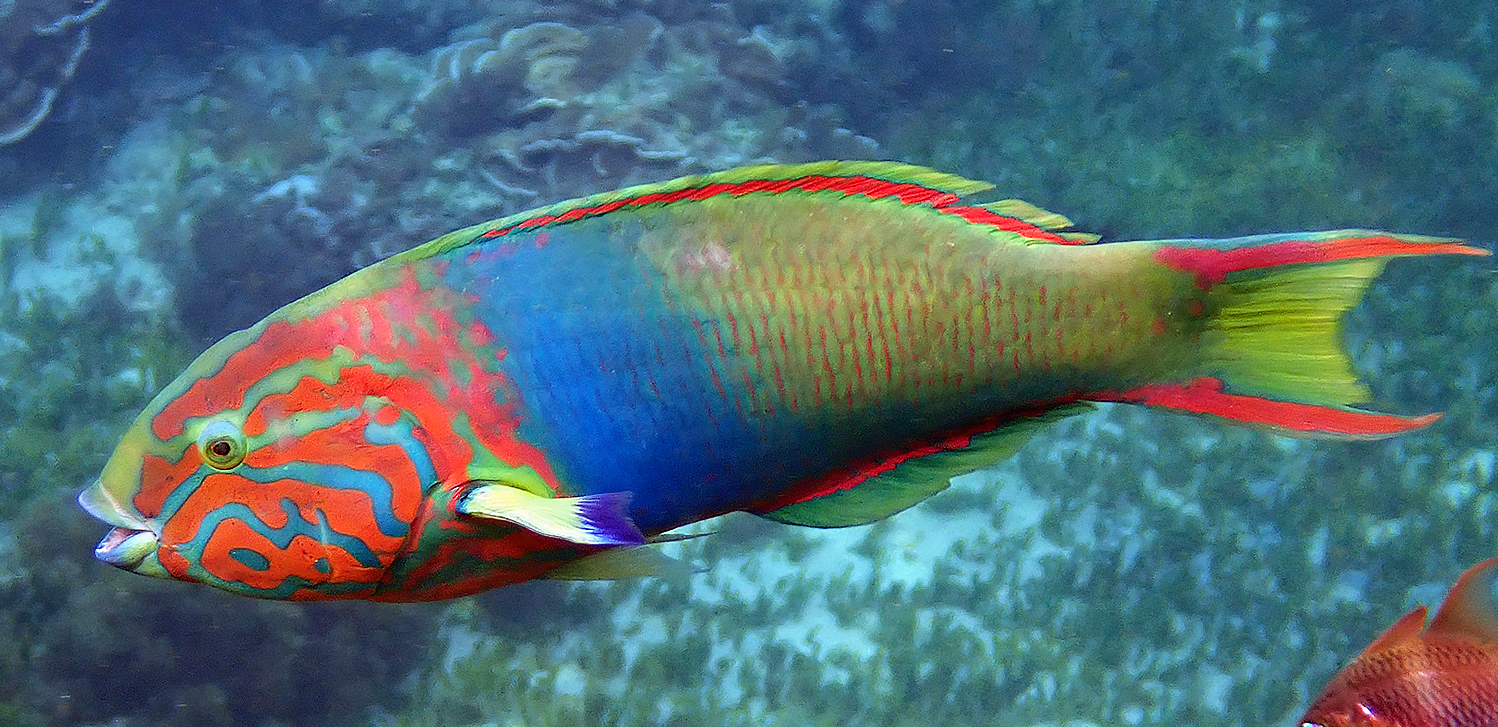
- Male (terminal phase)

Conservation status
- Least Concern (IUCN 3.1)

Scientific classification
- Kingdom: Animalia
- Phylum: Chordata
- Class: Actinopterygii
- Order: Labriformes
- Family: Labridae
- Genus: Thalassoma
- Species: T. lutescens

Binomial name
- Thalassoma lutescens (Lay & E. T. Bennett, 1839)

Synonyms
- Julis lutescens Lay & E. T. Bennett, 1839

= Yellow-brown wrasse =

Species of fish

The yellow-brown wrasse (Thalassoma lutescens) or sunset wrasse is a species of wrasse native to the Indian and Pacific Oceans, where they are found from Sri Lanka to the Hawaiian Islands and from southern Japan to Australia. An inhabitant of coral reefs, it occurs in schools at depths from 1 to 30 m (3.3 to 98.4 ft). It can reach 30 cm (12 in) in total length. This species is of minor importance to local commercial fisheries and can also be found in the aquarium trade.

Growth series

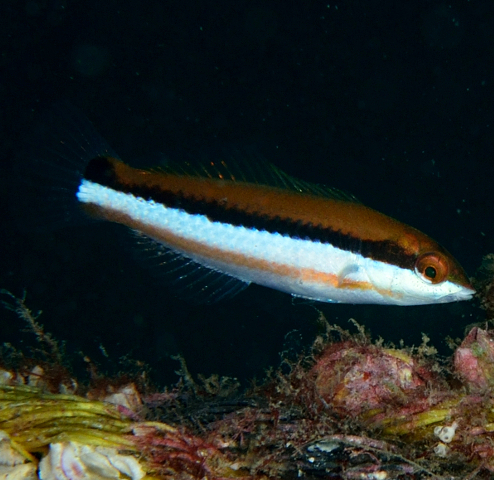
Young juvenile

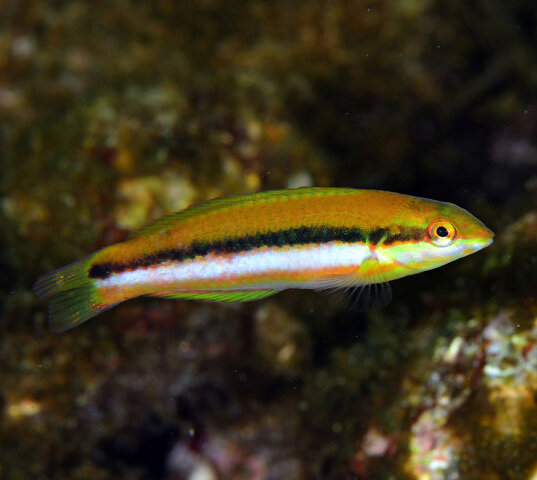
Older juvenile

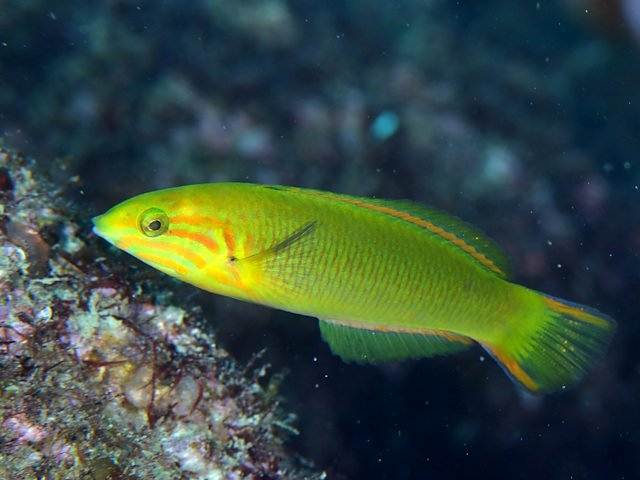
Female

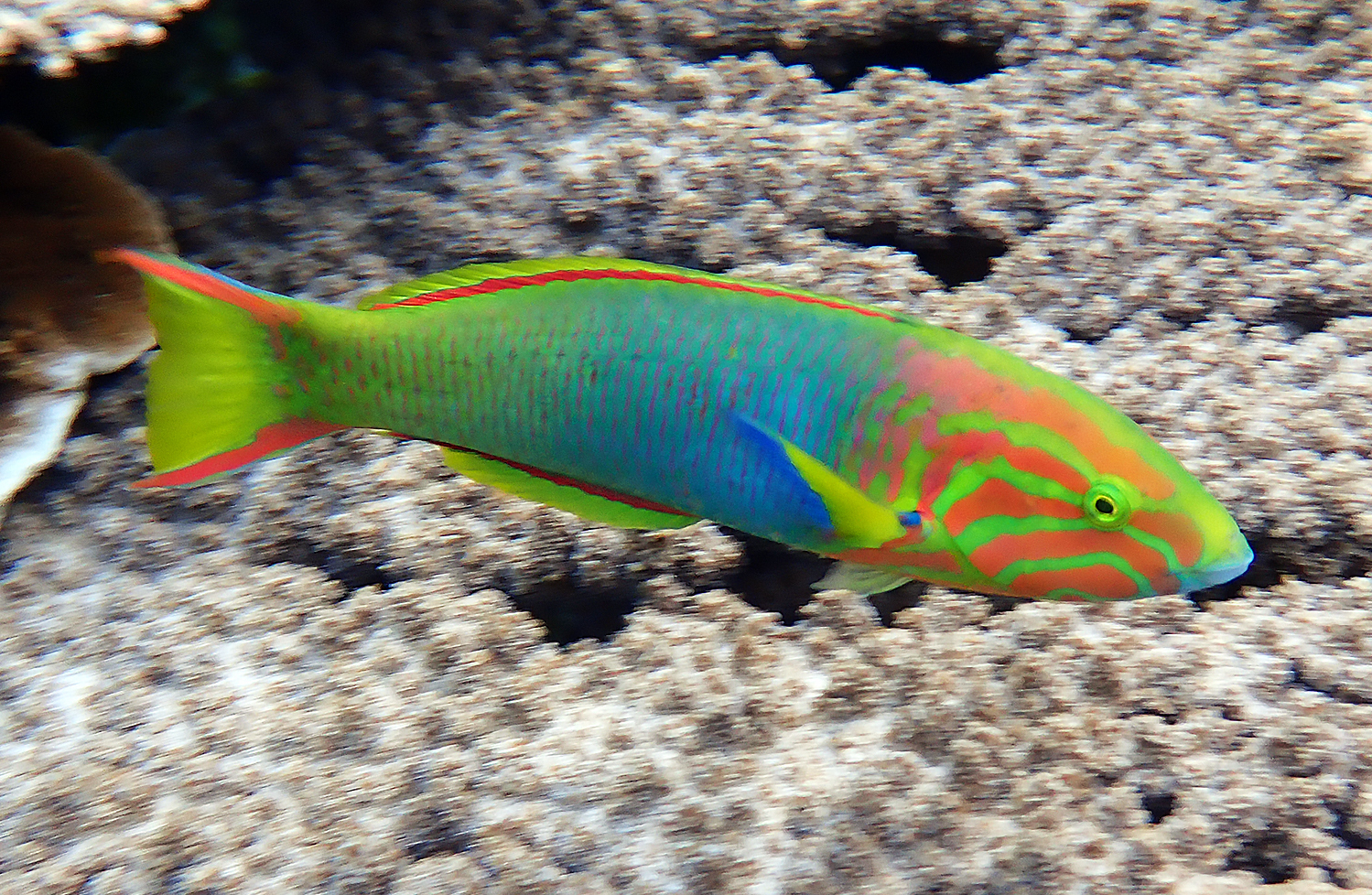
Young male

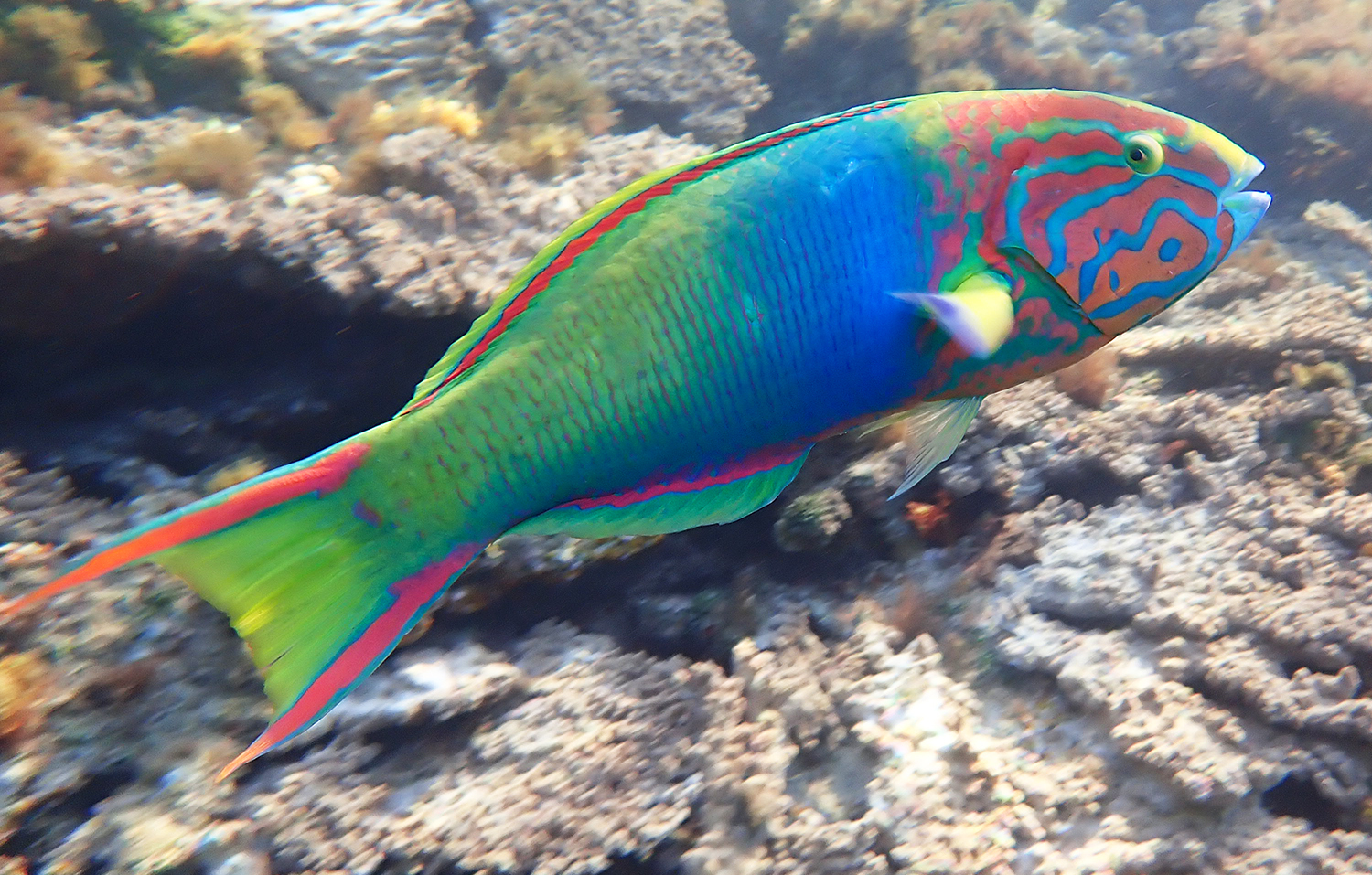
Older male
