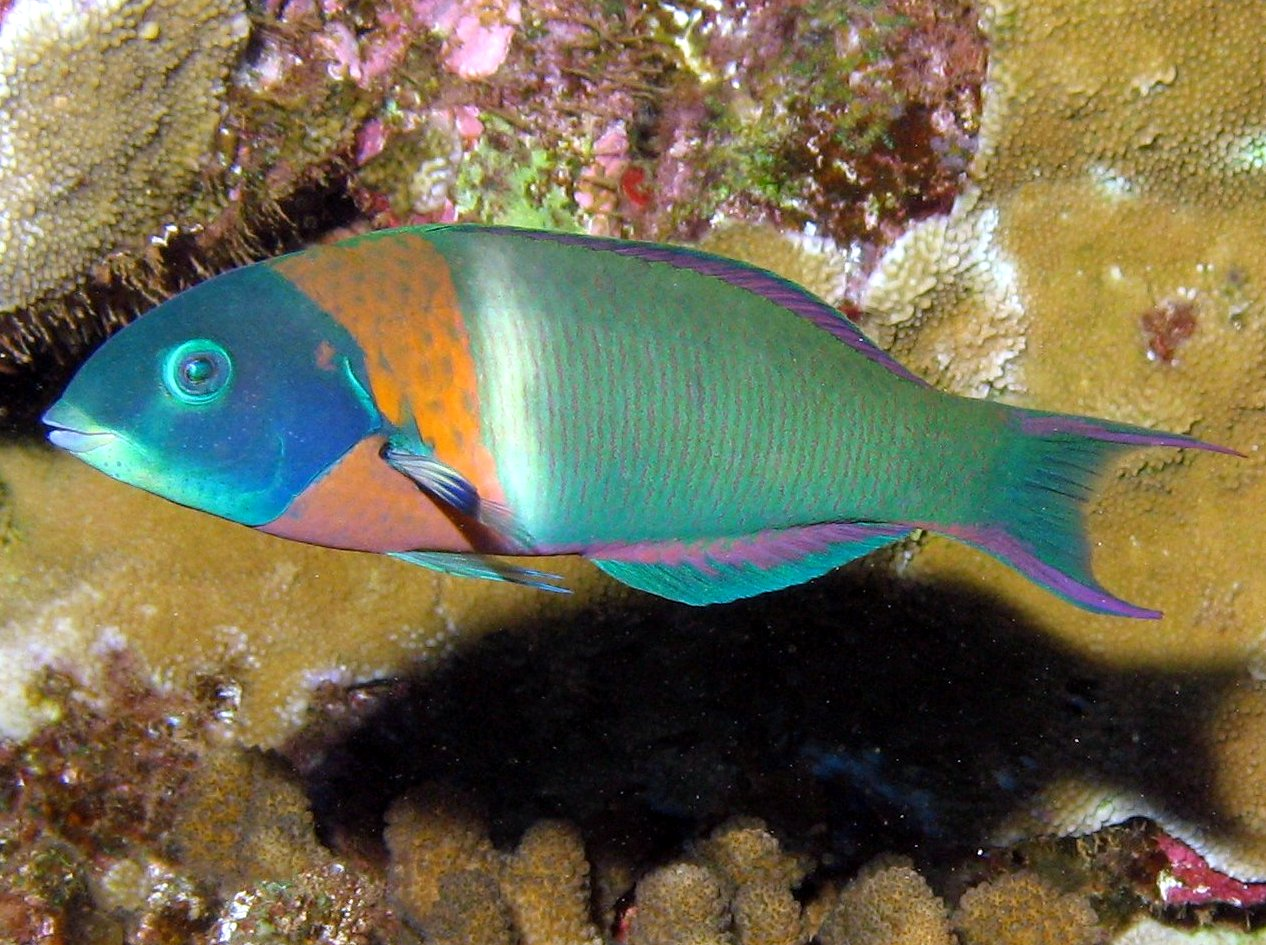

Conservation status
- Least Concern (IUCN 3.1)

Scientific classification
- Kingdom: Animalia
- Phylum: Chordata
- Class: Actinopterygii
- Order: Labriformes
- Family: Labridae
- Genus: Thalassoma
- Species: T. duperrey

Binomial name
- Thalassoma duperrey (Quoy & Gaimard, 1824)

Synonyms
- Julis duperrey Quoy & Gaimard, 1824

= Saddle wrasse =

Species of fish

The saddle wrasse (Thalassoma duperrey), also known as Hīnālea Lauwili in Hawaiʻi, is a species of wrasse native to the waters around the Hawaiian Islands and Johnston Island. They are found on reefs at depths from 5 to 25 m (16 to 82 ft). This species can reach 28 cm (11 in) in total length. This species can also be found in the aquarium trade.

== Description ==
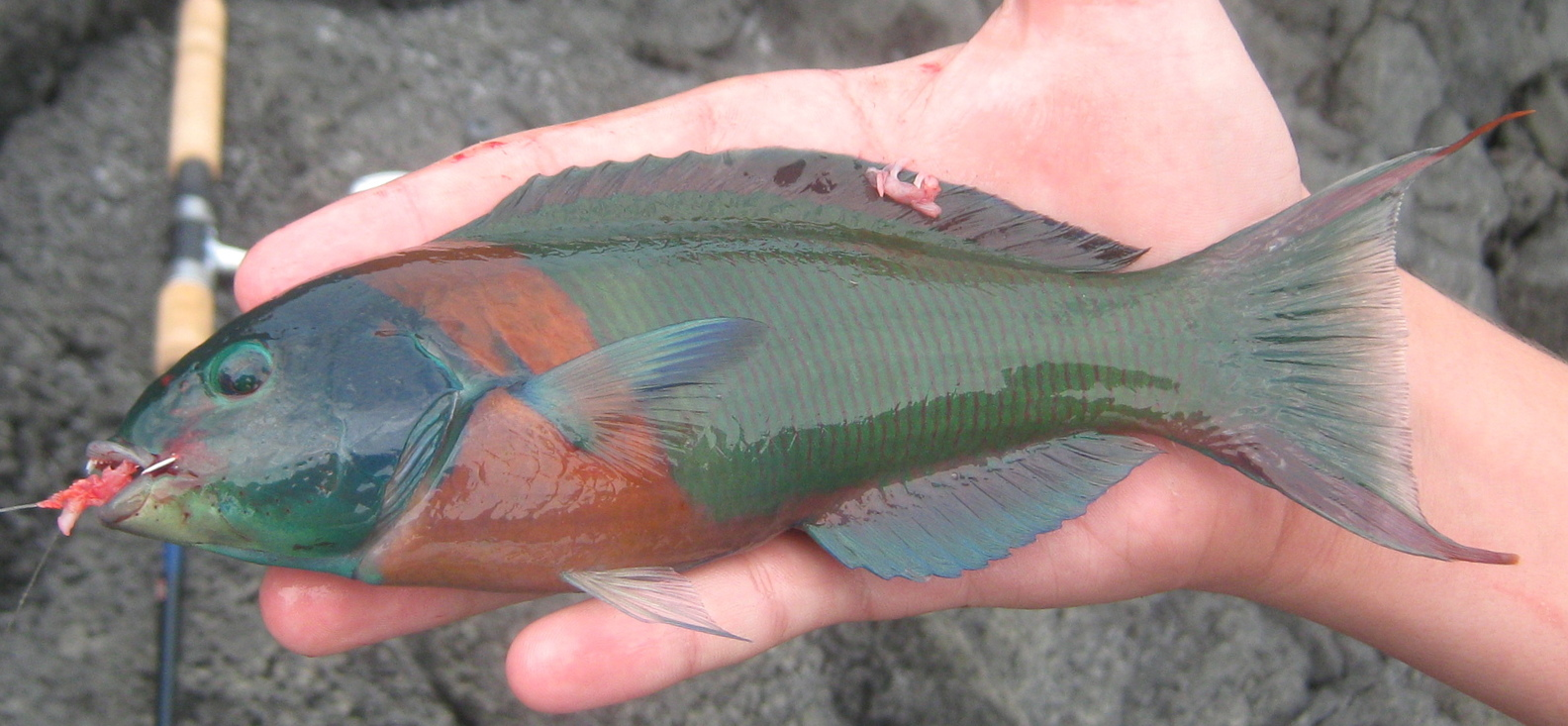
Showing size

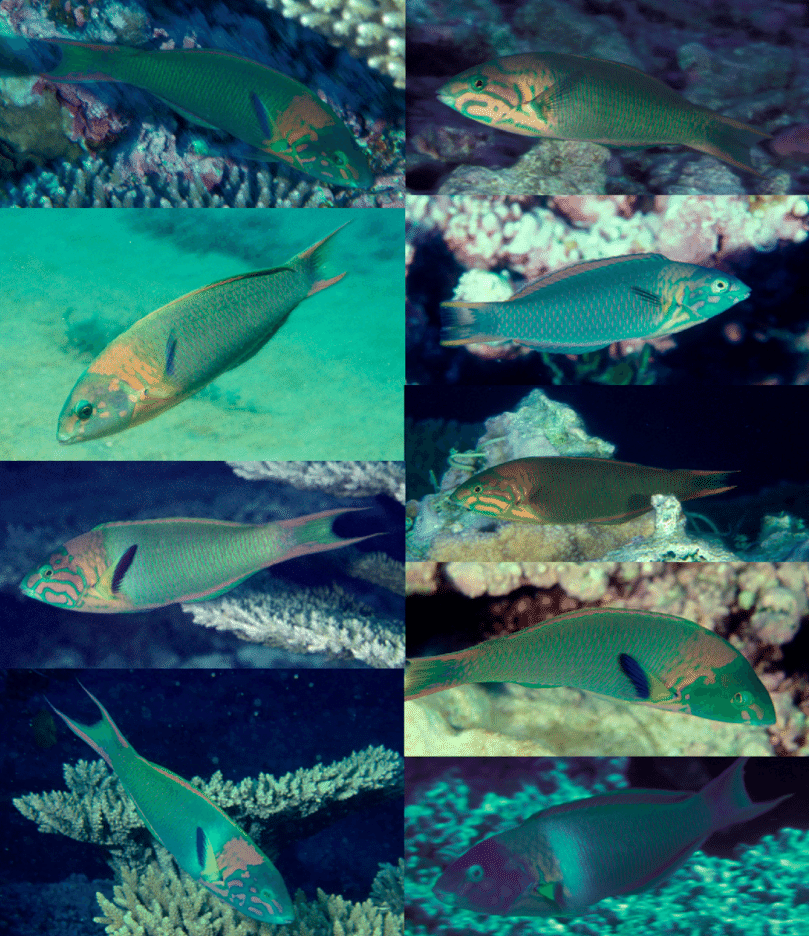
Hybrids (T. duperrey x lutescens), at Johnston Atoll.

Adults of the saddle wrasse have a dark blue-green head followed by a dull orange band that will intensify during the spawning seasons, as for the rest of the body it is blue-green with numerous magenta arrows running down the sides. Terminal males typically have a white bar around the orange band that is able to be turned on or off, as well as a crescent-shaped tail fin. Juveniles tend to be more whitish with a dark stripe that runs from the top of the head to the tail. Smaller adults are able to revert to the juvenile coloration to avoid harassment from larger fish. Saddle wrasses can grow up to 11.5 inches (29.21 cm) in length.

== Distribution and habitat ==
Saddle wrasses are endemic to Hawaii as well as Johnston Atoll, where they are very common.

Saddle wrasses can be found in intertidal and shallow habitats down to about 70 ft (21.34 m) of depth. They are found in areas with a lot of corals, rocks, nooks, and crannies to have a quiet get-away and hiding place from potential threats.

These fish sleep hidden in holes or burrows in sandy areas.

== Diet ==
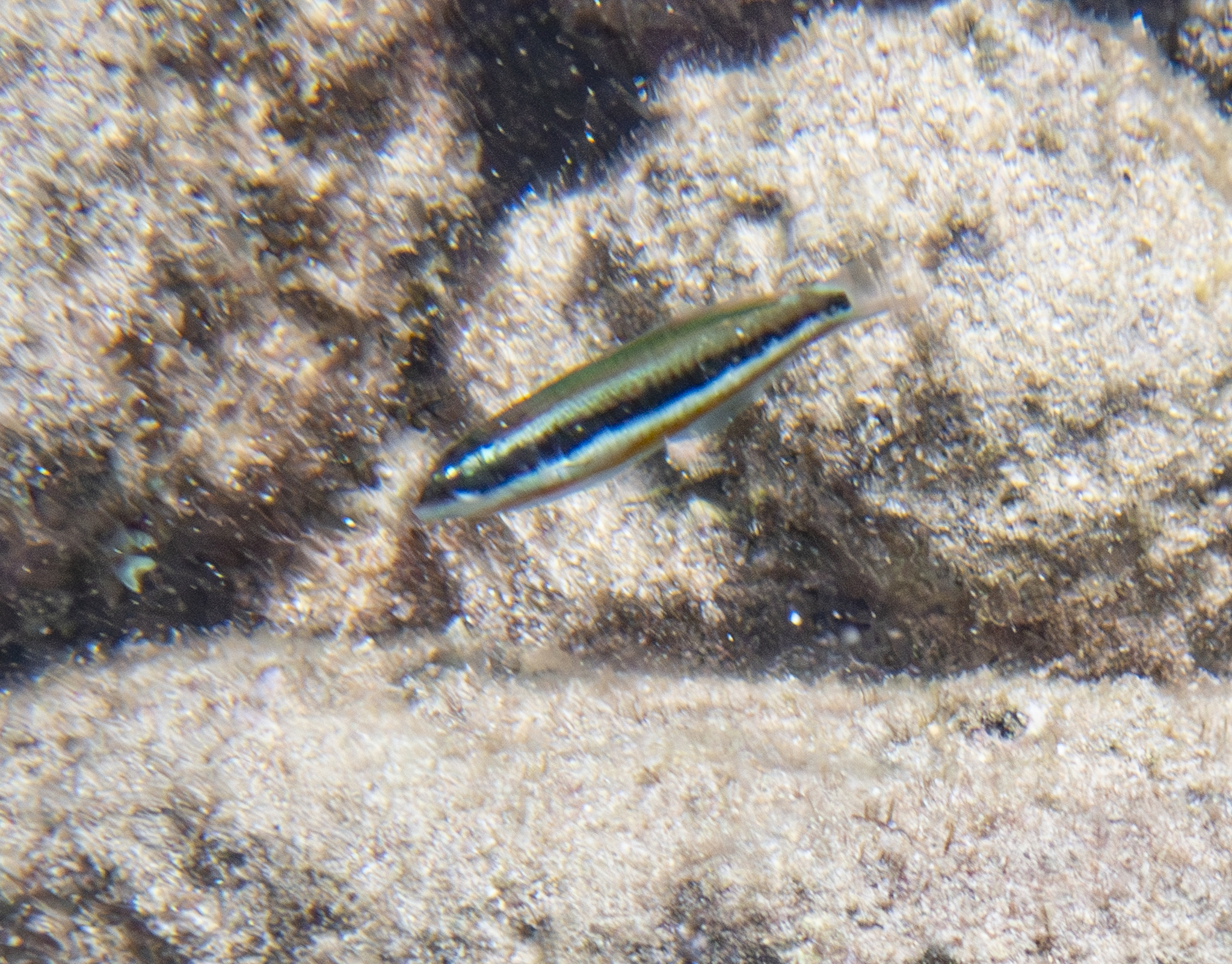
Juvenile

Saddle wrasses are carnivores and opportunistic feeders, consuming anything that will become available to them. As juveniles, they will tend to be considered "cleaners'': such as picking parasites from larger fish or animals, but as they mature they will start to scavenge for worms, shells, mollusks, shrimps, and other crustaceans. They have canine teeth and pharyngeal bones near their gills in order to help crush the shells.

== Human use and cultural significance ==
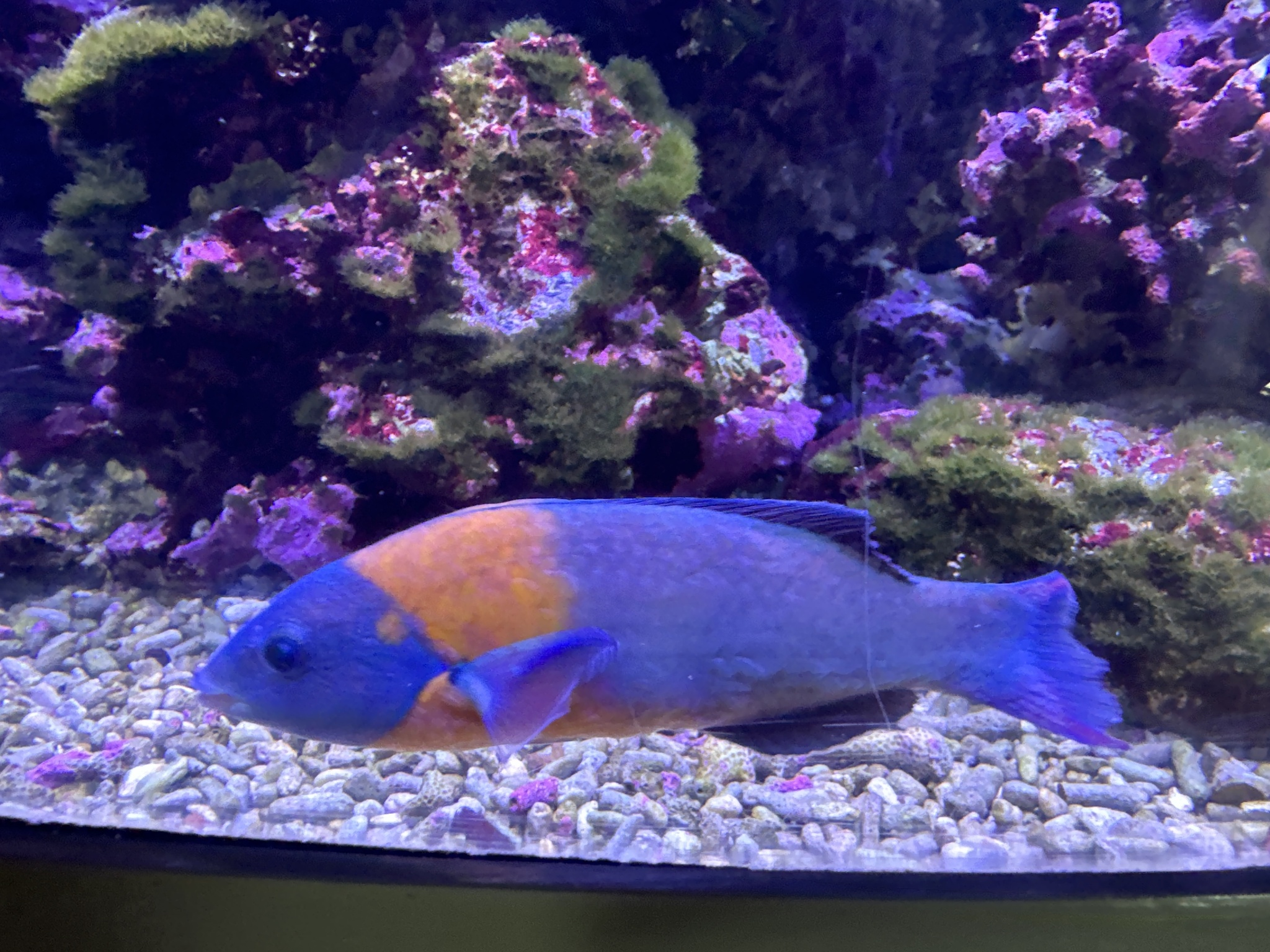
At the Seattle Aquarium

Hīnālea were integral to society and fishing communities in Hawaii as a staple food and regular item in the Hawaiian diet. They were also regularly used in ceremonies and offerings to Hawaiian gods and goddesses. Specific fishing practices include melomelo, where club-like sticks were charred and anointed in oil to attract hīnālea when submerged underwater. Fishermen, or lawai'a, wove baskets, called hīnaʻi hoʻoluʻuluʻu, out of vines of the endemic 'āwikiwiki plant, which then were weighted and dropped into the ocean to trap hīnālea.
