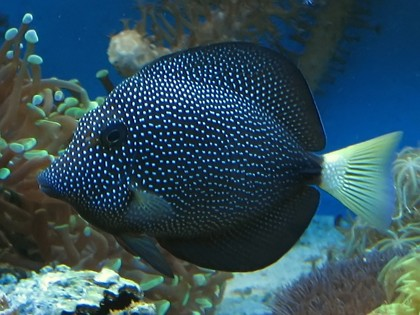

Conservation status
- Data Deficient (IUCN 3.1)

Scientific classification
- Kingdom: Animalia
- Phylum: Chordata
- Class: Actinopterygii
- Order: Acanthuriformes
- Family: Acanthuridae
- Genus: Zebrasoma
- Species: Z. gemmatum

Binomial name
- Zebrasoma gemmatum (Valenciennes, 1835)

Synonyms
- Acanthurus gemmatus Valenciennes, 1835

= Zebrasoma gemmatum =

Species of fish

Zebrasoma gemmatum, the gem tang, jewelled tang, spotted tang or Mauritian tang, is a species of marine ray-finned fish belonging to the family Acanthuridae which includes the surgeonfishes, unicornfishes and tangs. This species is found in the Western Indian Ocean. The spotted tang is a highly prized specimen by marine aquarists and often commands high prices.

== Taxonomy ==
Zebrasoma gemmatum was first formally described as Acanthurus gemmatus in 1835 by the French zoologist Achille Valenciennes with its type locality given as Mauritius. The gem tang is classified in a monospecific clade, less basal than the striped clade, Z. desjardinii and Z. velifer but more so than the other two clades. The genera Zebrasoma and Paracanthurus make up the tribe Zebrasomini within the subfamily Acanthurinae in the family Acanthuridae, according to the 5th edition of Fishes of the World.

== Etymology ==
Zebrasoma gemmatum has the specific name gemmatum, meaning "jewelled", presumed to be an allusion to the many spots on the body.

== Description ==
Zebrasoma gemmatum has its dorsal fin supported by 4 spines and 27 or 28 soft rays while its anal fin is supported by 3 spines and 24 or 25 soft rays. The body is deep, its depth fitting into the standard length 1.6 to 1.9 times. The snout is of medium length with a concave dorsal profile. The high dorsal fin has a longest ray which would fit into the standard length between 2.6 and 3.2 times, with smaller fishes having proportionateley longer rays. The overall colour of this fish is dark brown with a large number of small white spots, these spots are typically round but some may be stretched lengthways, on the head body, anal fin and dorsal fin. The caudal fin is yellow. The maximum published total length of 22 cm (8.7 in).

== Distribution and habitat ==
Zebrasoma gemmatum is endemic to the southwestern Indian Ocean. It has been recorded from South Africa between Kosi Bay and the Eastern Cape, although it has also been recorded from Mozambique. It is also found off Madagascar, the French Southern Territories in the Mozambique Channel, Réunion and Mauritius. This is a rare, territorial species typically found singly on coral reefs in deeper waters down to around 60 m (200 ft), typically deeper than 25 m (82 ft).

== Utilisation and conservation status ==
Zebrasoma gemmatum is highly prized in the aquarium trade and reaches high prices in that trade. For example in 2023 prices per fish are between US$300 and US$3000. The IUCN assess the conservation status of the gem tang as Data Deficient as very little is known about its biology or how the harvest for the aquarium trade affects the population.
