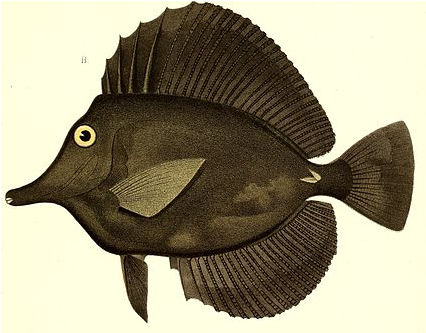

Conservation status
- Data Deficient (IUCN 3.1)

Scientific classification
- Kingdom: Animalia
- Phylum: Chordata
- Class: Actinopterygii
- Division: Teleostei
- Order: Acanthuriformes
- Family: Acanthuridae
- Genus: Zebrasoma
- Species: Z. rostratum

Binomial name
- Zebrasoma rostratum (Günther, 1875)

Synonyms
- Acanthurus rostratus Günther, 1875

= Zebrasoma rostratum =

Species of fish

Zebrasoma rostratum, the longnose surgeonfish, longnose tang or black tang, is a species of marine ray-finned fish belonging to the family Acanthuridae, which includes the surgeonfishes, unicornfishes and tangs. This fish is found in the western central Pacific Ocean.

== Taxonomy ==
Zebrasoma rostratum was first formally described as Acanthurus rostratus in 1875 by the German-born British ichthyologist Albert Günther with its type locality given as the Society Islands in French Polynesia. The longnose tang is part of a species pair within the genus Zebrasoma, along with the purple tang (Z. xanthurum). The genera Zebrasoma and Paracanthurus make up the tribe Zebrasomini within the subfamily Acanthurinae in the family Acanthuridae, according to the 5th edition of Fishes of the World.

== Etymology ==
Zebrasoma rostratum has the specific name rostratum, meaning "beaked", a reference to the longer snout of this species relative to the yellow tang (Z. flavescens).

== Description ==
Zebrasoma rostratum has its dorsal fin supported by 4 or 5 spines and between 23 and 28 soft rays while its anal fin is supported by 3 spines and 19 to 24 soft rays.% The body is laterally compressed, its depth fitting into its standard length around twice, and a protruding, relatively long snout. The overall colour is black with a white patch around the spine on the caudal peduncle. There is a patch of bristles to the front of the spine in males. The juveniles are not uniformly black, they are grey towards the head and black on the rear. The longnose tang has a maximum published total length of 21 cm (8.3 in).

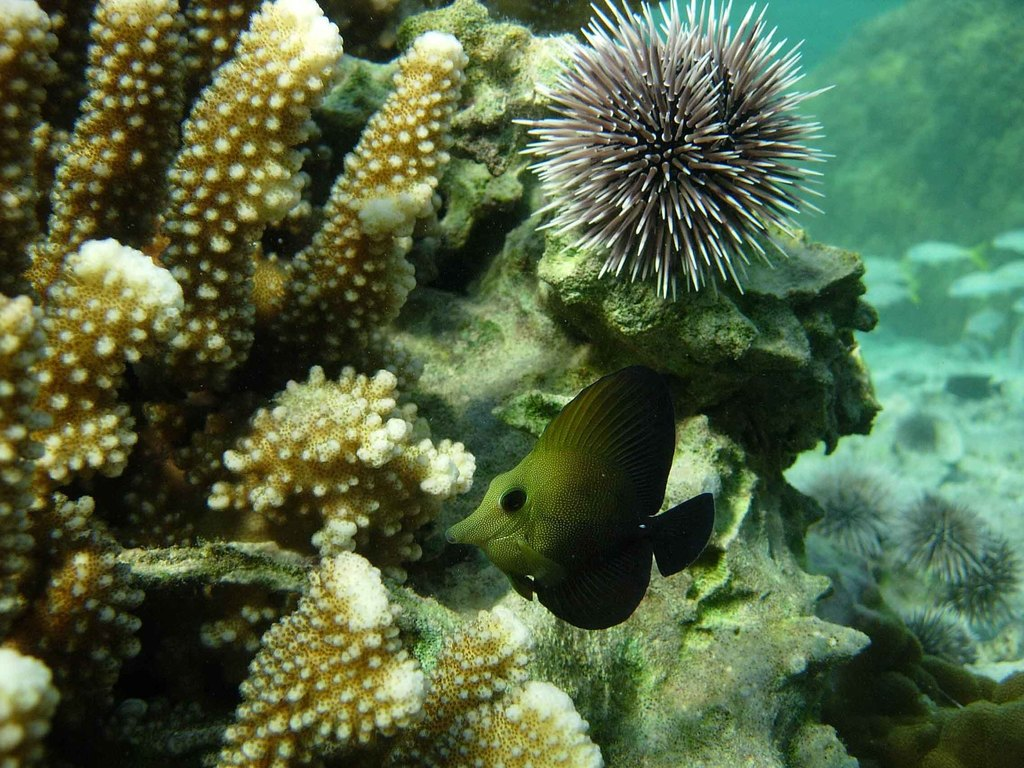
Juvenile

== Distribution and habitat ==
Zebrasoma rostratum is found in the central Pacific Ocean. It ranges from Tuvalu east to Pitcairn including all of French Polynesia, north to the Line Islands and south to Rapa Iti. A vagrant has been recorded off Oahu in Hawaii. This is a benthopelagic species found at depths between 8 and 35 m (26 and 115 ft) on lagoon and seaward reefs.

== Conservation ==
Zebrasoma rostratum is an uncommon species throughout its range but is a sought after aquarium fish. The lack of information on the impact on the population of collecting for the aquarium trade and on this fish's biology has led the IUCN to assess its status and data deficient.
