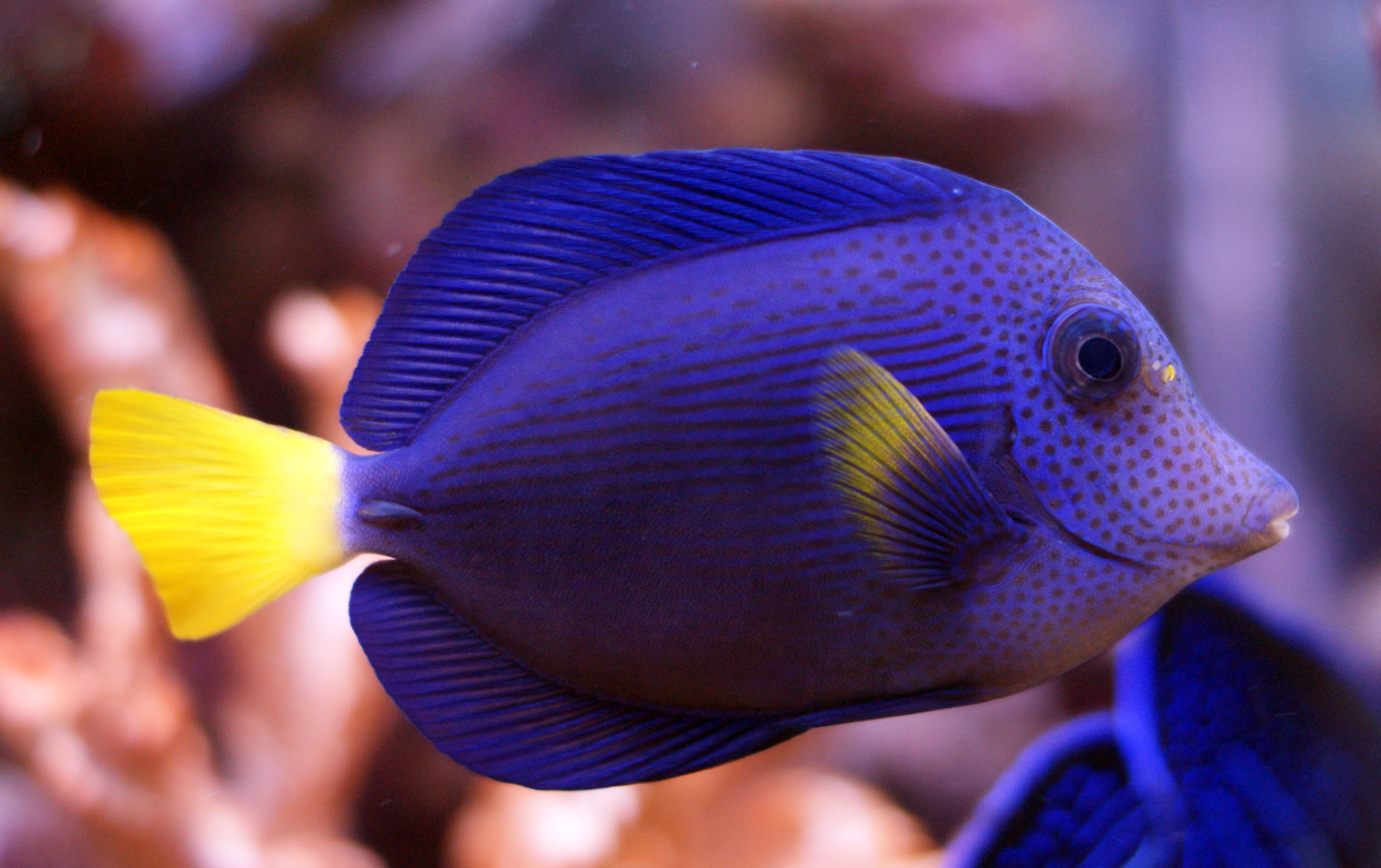

Conservation status
- Least Concern (IUCN 3.1) (Global)

- Vulnerable (IUCN 3.1) (Persian Gulf)

Scientific classification
- Kingdom: Animalia
- Phylum: Chordata
- Class: Actinopterygii
- Division: Teleostei
- Order: Acanthuriformes
- Family: Acanthuridae
- Genus: Zebrasoma
- Species: Z. xanthurum

Binomial name
- Zebrasoma xanthurum (Blyth, 1852)

Synonyms
- Acanthurus xanthurus Blyth, 1852

= Zebrasoma xanthurum =

Species of fish

Zebrasoma xanthurum, the purple tang or yellowtail tang, is a species of marine ray-finned fish belonging to the family Acanthuridae which includes the surgeonfishes, unicornfishes and tangs. This species is endemic to the north western Indian Ocean.

== Taxonomy ==
Zebrasoma xanthurum was first formally described as Acanthurus xanthurus in 1852 by the English zoologist Edward Blyth with its type locality given as Sri Lanka. However, this species has not reliably been recorded in Sri Lanka since Blyth's description and the type locality may be erroneous. The yellowtail tang is part of a species pair within the genus Zebrasoma, along with the longnose tang (Z. rostratum). The genera Zebrasoma and Paracanthurus make up the tribe Zebrasomini within the subfamily Acanthurinae in the family Acanthuridae, according to the 5th edition of Fishes of the World.

== Etymology ==
Zebrasoma xanthurum has the specific name xanthurum, meaning "yellow tail", a reference to the yellow caudal fin of this species.

== Description ==
Zebrasoma xanthurum has its dorsal fin supported by 5 spines and 24 or 25 soft rays while the anal fin is supported by 3 spines and 19 or 20 soft rays. This species has a deep laterally compressed body, a protruding snout and high dorsal and anal fins. The depth of the body fits 1.7 to 1.9 times into its standard length while the longest dorsal fin ray fits 3.3 to 3.7 times into the standard length. The snout has a concave profile on both the upper and lower sides. There is a velvet-like patch of bristles on the caudal peduncle anterior to the spine. The juveniles have a rounded caudal fin but in adults it may be slightly rounded or truncate. The head and body of adults are dark blue to purple, contrasting with the bright yellow caudal fin. The head and anterior part of the body are marked with black spots and these extend onto the adjacent fins. There are irregular black horizontal lines on the rest of the body and fins apart from the caudal fin and the pectoral fins have the outer third coloured yellow. Juveniles and subadults have dark brown longitudinal lines on their bodies. The yellowtail tang has a maximum published total length of 36.7 cm (14.4 in), although a total length of 10 cm (3.9 in) is more typical.

== Distribution and habitat ==
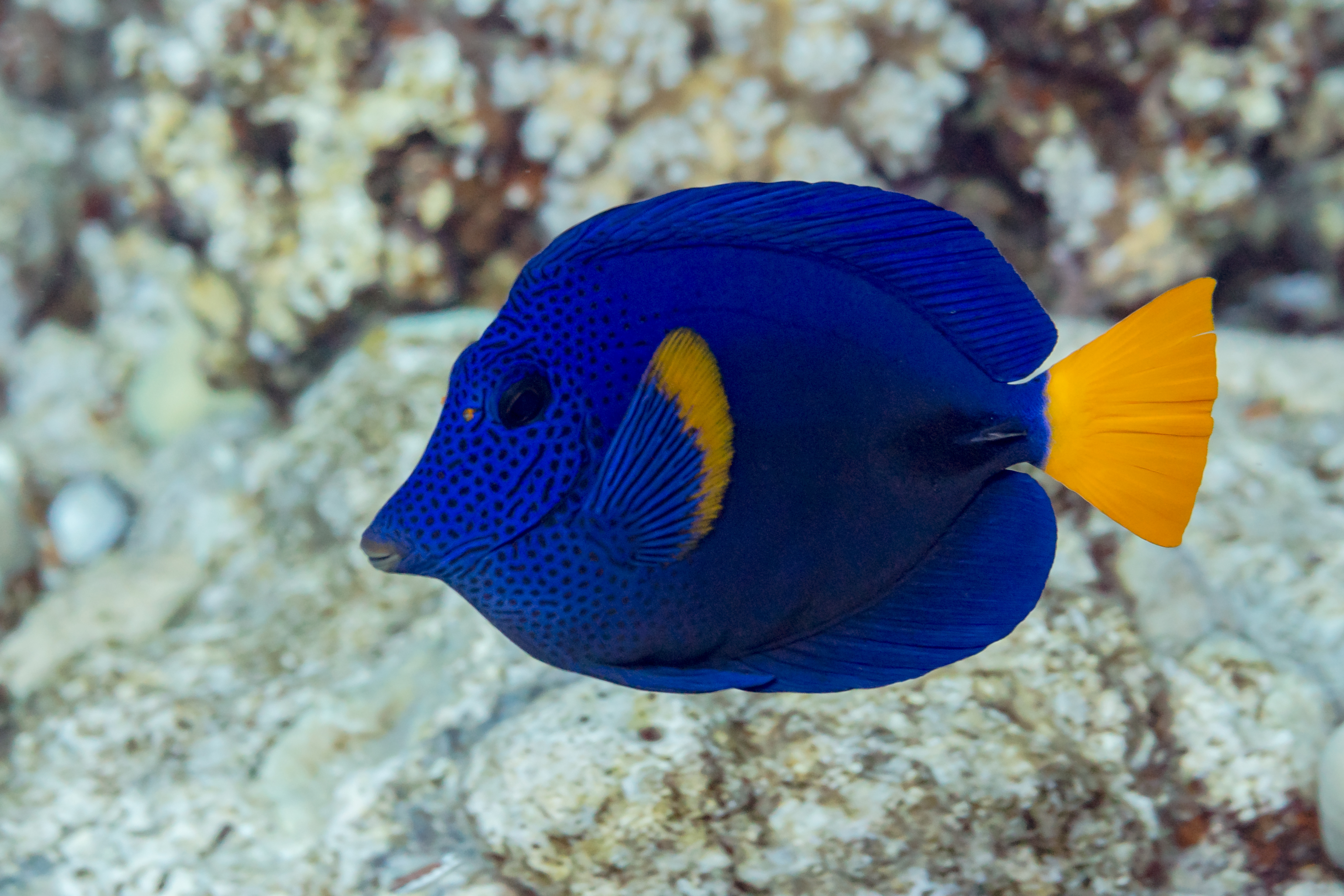
In the Red Sea

Zebrasoma xanthurum is endemic to the north western Indian Ocean where it is found in the Red Sea and the Gulf of Aden and around the coasts of the Arabian Peninsula into the Persian Gulf. It is also found around Socotra. A record from Sardinia in 2015 is thought to be an aquarium release. A record from the Maldives is thought to be a misidentification and the type locality of Sri Lanka is thought to be an error. These fishes are found in groups at depths down to 20 m (66 ft) over coral rich or rocky areas.

== Biology ==
Zebrasoma xanthurum is a herbivorous grazer of filamentous algae. They follow a daily pattern of feeding in single individuals or pairs during the day and at sunset they stop feeding and move into their shelter for the night among corals or in crevices. The juveniles are cryptic and hide among coral.

== Conservation status ==
Zebrasoma xanthurum is a minor item in the aquarium trade. The IUCN assess its conservation status on a global level as Least Concern, but in the Persian Gulf it has a small area of suitable habitat that is subject to destruction by coastal development and is assessed as Vulnerable.
