= Z. flavescens =

Z. flavescens may refer to:

- Zebrasoma flavescens, a saltwater fish
- Zonosaurus flavescens, a plated lizard
