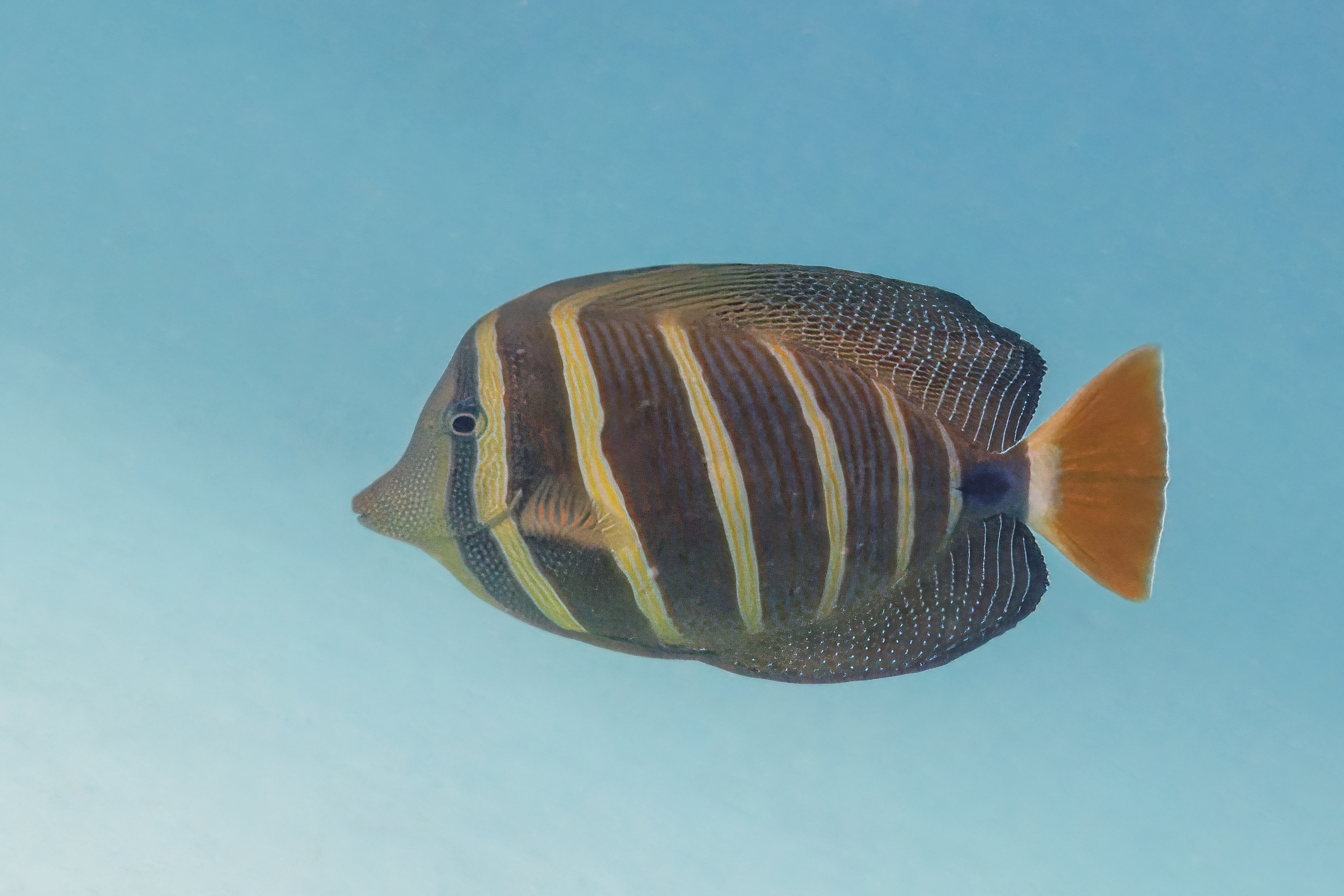

Conservation status
- Least Concern (IUCN 3.1)

Scientific classification
- Kingdom: Animalia
- Phylum: Chordata
- Class: Actinopterygii
- Order: Acanthuriformes
- Family: Acanthuridae
- Genus: Zebrasoma
- Species: Z. velifer

Binomial name
- Zebrasoma velifer (Bloch, 1795)

Synonyms
- Acanthurus velifer Bloch, 1795

= Sailfin tang =

Species of fish

The sailfin tang (Zebrasoma velifer), the Pacific sailfin tang, purple sailfinned tang or sailfin surgeonfish, is a marine ray-finned fish belonging to the family Acanthuridae which includes the surgeonfishes, unicornfishes and tangs. This fish is found in the Pacific Ocean and is popular in the aquarium hobby.

== Taxonomy ==
The sailfin tang was first formally described as Acanthurus velifer in 1795 by the German naturalist Marcus Elieser Bloch with its type locality given as Tranquebar in Bloch and Schneider 1801. When William Swainson proposed the new genus Zebrasoma in 1839 he classified Bloch's Acanthurus velifer as the only species in the genus, it is therefore the type species of Zebrasoma by monotypy. The sailfin tang and the Indian sailfin tang *Z, desjardinii are closely related, and have been regarded as conspecific in the past, and form a species pair which is basal to the genus Zebrasoma. The genera Zebrasoma and Paracanthurus make up the tribe Zebrasomini within the subfamily Acanthurinae in the family Acanthuridae, according to the 5th edition of Fishes of the World.

== Etymology ==
Zebrasoma velifer has the specific name velifer, which is a combination of velo, meaning "sail", and fero, meaning "to bear", a reference to the high dorsal fin. Many authors give the name as veliferum but it is a noun in apposition so velifer is correct.

== Description ==
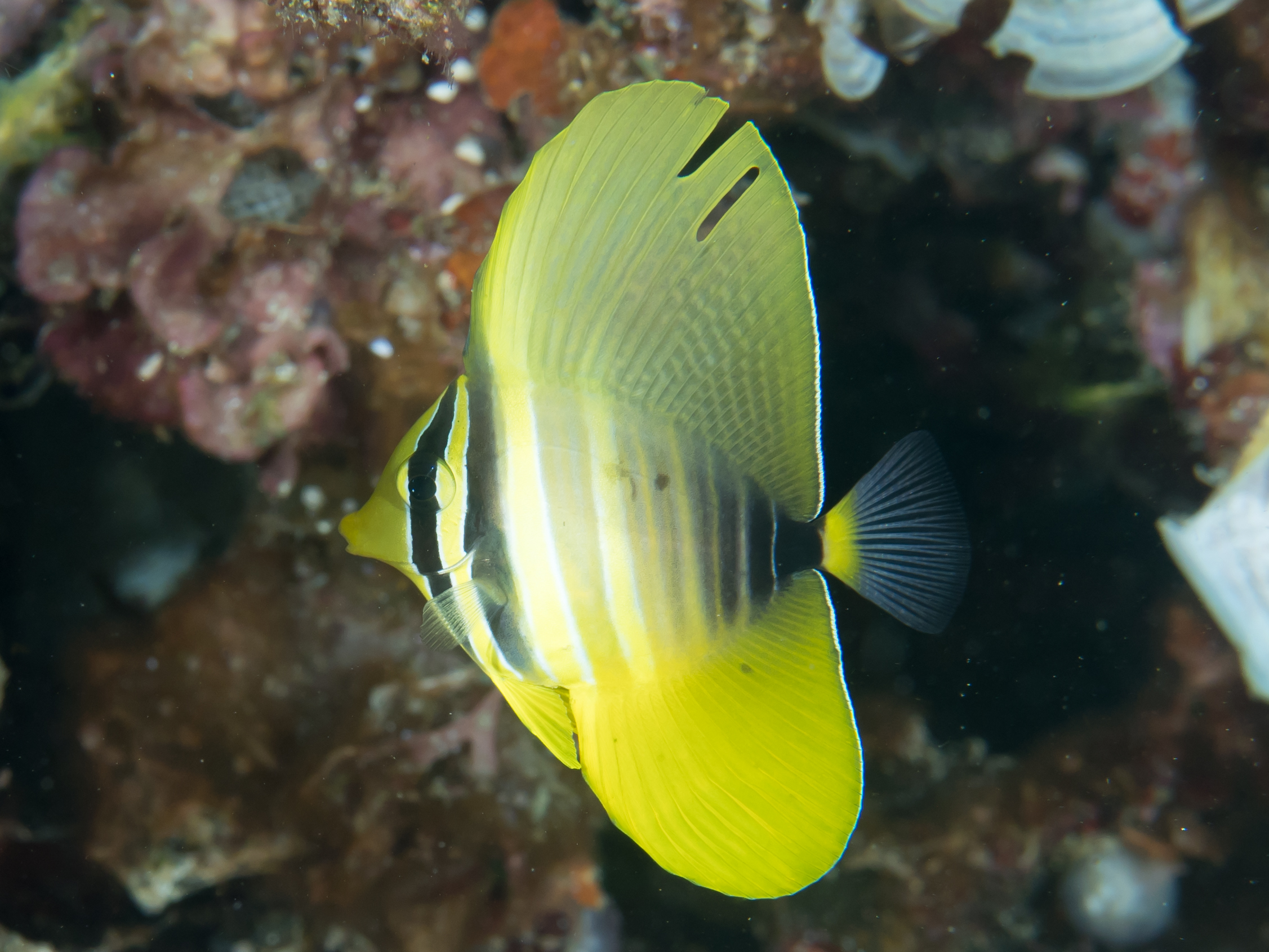
Juvenile

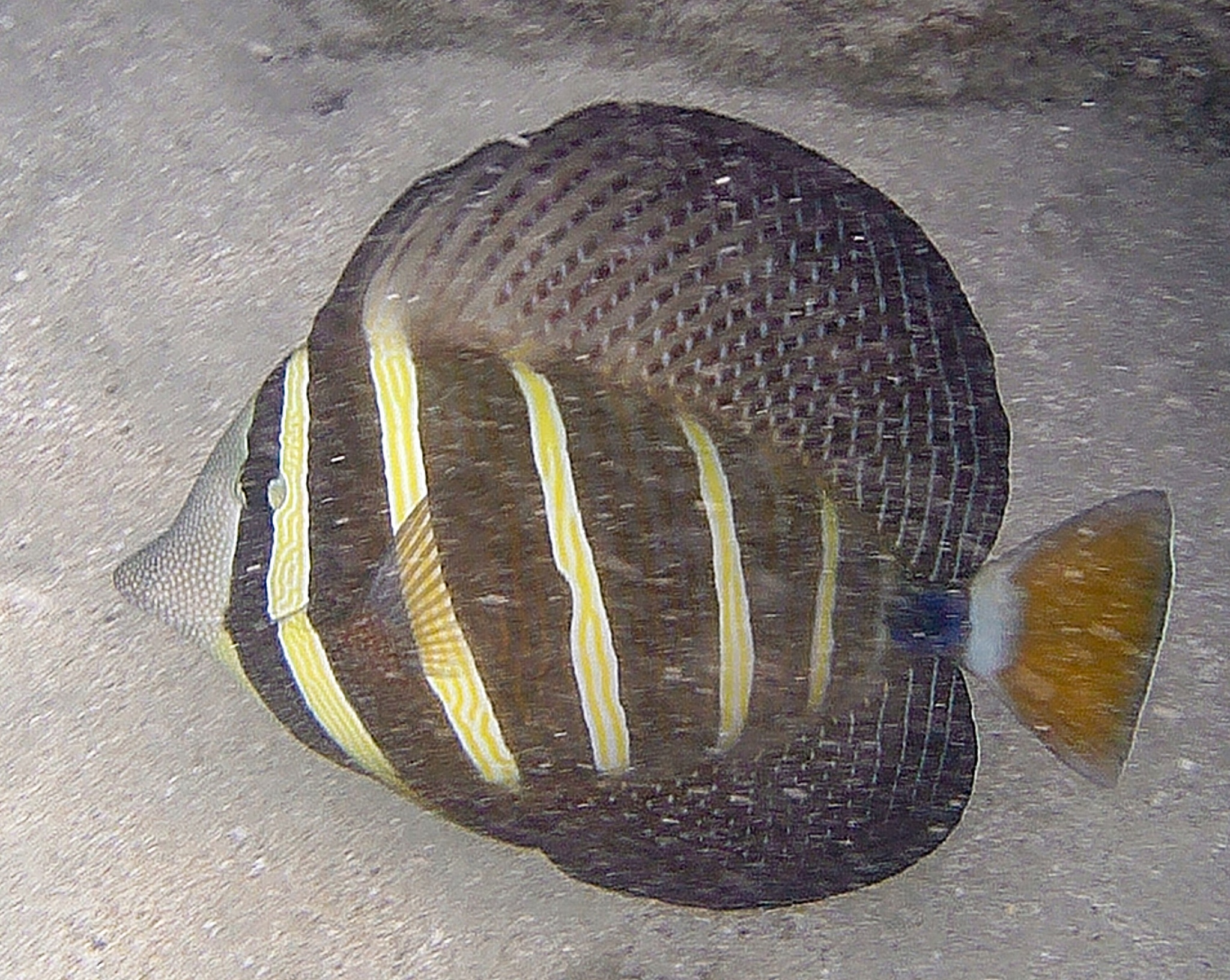
Adult

The sailfin tang has its dorsal fin supported by 4 or 5 spines and between 29 and 33 soft rays while its anal fin is supported by 3 spins and 23 to 26 soft rays. It has a disc shaped body with very high dorsal and anal fins and when its fins are fully extended, the total height of the fish is almost equal to its length. It also has the elongated snout typical of Zebrasoma. This is a brownish coloured fish marked with wide greyish brown bars separated by narrower yellow bars. The dorsal and anal fins are dark greyish to brown marked with paler bands. The caudal fin varies in colour from greyish brown to yellow. The white head is covered with yellow spots and there is a dark band running though the eye with the a second slightly paler band immediately to the rear of the eye. The bands on the head are also marked with yellow dots and lines. Juvenile specimens look similar to the adult fish, but with more yellow colouring. This species has a maximum published standard length of 40 cm (16 in).

== Distribution and habitat ==
The sailfin tang is found in the Pacific Ocean. The westernmost occurrence is around Christmas Island, in the eastern Indian Ocean, and the eastern coast of Indo-China and it extends eastwards into the Pacific as far as the Pitcairn Islands and Hawaii, including the Northwestern Hawaiian islands, north to Japan and south to Australia and Rapa Iti. It is absent from the Marquesas Islands. In Australia this species is found at Rottnest Island to the Montebello Islands and around offshore reefs in Western Australia; Ashmore reef in the Timor Sea, the northern Great Barrier Reef south to Moreton Bay in Queensland, although juveniles reach Sydney. They are also found off Middleton Reef, Elizabeth Reef and Lord Howe Island. The sailfin tang is benthopelagic and is found at depths down to 45 m (148 ft) on lagoon and seaward reefs. The juveniles are solitary and occur on coral and rocky sheltered reefs, although they may sometimes be found in turbid areas.

== Biology ==
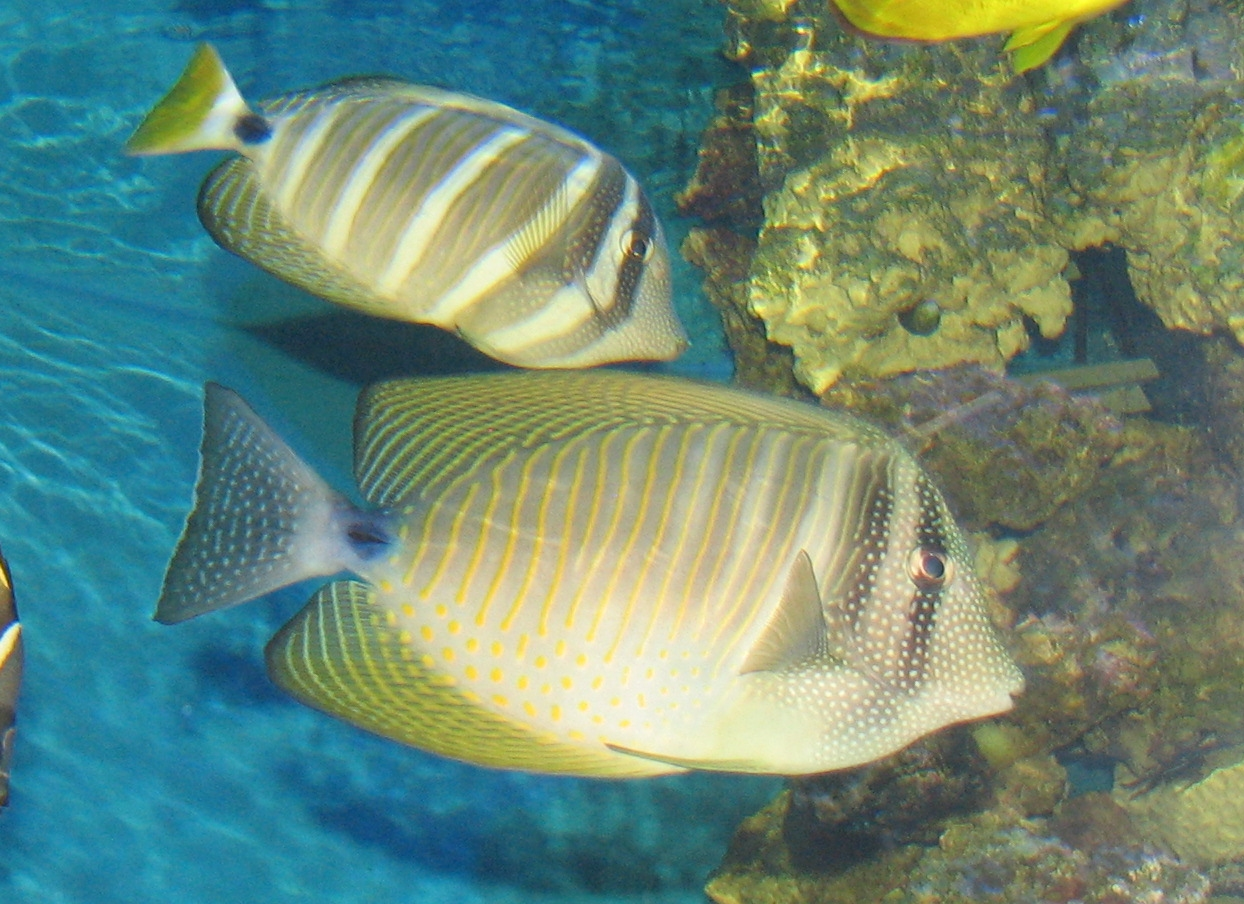
Z. velifer (top) compared to Z. desjardinii (bottom)

The sailfin tang is typically solitary, although they may be found in pairs. They graze on leafy algae. When compared to the less basal Zebrasoma species they have less well developed pharyngeal teeth. They are diurnal and courtship and spawning take place in the early afternoon following an ebbing tide.

== Utilisation ==
The sailfin tang is caught as a food fish, in Guam fishers use spears and fish traps. As it is larger than the sympatric congeners the yellow tang (Z. flavescens) and the twotone tang (Z. scopas), it is of greater value as a food fish. This species has a viable tolerance to copper based medications and can be kept in systems that employ these anti-parasitic techniques, and is also traded in the aquarium trade.
