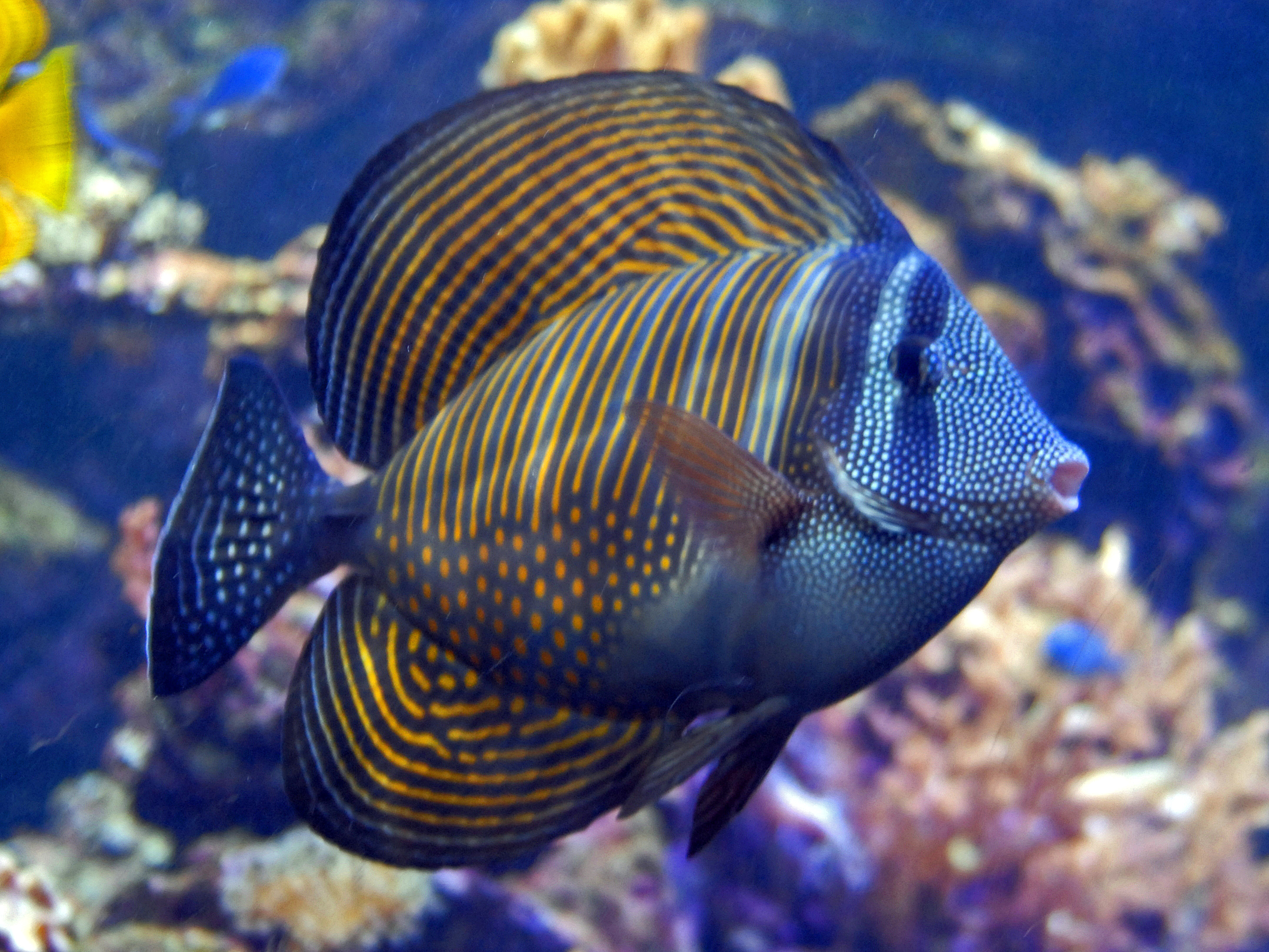
- Displaying dorsal and anal fins

Conservation status
- Least Concern (IUCN 3.1)

Scientific classification
- Kingdom: Animalia
- Phylum: Chordata
- Class: Actinopterygii
- Order: Acanthuriformes
- Family: Acanthuridae
- Genus: Zebrasoma
- Species: Z. desjardinii

Binomial name
- Zebrasoma desjardinii (Bennett, 1836)

Synonyms
- Acanthurus desjardinii Bennett, 1836; Zebrasoma desjardini (Bennett, 1836)

= Zebrasoma desjardinii =

Species of fish

Zebrasoma desjardinii, commonly known as the Red Sea sailfin tang, Desjardin's sailfin tang or the Indian sailfin tang, is a species of marine ray-finned fish in the family Acanthuridae (the surgeonfishes, unicornfishes and tangs). It is found in the Indian Ocean.

== Taxonomy ==
Zebrasoma desjardinii was first formally described in 1836 as Acanthurus desjardinii by the English zoologist Edward Turner Bennett with its type locality given as Mauritius. This taxon was once treated as a subspecies of the visually similar Zebrasoma velifer, but now they are again regarded as separate.

The genera Zebrasoma and Paracanthurus together make up the tribe Zebrasomini, which is placed in the subfamily Acanthurinae of the family Acanthuridae, according to the 5th edition of Fishes of the World.

== Etymology ==
The specific name of Zebrasoma desjardinii honors the French zoologist Julien Desjardins; he lived for a number of years in Mauritius and donated a collection of fishes to the British Museum of Natural History, including the type of this species.

== Description ==
Growth series

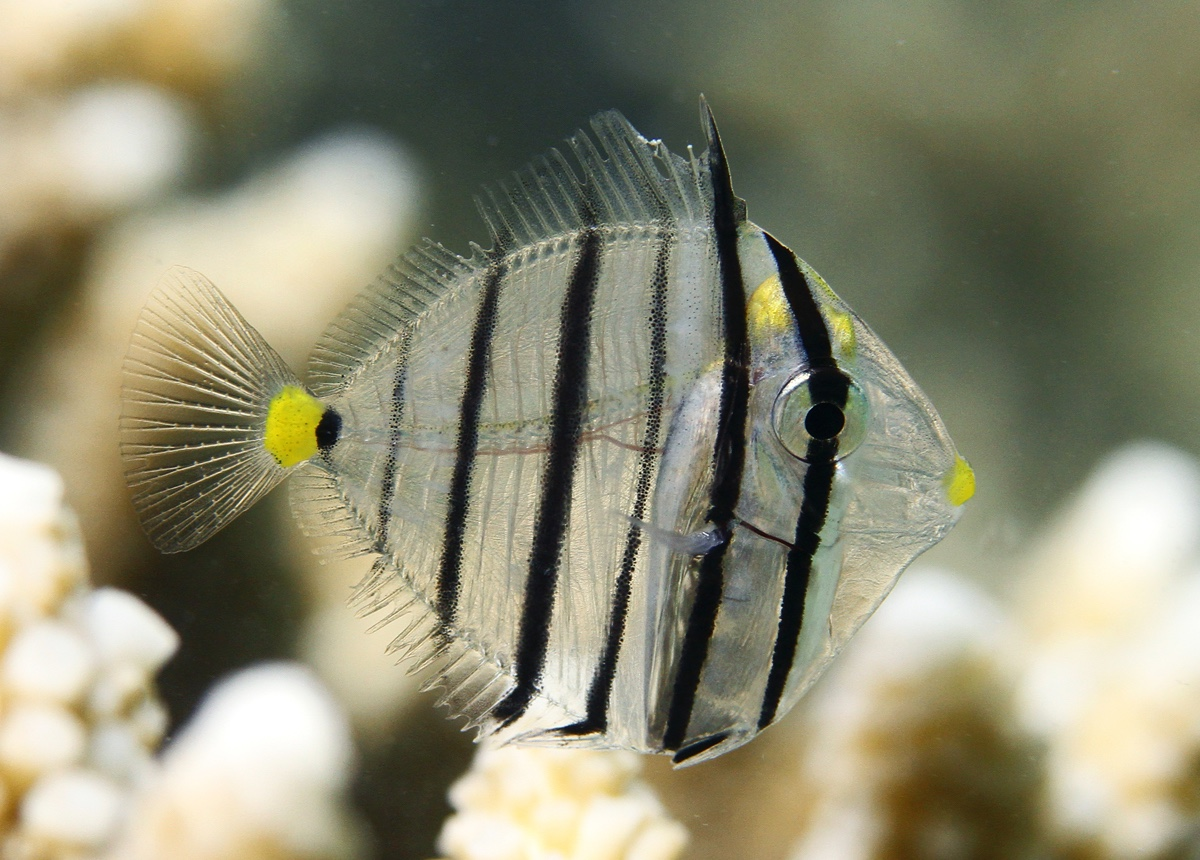
Post-larval

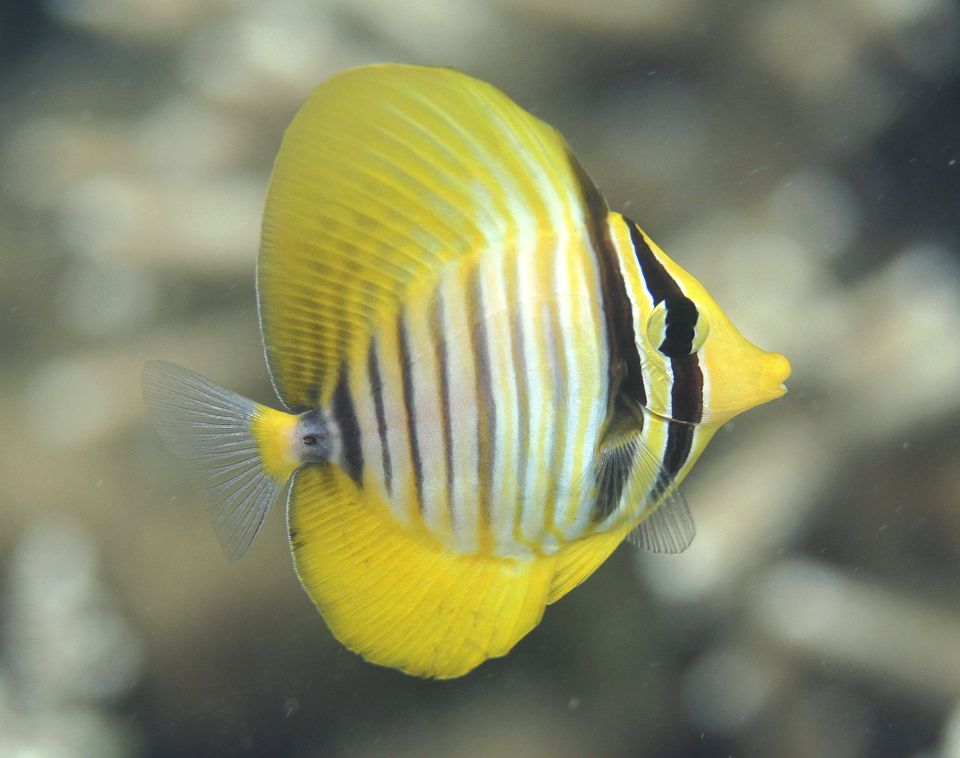
Juvenile

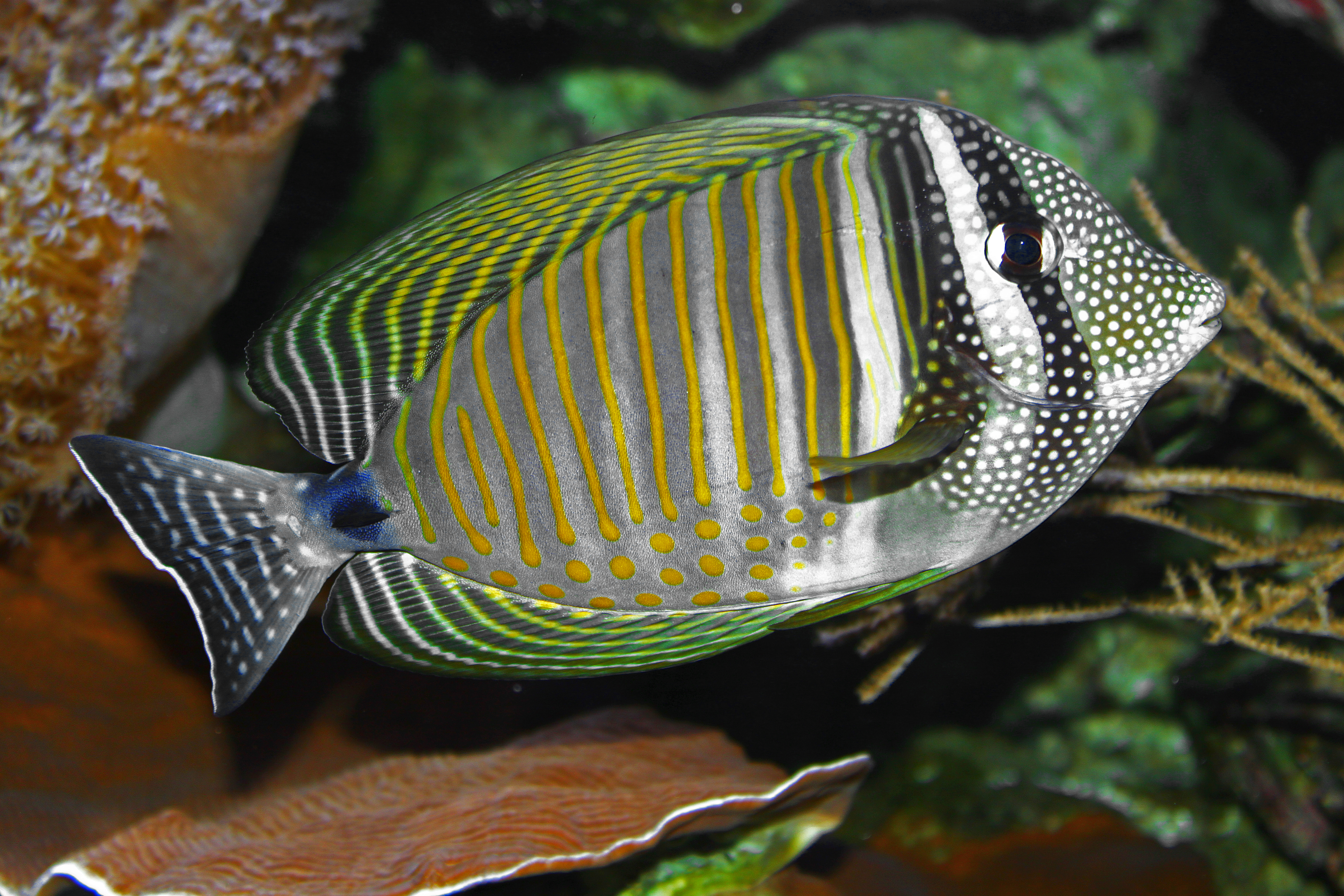
Adult

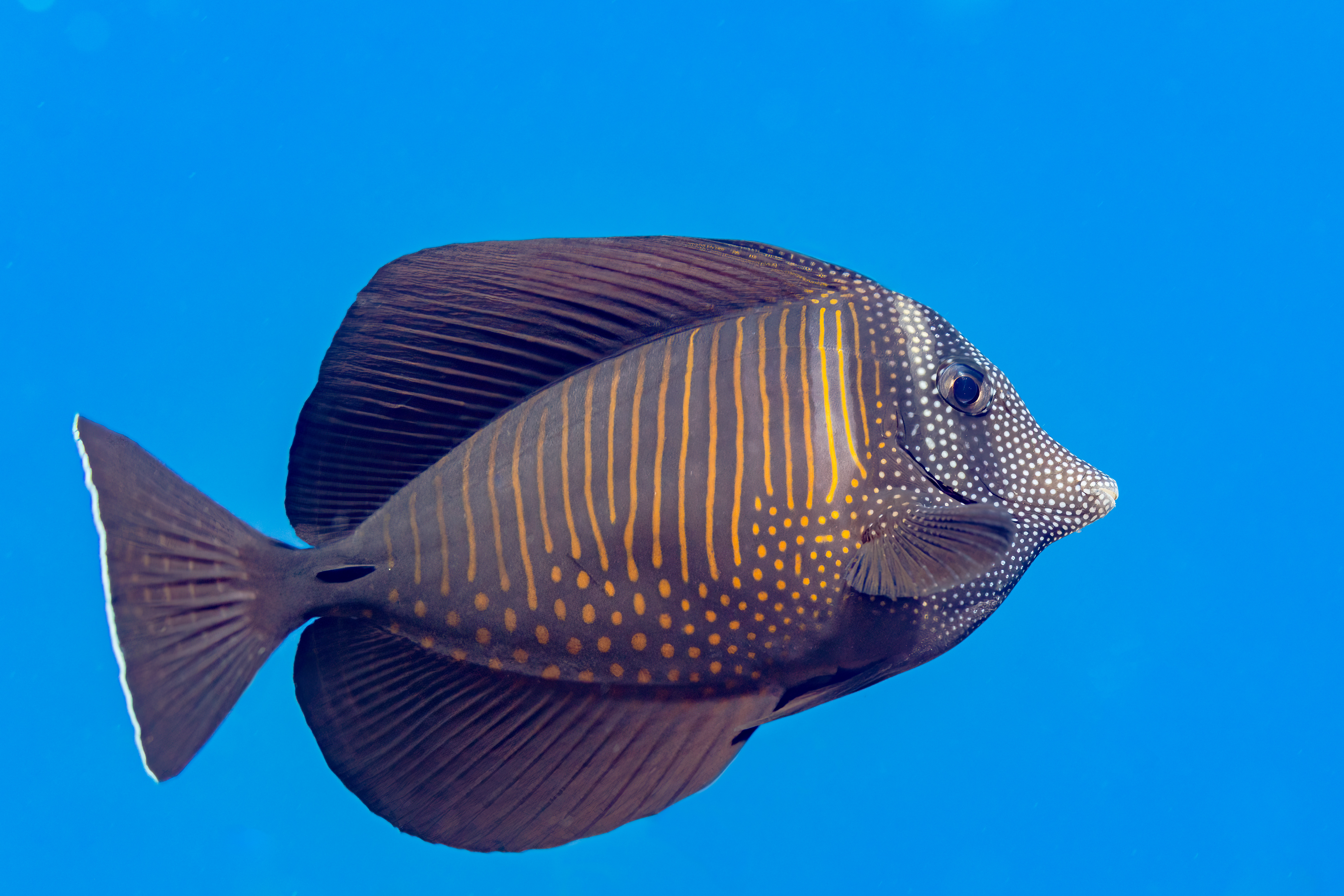
In the Red Sea

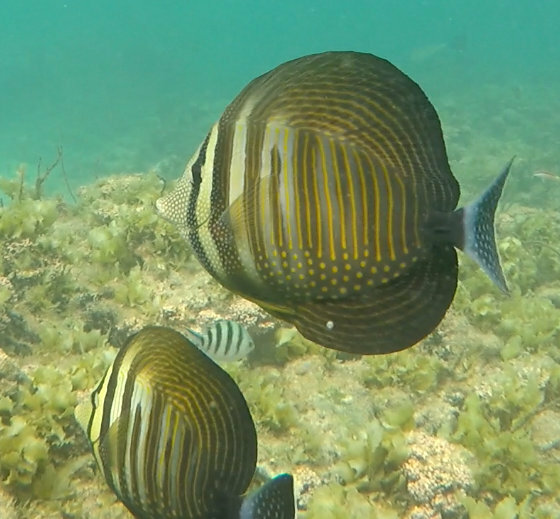
In the Red Sea

Zebrasoma desjardinii has a tall dorsal fin that has 4 spines and between 27-31 soft rays (the longest of which is around half of the standard length); these figures for the anal fin are 2 and 22-24 respectively. It has a deep body, with the standard length being 1.8 to 2 times its depth; the maximum published total length is 40 cm (16 in). The mouth protrudes with a concave profile on the snout. The spine in the caudal peduncle has a narrow posterior connection to the body, and the caudal fin is truncate. The body is grey, with around 8 dark grey vertical bars; each bar houses 2 or 3 orange or yellow vertical lines, which break up into spots towards the lower body and on the anal fin. There are 2 dark brown bars on the head, with the first one passing through the eye. There is a dense pattern of small, light yellow spots on the head and body, and a similar pattern of spots arranged in bands can be on the dorsal fin. The caudal fin is marked with pale blue spots. The juveniles have slender grey and yellow bars on the body and 2 black bars on the head.

== Distribution and habitat ==
Zebrasoma desjardinii is found in the Indian Ocean, including the eastern coast of Africa (as south as Sodwana Bay, South Africa) and the Middle East (e.g. the coasts of Israel, Saudi Arabia and Yemen). It is also found across the islands of the Indian Ocean (such as Sri Lanka, islands in the Andaman Sea, Sumatra, Java, the Cocos Islands and Christmas Island). In 1999, a pair of this species was recorded in the Atlantic Ocean, off Florida, but this was probably due to aquarium release.

Zebrasoma desjardinii is found at depths between 1–30 m (3.3–98.4 ft) in lagoon and seaward reefs, although the juveniles are more typically found in sheltered areas within reefs.

== Behaviour ==
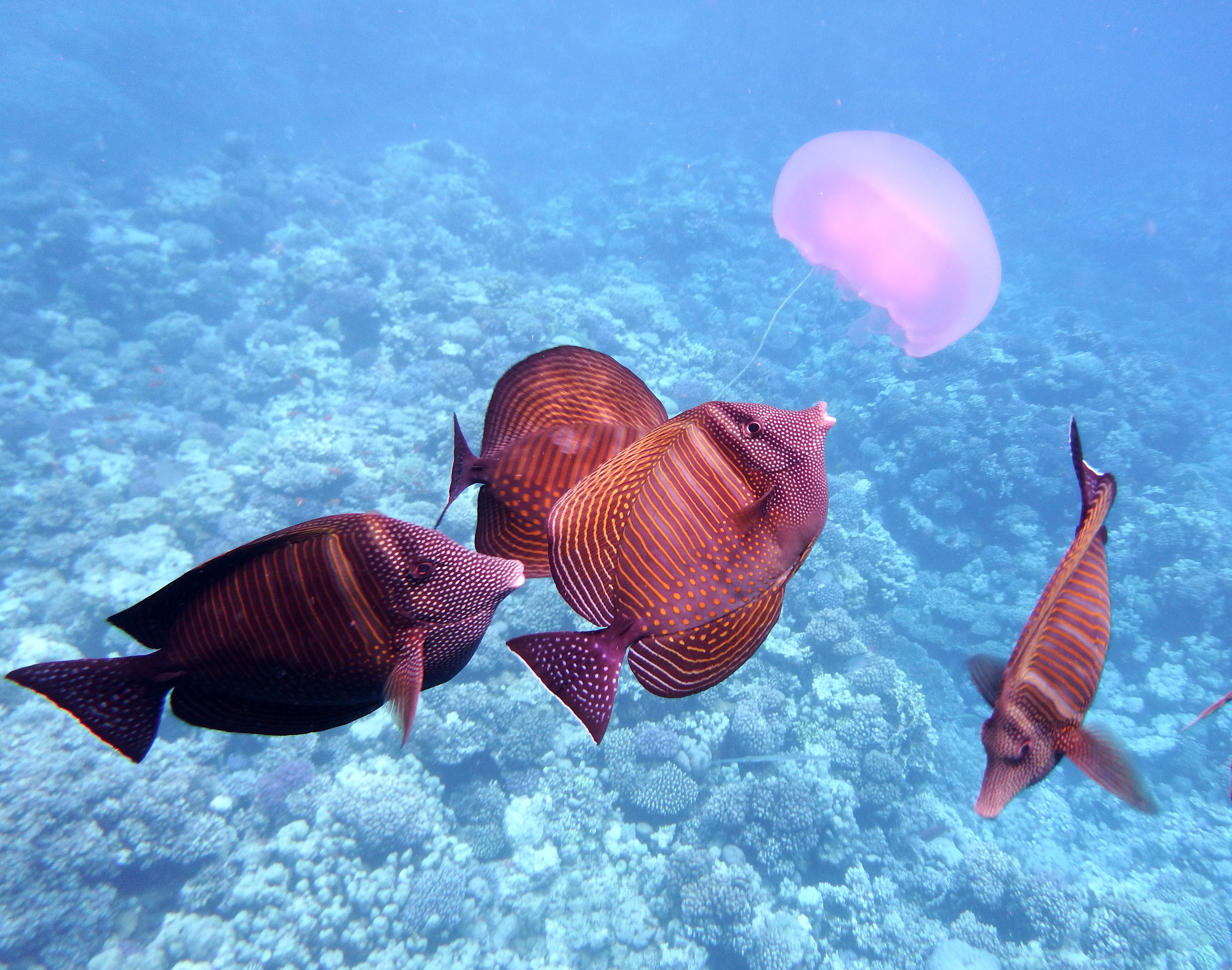
Feeding on a Aurelia solida moon jelly, in the Red Sea.

Zebrasoma desjardinii adults usually can be found in pairs, while juveniles are solitary. They feed primarily on filamentous algae, macroalgae and plankton, but individuals in the Red Sea have been regularly observed feeding on moon jellies (Scyphozoa) and comb jellies (Ctenophora) as well. This species may form aggregations while feeding on algae; if they do so within the territory of the predatory slingjaw wrasse, the wrasse may darken itself so as to match the color of the tangs. The wrasse then joins in the aggregation and mimics their algae-feeding actions while hunting prey.

Zebrasoma desjardinii is a pair spawner; while this is the typical trait of the species in its genus, group spawning is more common at the family level.

== Relationship with humans ==
Zebrasoma desjardinii can be found in the aquarium trade.

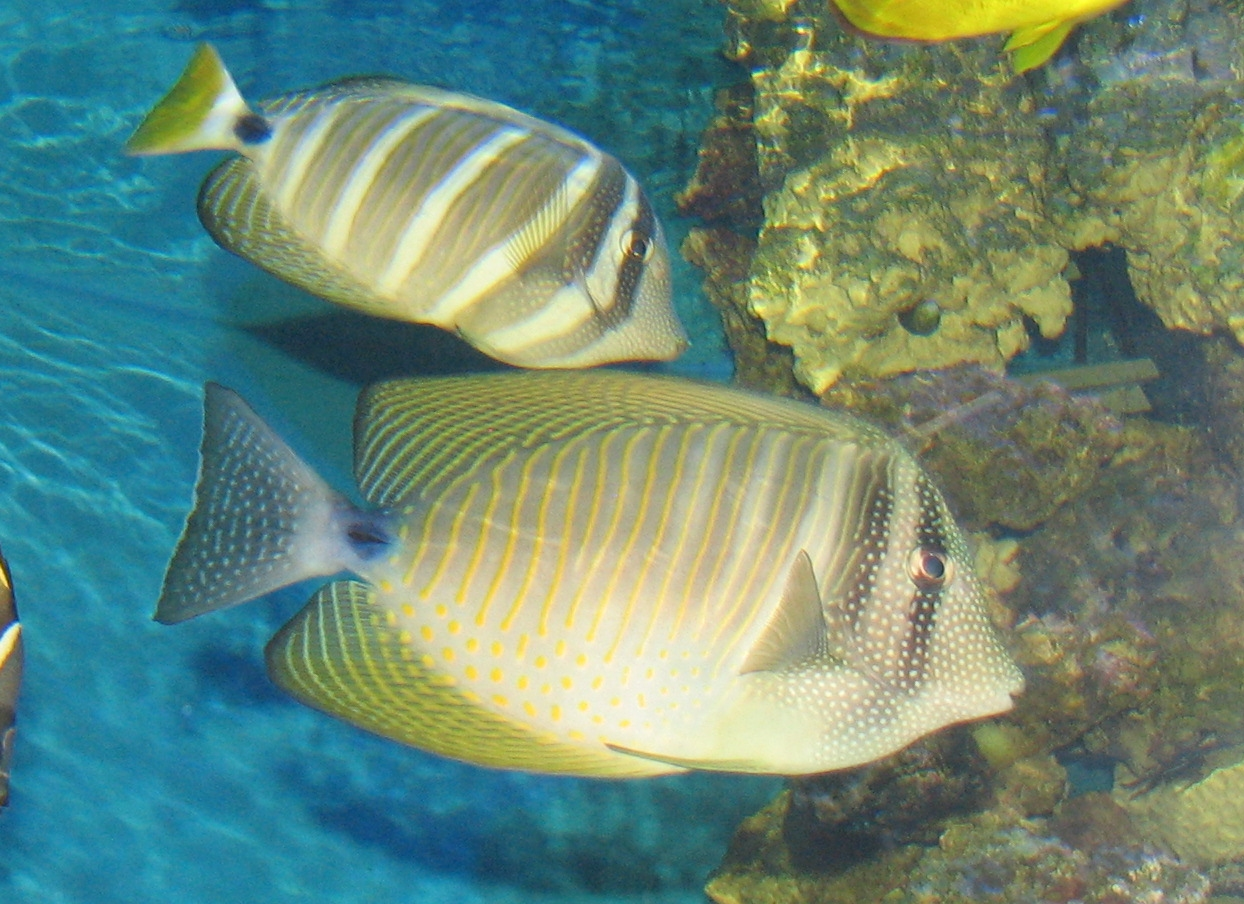
Z. desjardinii (bottom) with Z. velifer (top)

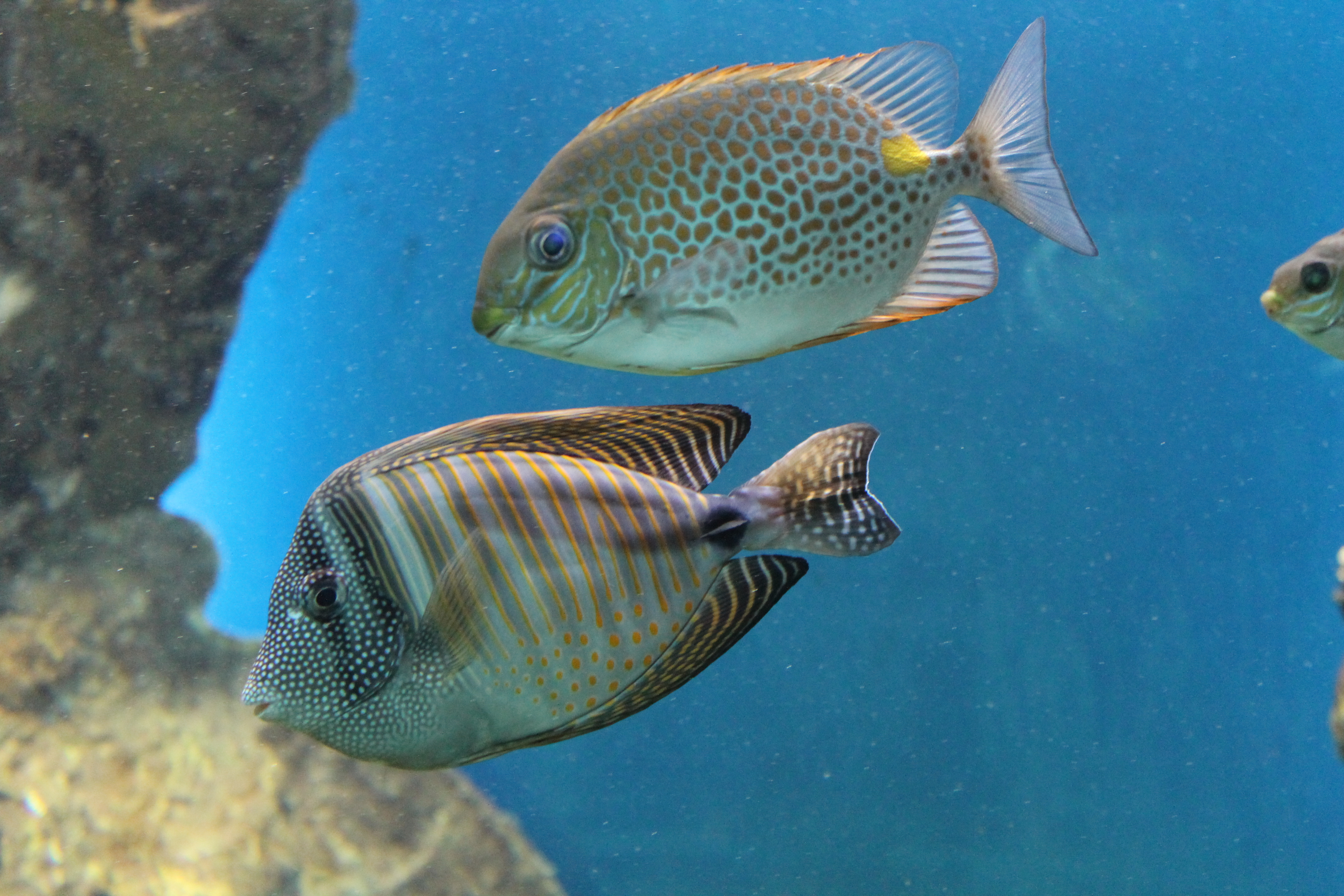
In captivity, with a goldlined rabbitfish

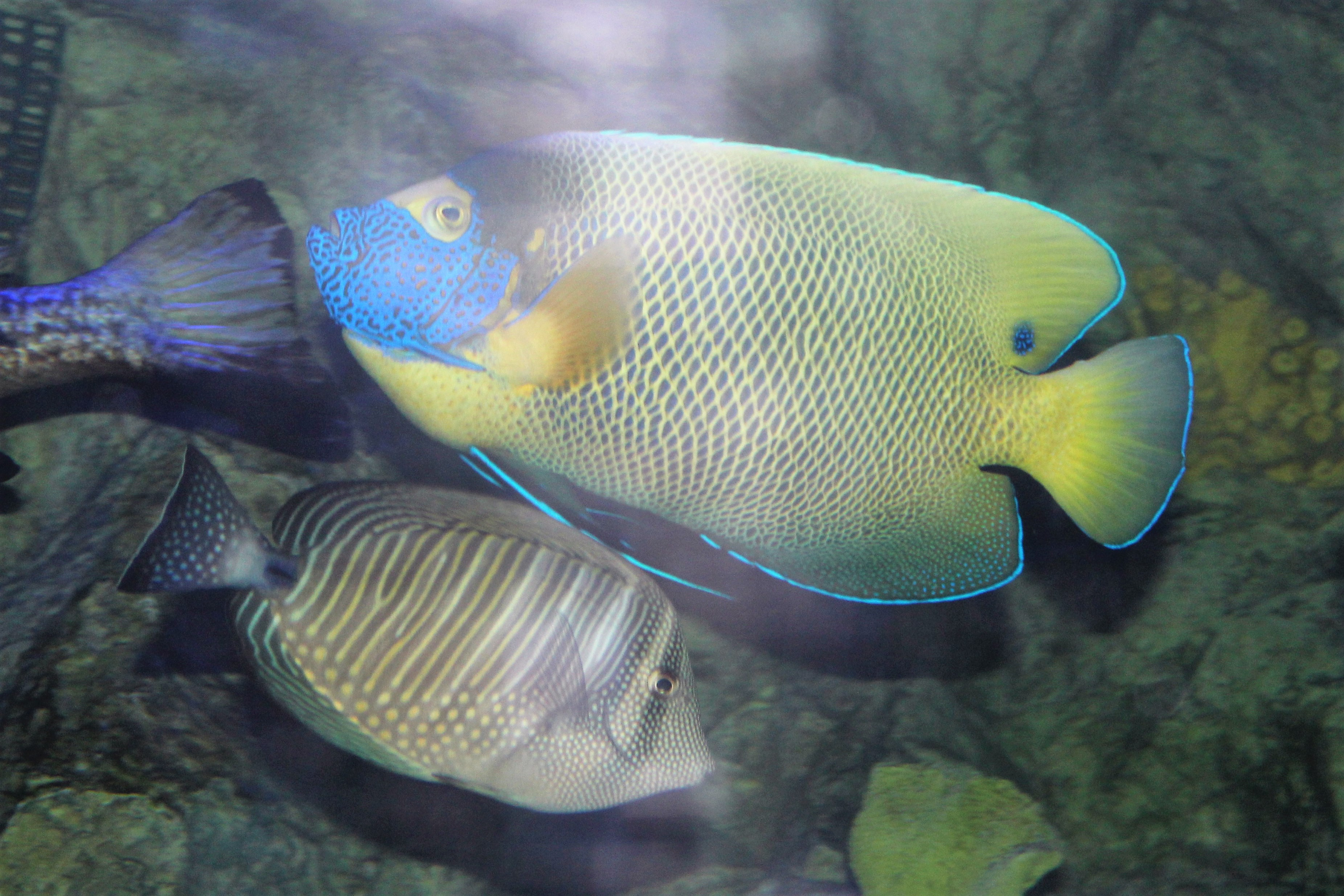
In captivity, with a blueface angelfish

== Bibliography ==
- Sprung, Julian y Delbeek, J.Charles. - The Reef Aquarium. Ricordea Publishing. 1994.
- Debelius, Helmut y Baensch, Hans A. Atlas Marino. Mergus. 1997.
- Michael, Scott W. (en inglés) Reef aquarium fishes. Microcosm.T.F.H. 2005.
- Nilsen, A.J. y Fossa, S.A. - Reef Secrets. TFH Publications .2002.
