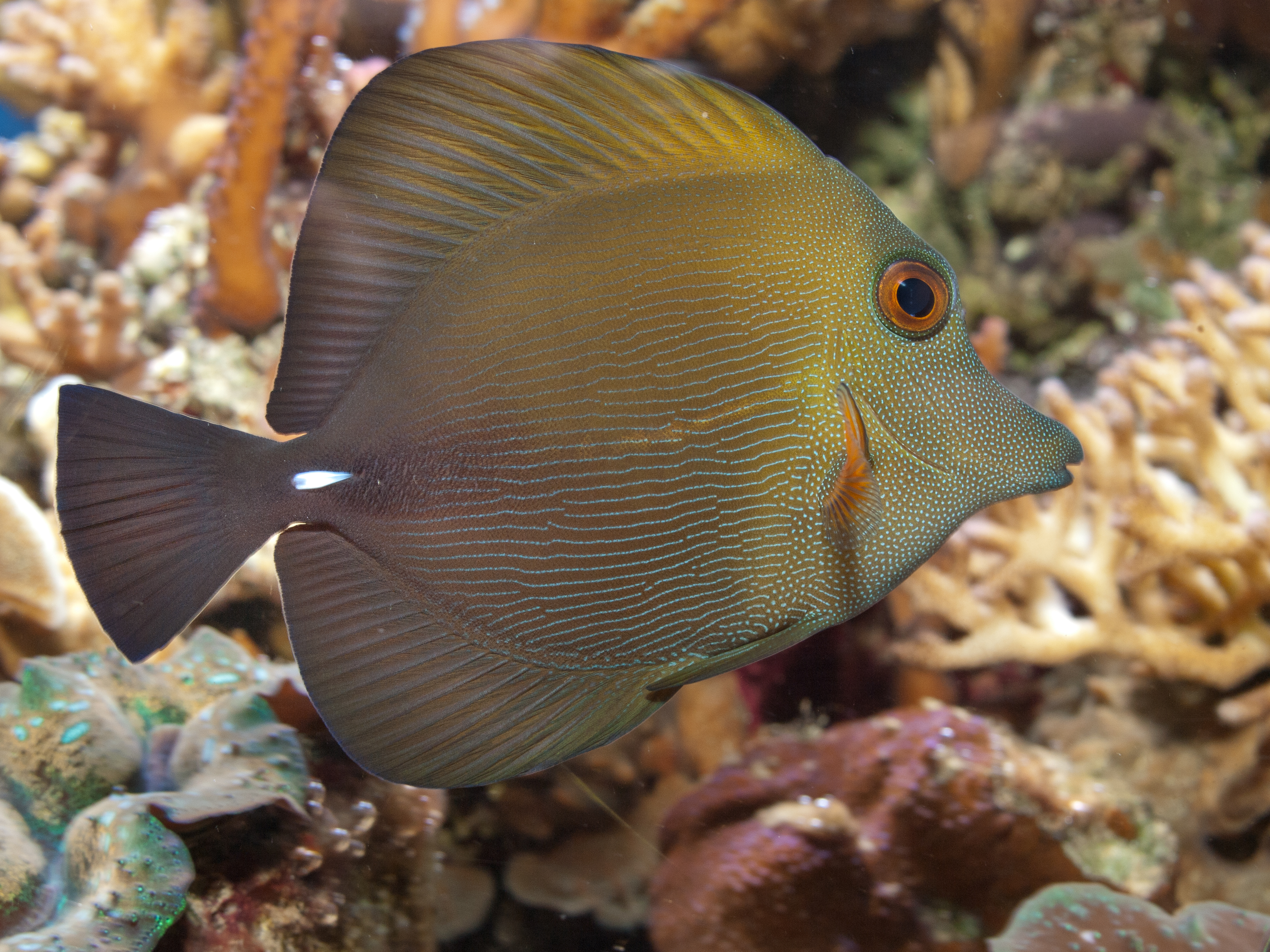

Conservation status
- Least Concern (IUCN 3.1)

Scientific classification
- Kingdom: Animalia
- Phylum: Chordata
- Class: Actinopterygii
- Division: Teleostei
- Order: Acanthuriformes
- Family: Acanthuridae
- Genus: Zebrasoma
- Species: Z. scopas

Binomial name
- Zebrasoma scopas (G. Cuvier, 1829)

Synonyms
- Acanthurus scopas Cuvier, 1829; Acanthurus suillus Cuvier, 1829; Acanthurus altivelis Valenciennes, 1835; Acanthurus ruppelii Bennett, 1836; Zebrasoma supraalba Fowler, 1946

= Zebrasoma scopas =

Species of fish

Zebrasoma scopas, the brown tang, twotone tang, scopas tang or brush-tail tang, is a species of marine ray-finned fish belonging to the family Acanthuridae which includes the surgeonfishes, unicornfishes and tangs. The brown tang is found throughout Oceania and is a herbivorous fish, feeding predominantly on filamentous algae. It is a highly popular fish in the aquarium trade.

== Taxonomy ==
Zebrasoma scopas was first formally described as Acanthurus scopas in 1829 by the French zoologist Georges Cuvier with its type locality given as Banda Neira in the Banda Islands of Indonesia. The brown tang is part of a species pair within the genus Zebrasoma, along with the yellow tang (Z. flavescens). The genera Zebrasoma and Paracanthurus make up the tribe Zebrasomini within the subfamily Acanthurinae in the family Acanthuridae, according to the 5th edition of Fishes of the World.

== Etymology ==
Zebrasoma scopas has the specific name scopas, meaning "broom", a reference to the bristles on the caudal peduncle near the spine.

== Description ==
Zebrasoma scopas is a laterally compressed, deep bodied fish with a protruding snout which grows to a maximum published standard length of 40 centimetres (16 in). The head is whitish and the body pale brown shading to a dark brownish-black near the black tail. There are faint pale green longitudinal lines starting as dots at the head end and becoming continuous and then dotted again posteriorly. The juveniles are rather paler and have yellowish bars near the anterior end. They also have relatively larger dorsal fins. The adults have a white spine on the caudal peduncle. The large, sail-like dorsal fin has 4 or 5 spines and 23 to 25 soft rays. The anal fin has 3 spines and 19 to 21 soft rays.

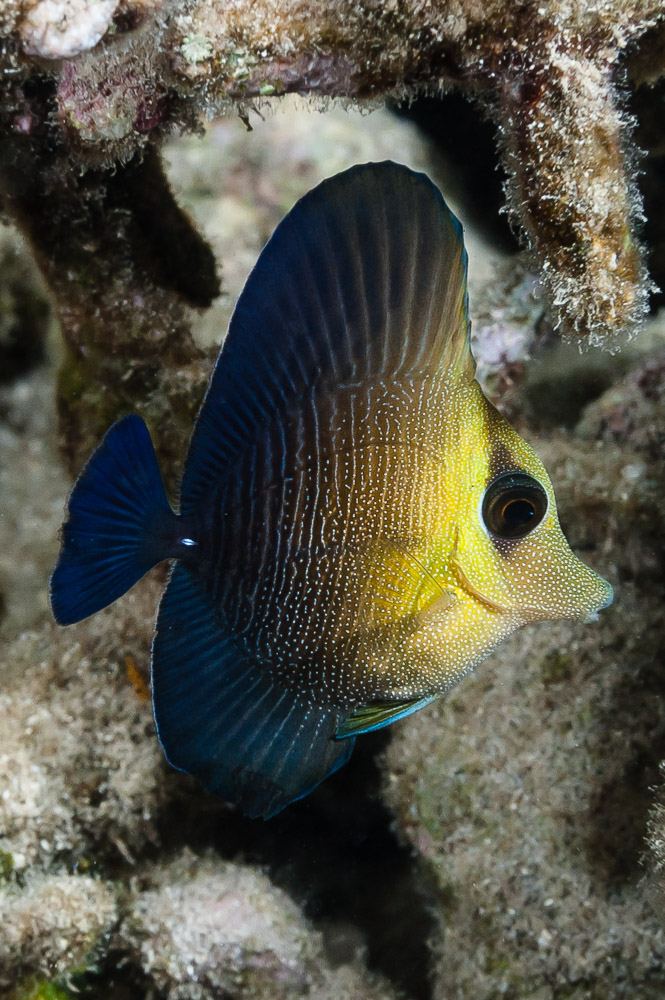
Juvenile

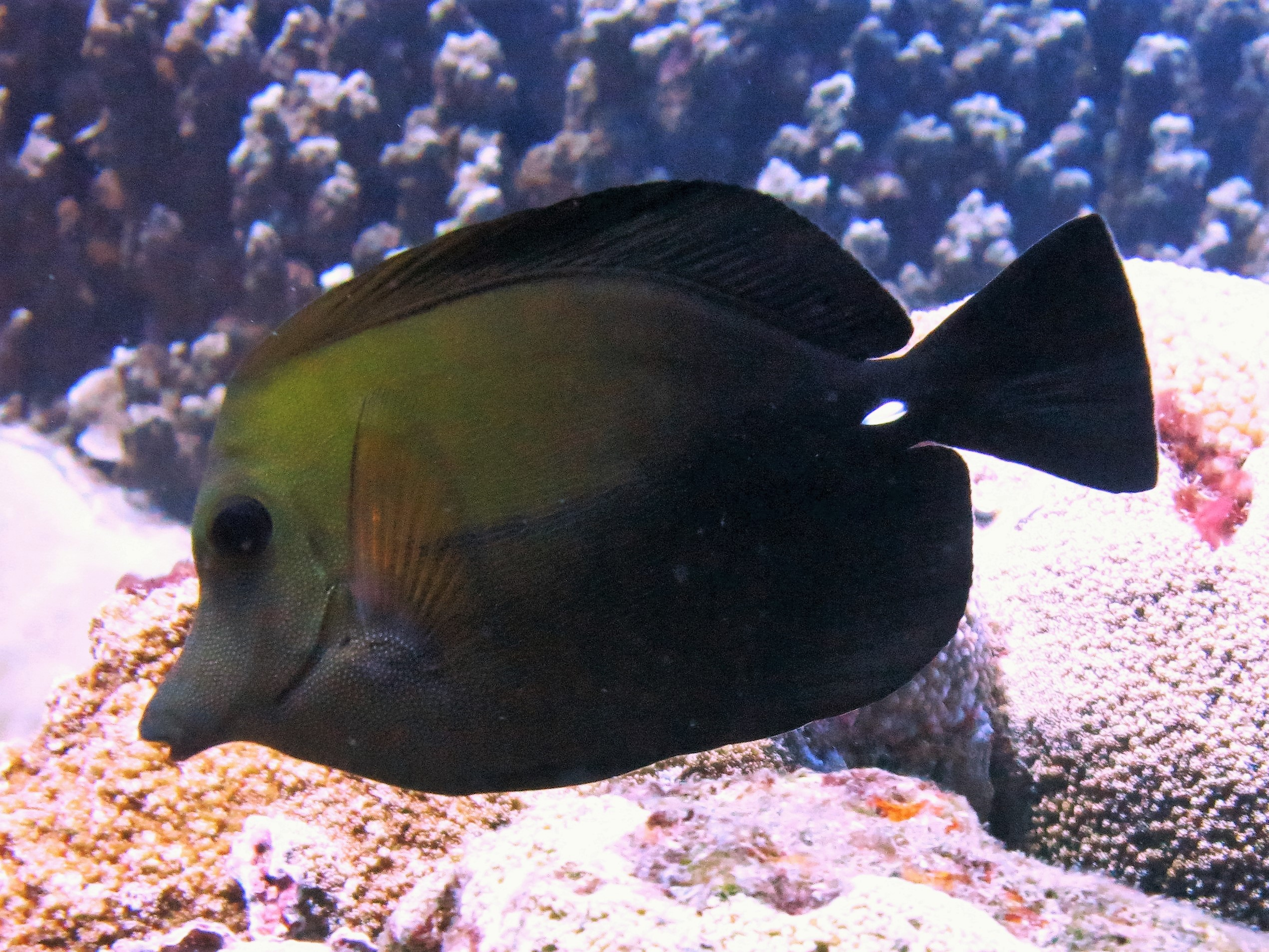
Adult

== Distribution ==
Zebrasoma scopas is found in the Indo-Pacific region, living at water depths of up to 60 metres (200 ft). Its range extends from the coasts of East Africa to Japan, the Pitcairn Islands, Malaysia, Indonesia, Japan, Australia, Lord Howe Island and Rapa Iti. In 2008, a brown tang was observed near Fort Lauderdale, Florida, far outside its native range.

== Biology ==
Zebrasoma scopas feeds mainly on filamentous algae. For this purpose it has specialised pharyngeal teeth. It is usually found on the exposed side of reefs and in coral-rich lagoons. The adults are gregarious and sometimes form schools but the juveniles are solitary and are often to be found swimming among corals.

The brown tang is monogamous, though spawning has been observed both between pairs and among small groups. The male tends to be larger than the female. The fish rush up to the surface to spawn, fertilisation is external and the eggs are scattered in the water column. The larvae are planktonic for several weeks before settling and undergoing metamorphosis into juveniles.

== Use in aquaria ==
Zebrasoma scopas is readily available and are easier tangs for the novice aquarist. Brown tangs do not bother coral and are safe to keep in a reef aquarium. They are smaller and less aggressive than other members of the family Acanthuridae. Brown tangs require an aquarium no less than 75 gallons. These fish are more tolerant of a wide range of living conditions. They will accept various food including meaty materials but the main part of the diet should be vegetable. They will eat the algae that tend to grow inadvertently in the tank. Brown tangs are one of the more peaceful species within its genus and can be kept with other species of tangs..
