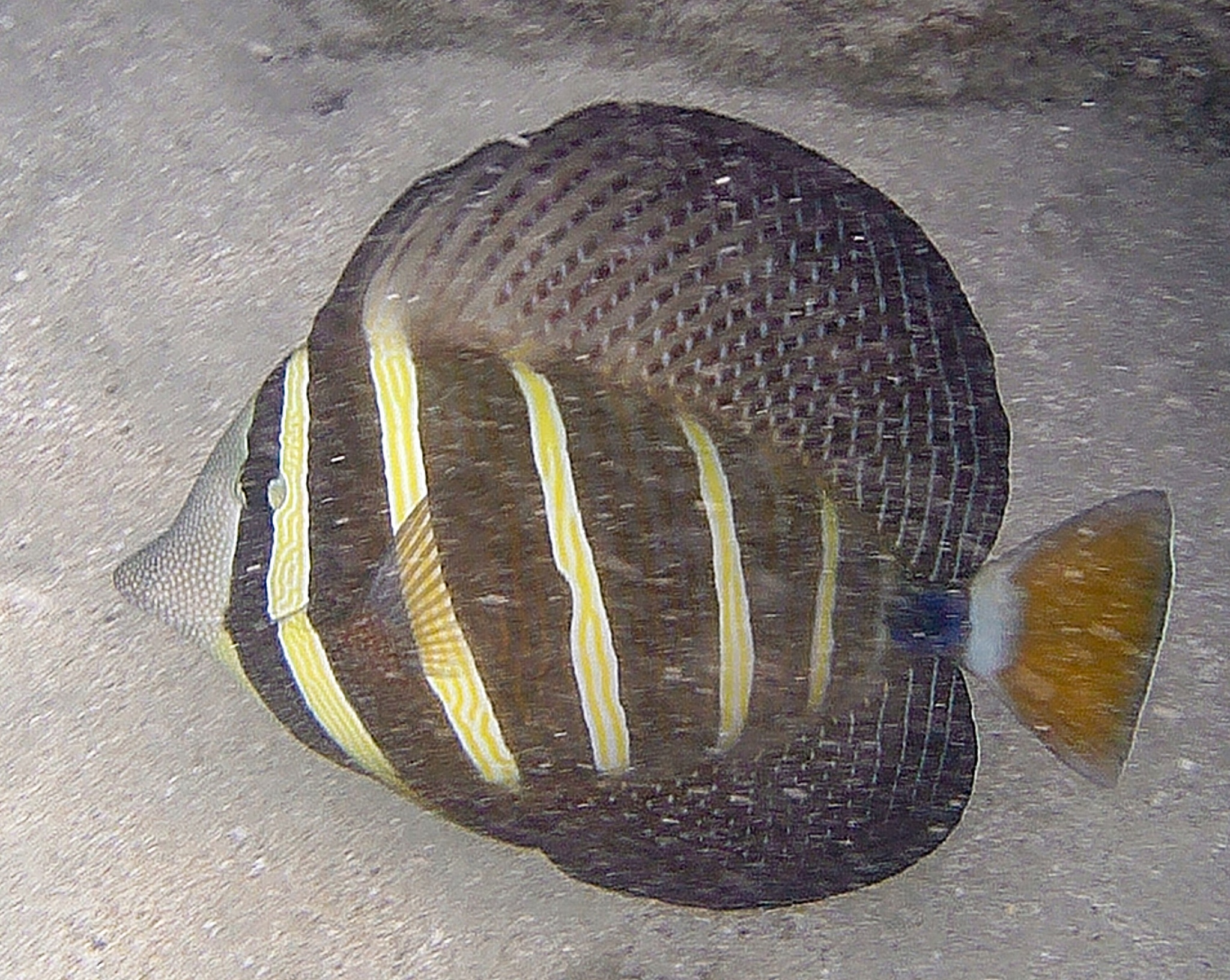
- Zebrasoma velifer

Scientific classification
- Kingdom: Animalia
- Phylum: Chordata
- Class: Actinopterygii
- Division: Teleostei
- Order: Acanthuriformes
- Family: Acanthuridae
- Tribe: Zebrasomini
- Genus: Zebrasoma; Swainson, 1839

Type species
- Acanthurus velifer Bloch, 1795

Species
- 7, see text

Synonyms
- Laephichthys Ogilby, 1916; Scopas Kner, 1865

= Zebrasoma =

Genus of fishes

Zebrasoma is a genus of marine ray-finned fishes belonging to the family Acanthuridae, which includes the surgeonfishes, unicornfishes, and tangs. These species are found in the Indo-Pacific region.

== Taxonomy ==
Zebrasoma was first proposed as a monotypic subgenus of Acanthurus in 1839 by English zoologist William Swainson, with Acanthurus velifer, which had been described by Marcus Elieser Bloch from India in 1795, as its only species. The seven species within the genus form a number of apparent clades. The striped clade is probably the most basal and includes Z. desjardinii and Z. velifer, these two often being regarded as conspecific. Z. gemmatum is regarded as being on a monospecific clade between the basal striped clade and the others. The remaining two higher clades are species pairs, one made up of Z. flavescens and Z. scopas and the other of Z. rostratum and Z. xanthurum. The genera Zebrasoma and Paracanthurus make up the tribe Zebrasomini within the subfamily Acanthurinae in the family Acanthuridae, according to the 5th edition of Fishes of the World.

=== Etymology ===
Zebrasoma combines soma, meaning "body", with zebra, referring to zebra stripes on the body of the type species, Z. velifer.

== Distribution ==
Zebrasoma tangs are found in the Indian and Pacific Oceans including the Red Sea east to the Pitcairn Islands and Hawaii.

== Description ==
Zebrasoma tangs have deep bodies and pointed snouts with high dorsal, supported by four or five spines and between 23 and 31 soft rays, and anal fins, supported by three spines and between 19 and 25 soft rays. The pectoral fins have between 14 and 17 fin rays, while the pelvic fins have a single spine and five soft rays. The caudal fin is truncated.

The smallest species in the genus is the yellow tang (Z. flavescens) with a maximum published total length of 20 cm (7.9 in), while the largest species are Z. scopas, Z. desjardinii, and Z. velifer, each with a maximum published standard length of 40 cm (16 in).

== Species ==
Zebrasoma currently has seven recognised species classified within it:

Image	Species	Common name
	Zebrasoma desjardinii (E. T. Bennett, 1836)	Desjardin's sailfin tang
	Zebrasoma flavescens (E. T. Bennett, 1828)	yellow tang
	Zebrasoma gemmatum (Valenciennes, 1835)	gem tang
	Zebrasoma rostratum (Günther, 1875)	black tang
	Zebrasoma scopas (G. Cuvier, 1829)	twotone tang
	Zebrasoma velifer (Bloch, 1795)	sailfin tang
	Zebrasoma xanthurum (Blyth, 1852)	purple tang

== Uses ==
Zebrasoma tangs are regarded as desirable aquarium fish due to their adaptability, largely peaceful nature, and feeding habits. All currently known members of this family have a viable tolerance to copper-based medications, including ionic and chelated, and can be kept in systems that employ these antiparasitic techniques.
