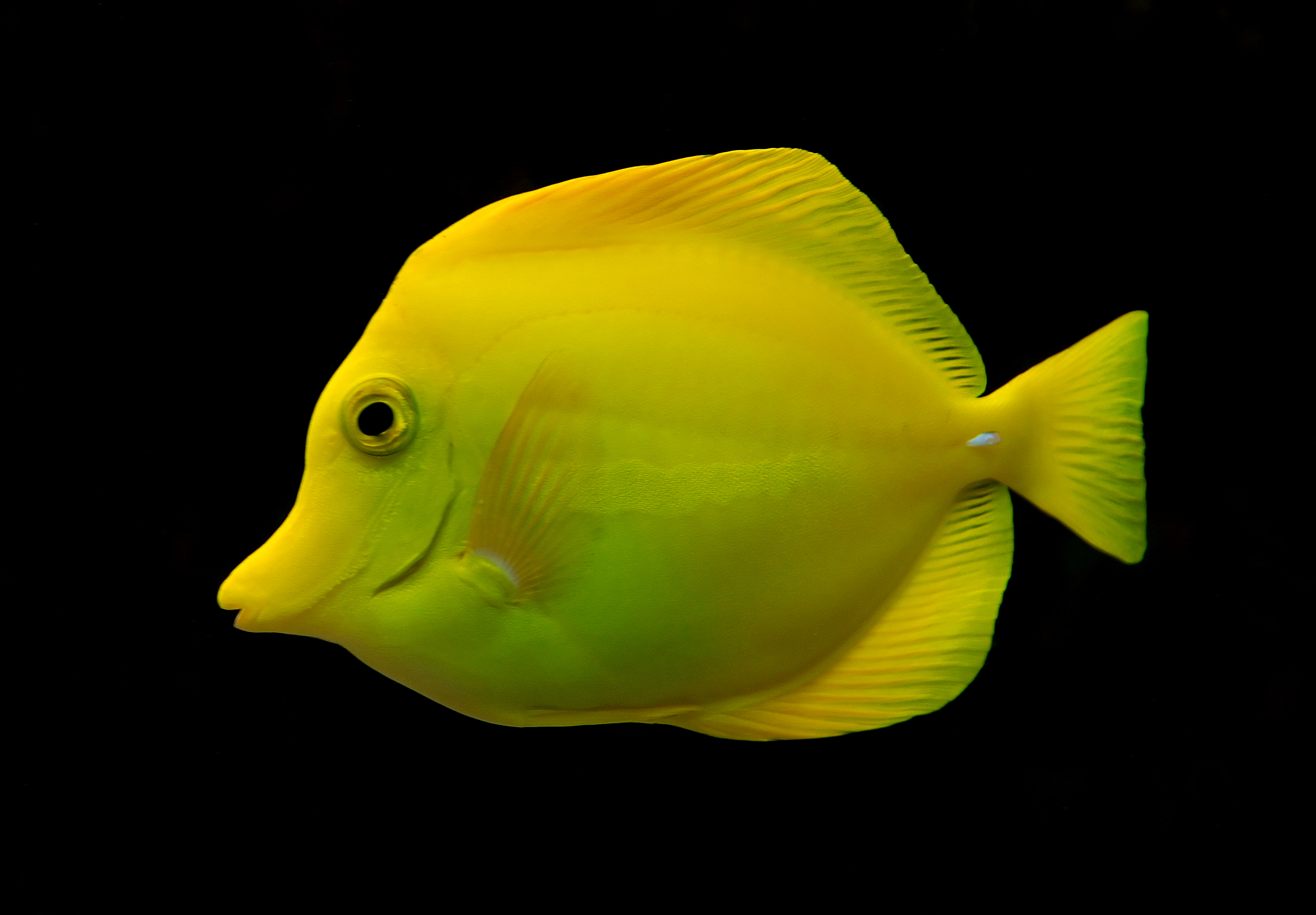

Conservation status
- Least Concern (IUCN 3.1)

Scientific classification
- Kingdom: Animalia
- Phylum: Chordata
- Class: Actinopterygii
- Division: Teleostei
- Order: Acanthuriformes
- Family: Acanthuridae
- Genus: Zebrasoma
- Species: Z. flavescens

Binomial name
- Zebrasoma flavescens (E. T. Bennett, 1828)

Synonyms
- Acanthurus flavescens Bennett, 1828

= Yellow tang =

Species of fish

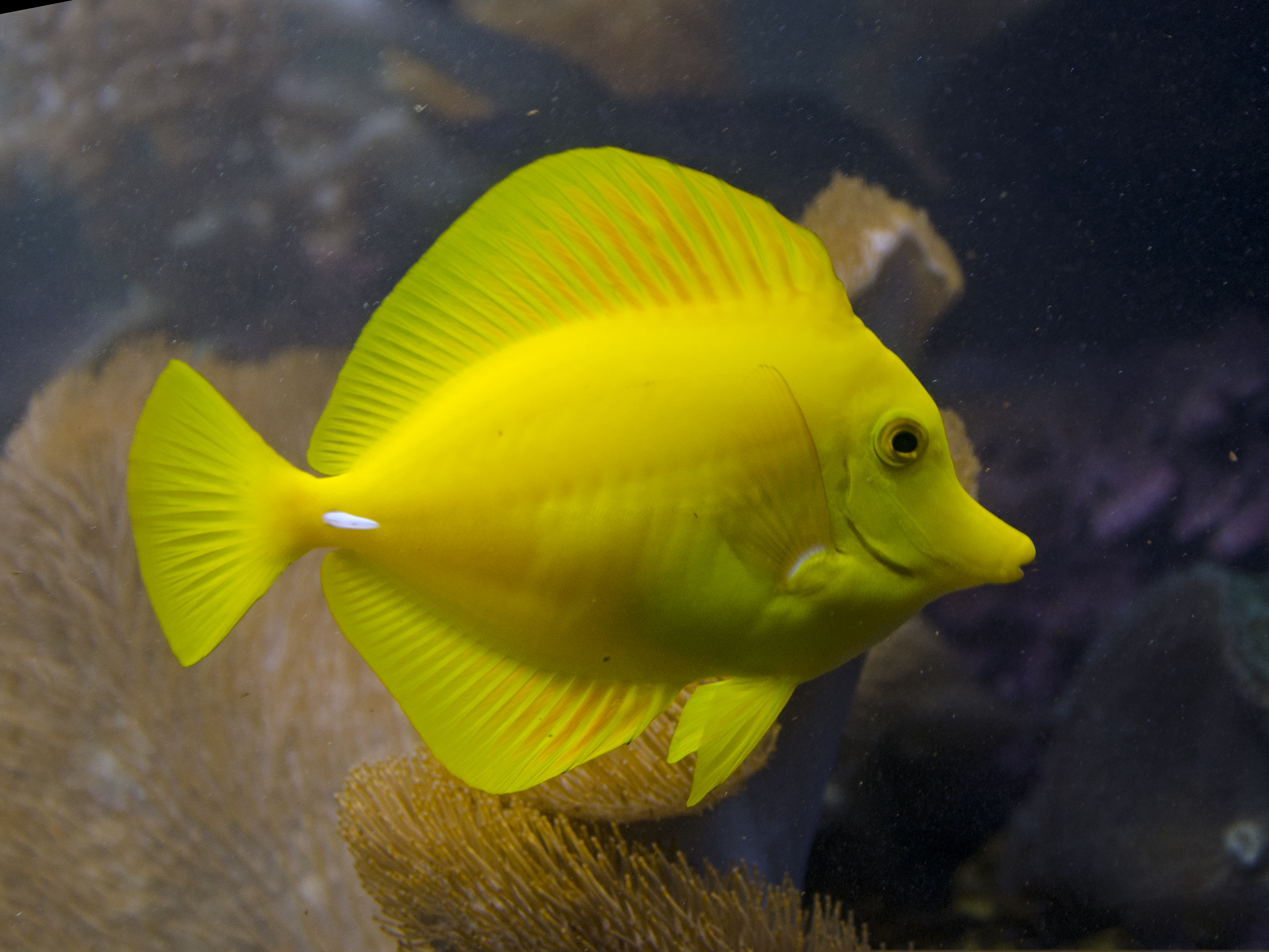
With fins fully extended

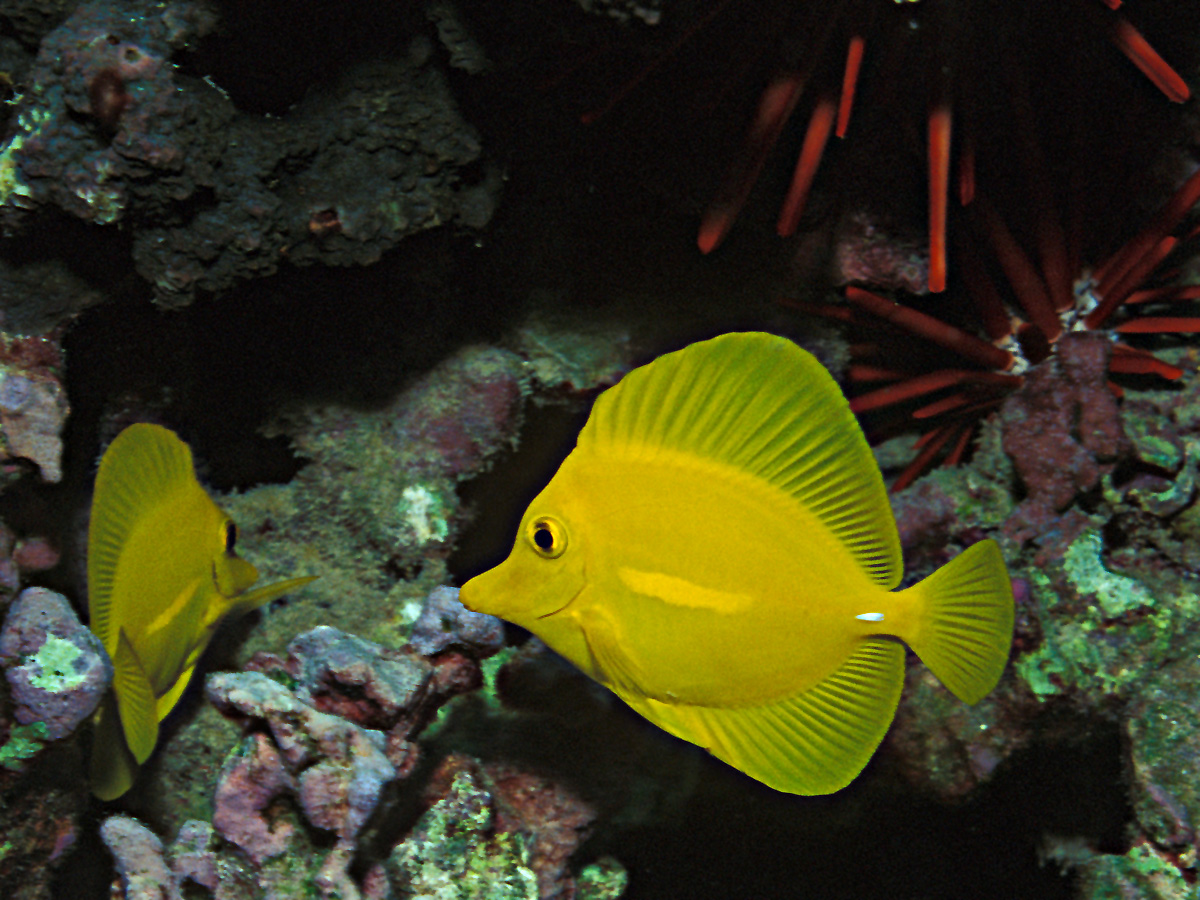
In Maui

The yellow tang (Zebrasoma flavescens), also known as the lemon sailfin, yellow sailfin tang or somber surgeonfish, is a species of marine ray-finned fish belonging to the family Acanthuridae which includes the surgeonfishes, unicornfishes and tangs. Bright yellow in color, this Pacific reef fish is also one of the most popular marine aquarium fish. The yellow tang spawns around a full moon, eats algae, and has a white barb located just before the tail fin to protect itself.

== Taxonomy and etymology ==
The yellow tang was first formally described by English naturalist Edward Turner Bennett as Acanthurus flavescens in 1828 from a collection in the Hawaiian Islands. Zebrasoma refers to the body and the zebra-like stripes or bars on the body of the type species the genus, the sailfin tang (Z. velifer). Its species name is the Latin adjective flavescens, which refers to the tang's yellow color.

Within the genus Zebrasoma the yellow tang forms a species pair with the scopas tang (Z. scopas).

== Distribution and habitat ==
It is commonly found in shallow reefs, from 2–46 metres (6.6–150.9 ft) deep, in the Pacific Ocean (Ryukyu, Mariana, Marshall, Marcus, Wake, and Hawaiian islands), west of Hawaii and east of Japan.

There have also been reports that they have been found off the coast of Florida in the Western Central Atlantic. A single specimen was filmed in the Mediterranean Sea in Spanish waters in 2008, a likely aquarium release. As of July of 2024, yellow tangs have been spotted several times on the shallow reefs of Mexico's Riviera Maya.

Their habitat is tropical with a temperature range of 24–28 °C (75–82 °F).

== Description and biology ==
Adult fish can grow to 20 centimetres (7.9 in) in length, and 1–2 centimetres (0.39–0.79 in) in thickness. Adult males tend to be larger than females. Yellow tangs are bright yellow in color. At night, the yellow coloring fades slightly, and a prominent brownish patch develops in the middle with a horizontal white band. They rapidly regain their bright yellow color during daylight. They can be aggressive, are prone to marine ich, and may damage coral within a reef tank. Male and female yellow tang look very similar. When mating, however, males change color and have a "shimmering" behavior which makes them identifiable.

The yellow tang has 5 dorsal spines along with 23–26 dorsal soft rays. The yellow tang also has 3 anal spines as well as 19–22 anal soft rays. There is a white spine on its caudal peduncle that it can use for defense. Its snout is moderately protruding. Its mouth is small with spatulate teeth that are place classed relatively close together inside of the yellow tang's mouth. In juveniles, there are 12 upper and 14 lower teeth. In adults, there are 18 upper and 22 lower teeth.

In the wild, yellow tangs can live for over 40 years.

== Ecology ==
The yellow tang is a marine fish that lives in reefs and is typically found by itself or in small groups/schools. It is mainly herbivorous and eats filamentous algae. Natural predators include larger fish, sharks, crabs, and octopuses.

== Reproduction ==
Spawning happens throughout the year, and it peaks once, normally occurring around the time the moon is full, so this suggests there is some sort of lunar periodicity to the spawning behavior. Spawning happens in pairs or groups, and fertilization is external. Eggs are left in open water and yellow tang are substratum egg scatterers. Yellow tang do not guard their eggs, and once the eggs hatch, the juveniles receive no parental care.

The larvae of the yellow tang can drift more than 100 miles and reseed in a distant location.

== Diet and feeding ==
In the wild, yellow tangs feed on benthic, uncalcified and filamentous turf algae and other marine plant material, as well as some types of zooplankton. In captivity, they are commonly fed meat/fish-based aquarium food, but the long-term health effects of this diet are questionable. However, most experts in the marine aquarium industry express little scepticism that such a well rounded and balanced diet including plant and animal material would be in any way detrimental to mostly herbivorous fishes like tangs since they still need on occasion, complex amino acids and nutrients that only ocean animals can provide. In the wild, yellow tangs provide cleaner services to marine turtles, by removing algal growth from their shells.

== Conservation ==
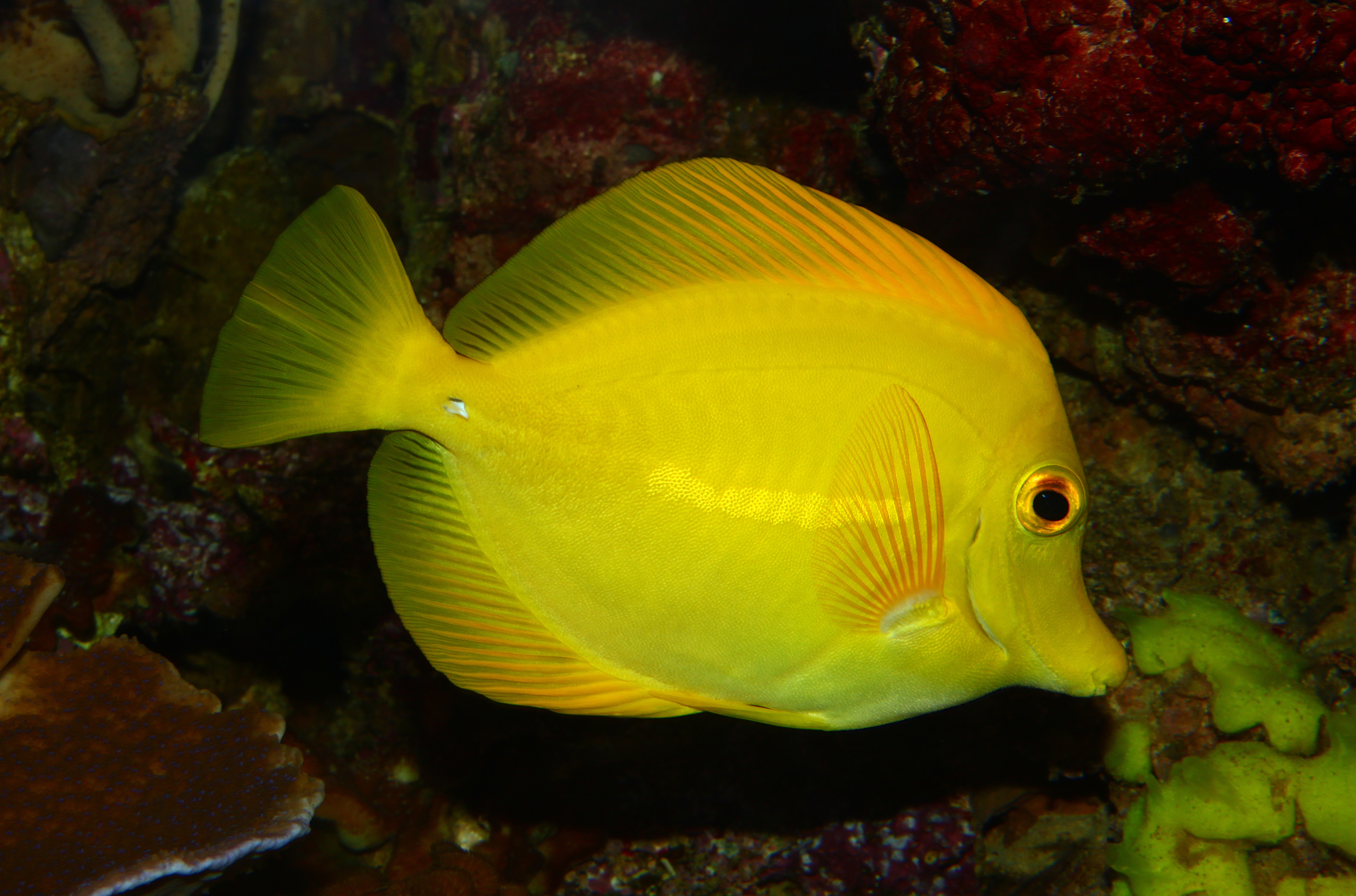
At the State Museum of Natural History Karlsruhe

The yellow tang is listed as least concern on the IUCN Red List. The tropical yellow tang is heavily fished by the aquarium trade. Every year, 300,000 to 500,000 yellow tang were collected from the wild in Hawaii alone. Hawaii was the most common place for aquarium harvesting, prior to the export ban, where up to 70% of the yellow tangs for the aquarium industry were sourced from. By the late 1990s, their stocks were collapsing. Nine marine protected areas were established off the coast of Hawaii to protect them. Over 70% of the yellow tang's natural range is protected from collection and fishing.

In 2010, one study found that fish larvae can drift on ocean currents and reseed fish stocks at a distant location. This finding demonstrated that fish populations can be connected to distant locations through the process of larval drift. They investigated the yellow tang, because larva of this species stay in the general area of the reef in which they first settle. Larval drift has helped them establish themselves in different locations, and the fishery is recovering. "We've clearly shown that fish larvae that were spawned inside marine reserves can drift with currents and replenish fished areas long distances away," said coauthor Mark Hixon.

In response to the market for the species as well as the threats to the species posed by the aquarium industry, techniques were developed to breed the species in captivity for the aquarium market. In 2015, researchers successfully bred them in captivity.

== In the aquarium ==
At uShaka Sea World

The yellow tang is very commonly kept as a saltwater aquarium fish. They can grow up to 8 inches (20 cm) in the wild, but are introduced to aquariums in the 2-to-4-inch (5.1 to 10.2 cm) range. Some specimens as large as 6 inches (15 cm) are occasionally available.

Prior to January 2021, yellow tangs were commonly selling for around $65 to $70 in the US. However, after a collection ban in Hawaii, the prices have more than quadrupled to over $400.
