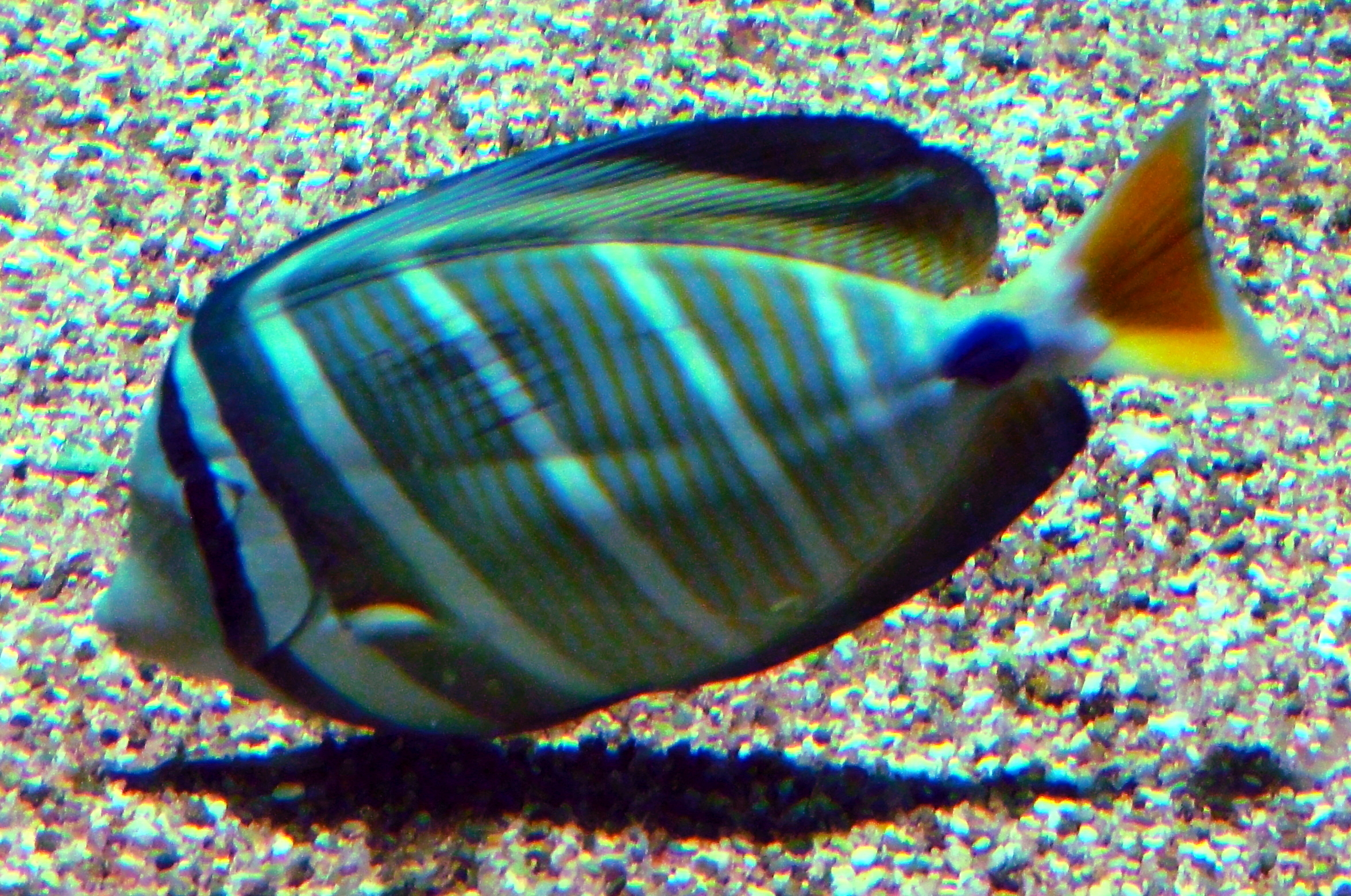
- Zebrasoma veliferum
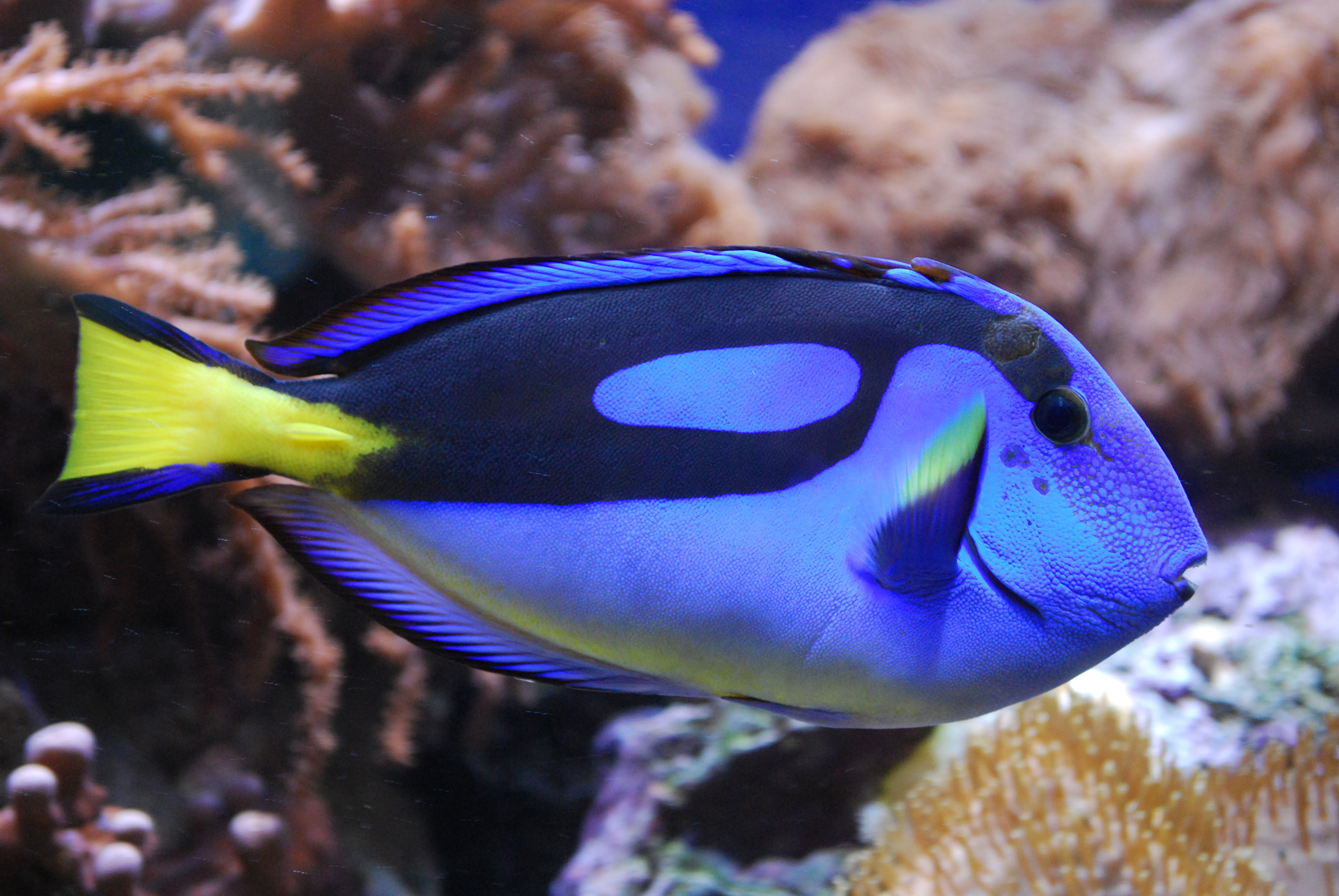
- Paracanthurus hepatus

Scientific classification
- Kingdom: Animalia
- Phylum: Chordata
- Class: Actinopterygii
- Order: Acanthuriformes
- Family: Acanthuridae
- Subfamily: Acanthurinae
- Tribe: Zebrasomini; Richard Winterbottom, 1993

Genera
- see text

= Zebrasomini =

Tribe of fishes

Zebrasomini is a tribe of marine ray-finned fishes belonging to the family Acanthuridae and it is one of three tribes in the subfamily Acanthurinae.

== Taxonomy ==
Zebrasomini was first proposed as a taxon in 1933 by American ichthyologist Richard Winterbottom, Winterbottom delineated it as consisting of the two genera Zebrasomus and Paracanthurus, alongside the monotypic tribe Prionurini and with the remaining two Acanthurine genera, Acanthurus and Ctenochaetus, being classified in the tribe Acanthurini. These tribes make up the subfamily Acanthurinae which with the subfamily Nasinae make up the family Acanthuridae.

== Genera ==
There are two genera within the tribe Zebrasomini:

- Paracanthurus Bleeker, 1863
- Zebrasoma Swainson, 1839

== Characteristics ==
The Zebrasomini was defined by Winterbottom using similarities in the osteology of the skull between the two genera and in comparison to the other two Acanthurine tribes, they also have no scales on their larvae. Winterbottom's treatment has been supported by subsequent phylogenetic studies.
