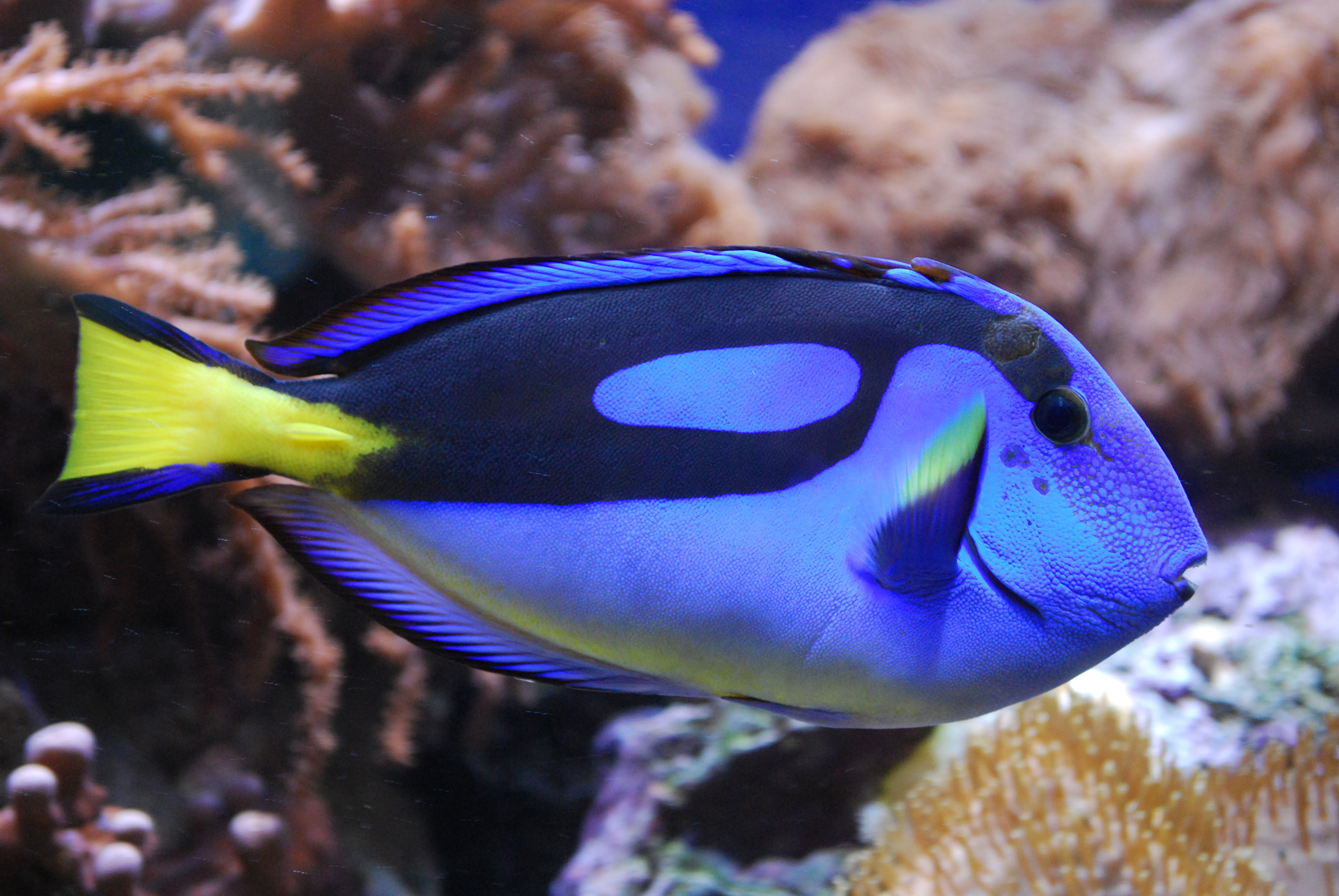

Conservation status
- Least Concern (IUCN 3.1)

Scientific classification
- Kingdom: Animalia
- Phylum: Chordata
- Class: Actinopterygii
- Division: Teleostei
- Order: Acanthuriformes
- Family: Acanthuridae
- Tribe: Zebrasomini
- Genus: Paracanthurus; Bleeker, 1863
- Species: P. hepatus

Binomial name
- Paracanthurus hepatus (Linnaeus, 1766)

= Paracanthurus =

Paracanthurus hepatus

Genus of fishes

Paracanthurus hepatus is a species of Indo-Pacific surgeonfish. A popular fish in marine aquaria, it is the only member of the genus Paracanthurus.

A number of common names are attributed to the species, including palette surgeonfish, blue surgeonfish, blue tang (leading to confusion with the Atlantic species Acanthurus coeruleus), flagtail surgeonfish, hepatus tang, Indo-Pacific bluetang, regal blue surgeonfish, wedge-tailed tang, wedgetail blue tang, royal blue tang, hippo tang, blue hippo tang, regal tang, and regal blue tang.

It is most closely related to genus Zebrasoma, with which it forms a sister group.

== Description ==
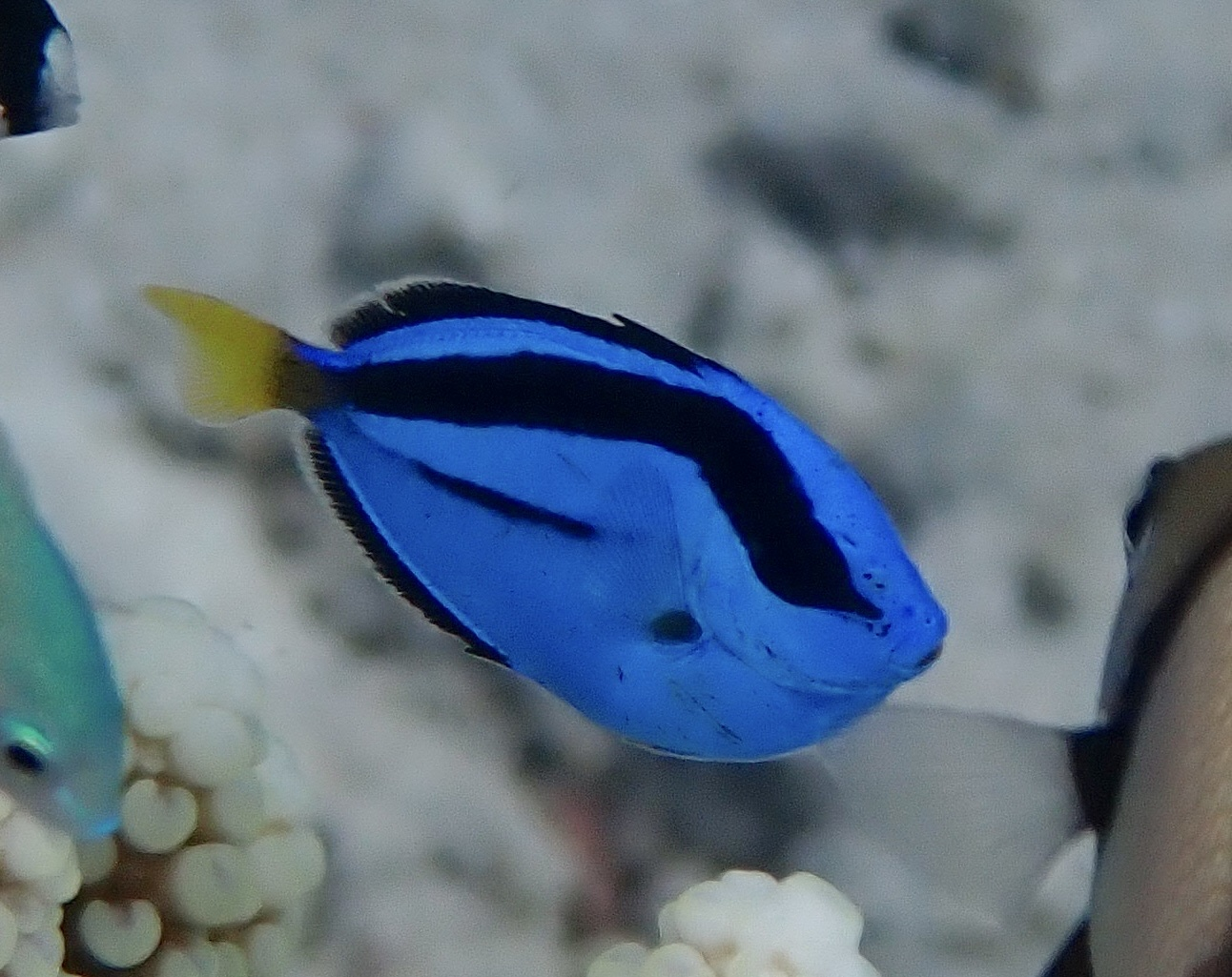
Young juvenile, in Indonesia

Paracanthurus hepatus has a royal blue body, yellow tail, and black "palette" design. Its length at first sexual maturity is 149.2 mm. Adults typically weigh around 600 g (21 oz) and males are generally larger than females. The back has a broad black area that encloses at the tip of the pectoral, creating a blue oval on each side of the fish that extends in the direction of the eye. The tail has a bright yellow triangle with its apex anterior to the caudal spine and its base at the posterior end of the caudal fin. Black surrounds the triangle on the upper and lower lobes of the caudal fin, in the same hue as the back area.

Paracanthurus has small scales, each with short ctenii on the upper surface. Scales on the caudal spine possess ctenii approximately three times as long as scales on the rest of the body. Scales anteriorly placed on the head between the eye and the upper jaw are larger with tuberculated, bony plates.

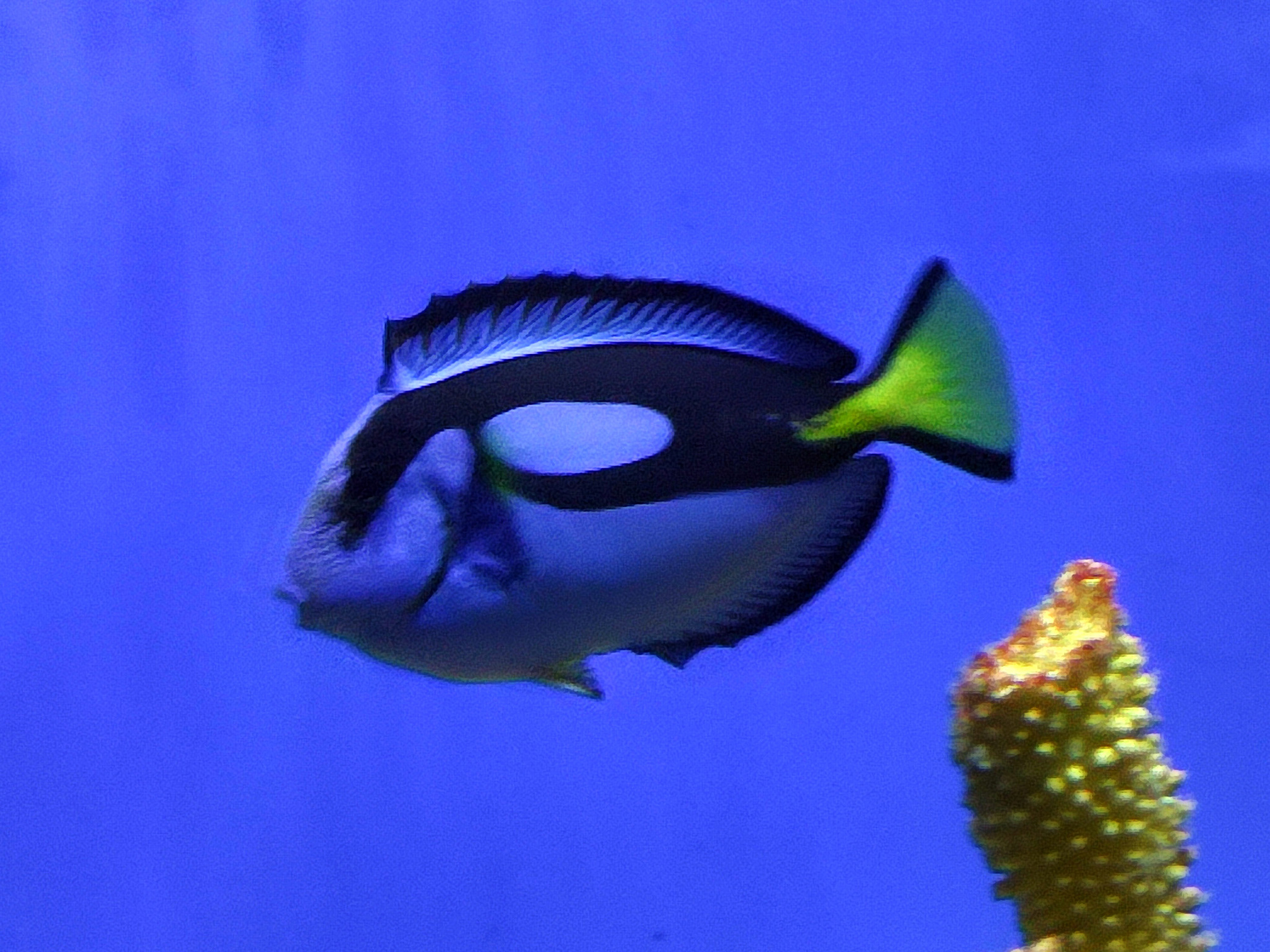
With fins fully extended

This fish has a compressed, elliptical body shape, and a terminal snout. It has nine dorsal spines, 26–28 dorsal soft rays, three anal spines, and 24–26 anal soft yellow rays, and 16 principal caudal rays with slightly projecting upper and lower lobes. Its pelvic fin is made up of one spine and three rays; this characteristic is considered a synapomorphy of the Naso and Paracanthurus genus. The caudal peduncle has a spine located in a shallow groove, which is also a characteristic of its sister taxa Zebrasoma. It has 22 vertebrae. Paracanthurus has teeth that are small, close-set, denticulated, and described as incisor-like.

Jaw morphology includes an ectopterygoid that links the palatine to the quadrate near the articular condyle. A crest is present on the anterodorsal surface of the hyomandibular. The opercle is less developed, with a distinctly convex profile.

Some slight variation in appearance is present within Paracanthurus. The lower body is yellow in west-central Indian Ocean individuals, and bluish in Pacific individuals (4). Additionally, the blue color on the trunk of Paracanthurus loses pigmentation in response to changes in light or melatonin levels, making its appearance slightly lighter in color at night.

== Distribution ==
The regal blue tang can be found throughout the Indo-Pacific. It is seen in the reefs of the Philippines, Indonesia, Japan, the Great Barrier Reef of Australia, New Caledonia, Samoa, East Africa, and Sri Lanka. A single specimen was photographed in 2015 in the Mediterranean Sea off Israel. Vagrants were found on two occasions in Hawaii, and are assumed to be aquarium releases.

Paracanthurus is an extant resident in the following territories: American Samoa; Australia; British Indian Ocean Territory; Brunei Darussalam; Christmas Island; Cocos (Keeling) Islands; Comoros; Cook Islands; Disputed Territory (Paracel Is., Spratly Is.); Fiji; French Southern Territories (Mozambique Channel Is.); Guam; India (Nicobar Is., Andaman Is.); Indonesia; Japan; Kenya; Kiribati (Kiribati Line Is., Phoenix Is., Gilbert Is.); Madagascar; Malaysia; Maldives; Marshall Islands; Mauritius; Mayotte; Micronesia, Federated States of ; Myanmar; Nauru; New Caledonia; Niue; Northern Mariana Islands; Palau; Papua New Guinea; Philippines; Réunion; Samoa; Seychelles; Singapore; Solomon Islands; Somalia; South Africa; Sri Lanka; Taiwan, Republic of China; Tanzania, United Republic of; Thailand; Timor-Leste; Tokelau; Tonga; Tuvalu; United States (Hawaiian Is.); United States Minor Outlying Islands (US Line Is., Howland-Baker Is.); Vanuatu; Viet Nam; Wallis and Futuna.

== Ecology ==
Paracanthurus is a diurnal marine species that occupies marine neritic habitats along coastlines. It is found in clear water on exposed outer reef areas or in channels with a moderate or strong current. It primarily utilizes coral reef habitats, but is also known to utilize seagrass beds, mangroves, algal beds, and rocky reefs [1]. It has an upper and lower depth limit of 2 meters and 40 meters, respectively . They live in pairs or small groups of 8 to 14 individuals. They can also be found near cauliflower corals on the seaweed side of coral reefs. Juveniles can be found in schools using Acropora for shelter. Numbers of males and females tend to maintain a 1:1 ratio.

The fish is important for coral health, as it eats algae that may otherwise choke it by overgrowth.

=== Diet ===
As a juvenile, its diet consists primarily of plankton. Adults are omnivorous and feed on zooplankton, but will also graze on filamentous algae, microalgae and other marine plants.

=== Life cycle ===
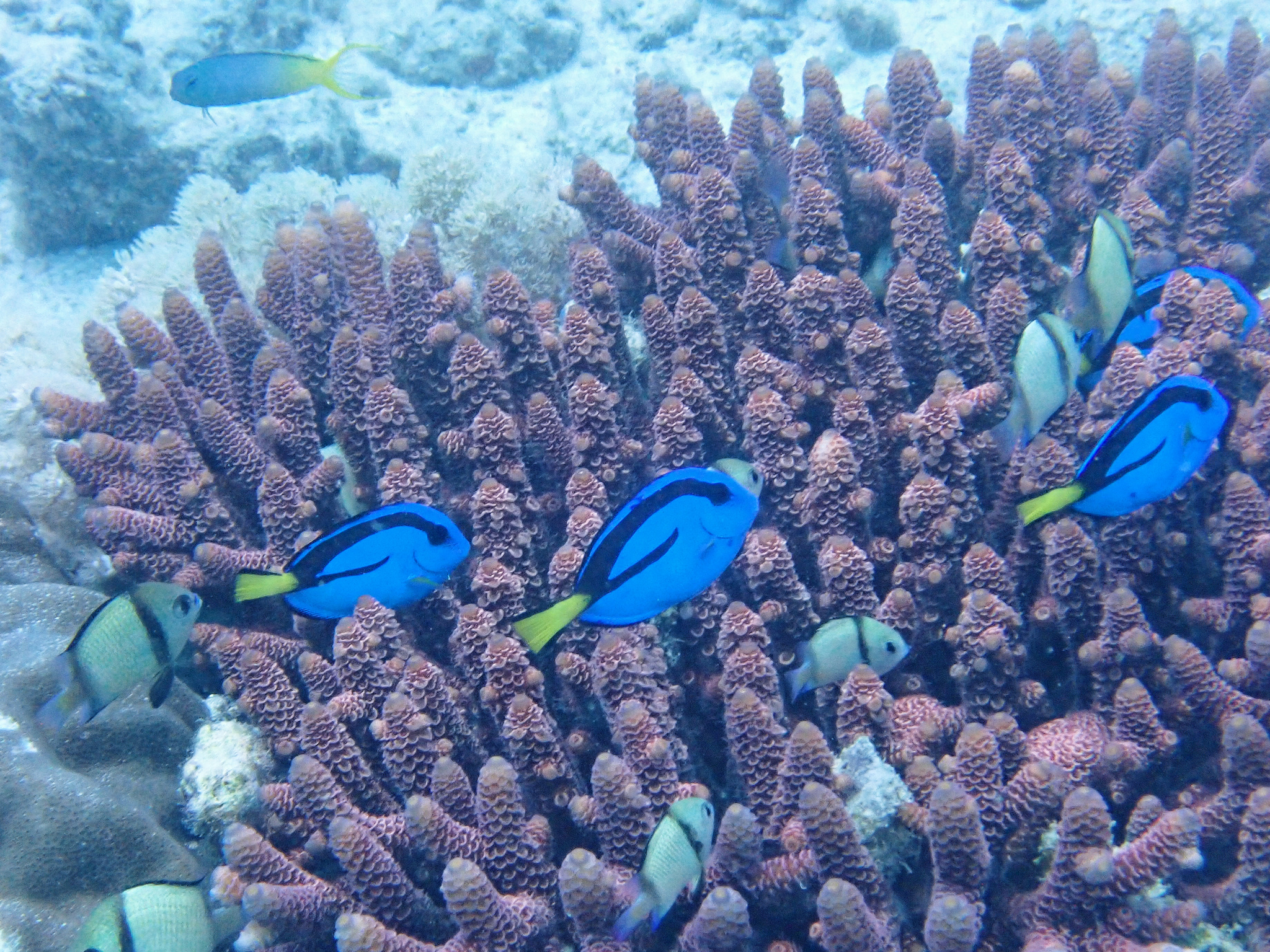
Juveniles

Spawning takes place year round, with a peak between April and September. Spawning occurs during late afternoon and evening hours around outer reef slopes. This event is indicated by a change in color from a uniform dark blue to a pale blue. Males aggressively court female members of the school, leading to a quick upward spawning rush toward the surface of the water during which eggs and sperm are released. The eggs are small, approximately 0.8 millimetres (1/32 in) in diameter. The eggs are pelagic, each containing a single droplet of oil for flotation. The fertilized eggs hatch in twenty-four hours, revealing small, translucent larvae with silvery abdomens and rudimentary caudal spines. Once opaque, the black "palette" pattern on juveniles do not fully connect until mature. These fish reach sexual maturity at 9–12 months of age, and at approximately 149.22 mm in size. Fecundity has a tendency to positively correlate with weight.

Fishes in the family Acanthuridae, including Paracanthurus, produce altricial larvae that receive no v. parental care. After hatching, these larvae rely on yolk reserves to survive their first two to three days of life.

== Importance to humans ==
Paracanthurus swimming in an aquarium

The regal blue tang is of minor commercial fisheries importance; however, it is a bait fish. The flesh has a strong odor and is not highly prized. This fish may cause ciguatera poisoning if consumed by humans. However, regal blue tangs are collected commercially for the aquarium trade. Handling the tang risks the chances of being badly cut by the caudal spine. These spines, one on each of the two sides of the caudal peduncle, the area where the tail joins the rest of the body, are extended when the fish is stressed. The quick, thrashing sideways motion of the tail can produce deep wounds that result in swelling and discoloration, posing a risk of infection. It is believed that some species of Acanthurus have venom glands while others do not. The spines are used only as a method of protection against aggressors.

The regal blue tang is one of the most common and most popular marine aquarium fish all over the world, holding its place as the 8th most traded species worldwide. In 1997–2002, 74,557 individuals were traded in official tracked sales and in 2011 approximately 95,000 Paracanthurus were imported for use as a marine ornamental fish. When harvesting Paracanthurus in the wild, juveniles are specifically targeted since they are easiest to collect due to their tendency to travel in schools. Paracanthurus for human use are harvested in the wild rather than raised in aquaculture. Conservationists encourage efforts to switch to aquaculture in order to better preserve wild populations.

== In popular culture ==
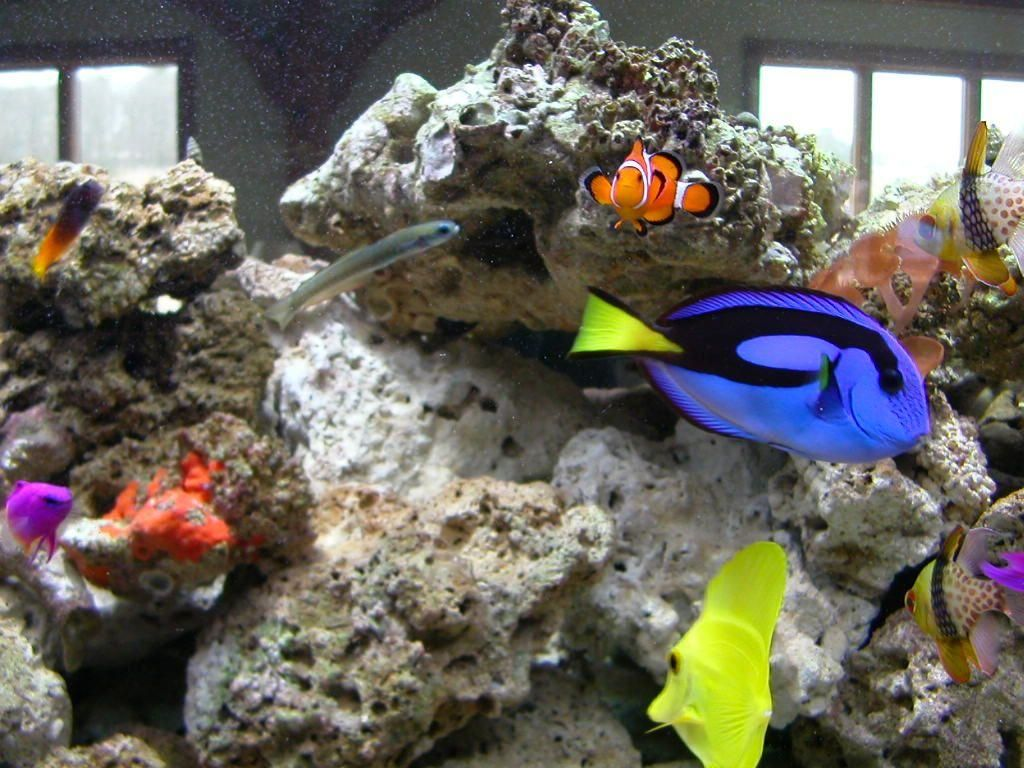
Reef tank with a regal blue tang and several other types of fish featured in the film Finding Nemo, including a royal gramma, yellow tang and ocellaris clownfish.

In the 2003 Disney/Pixar animated film, Finding Nemo, one of the main characters, Dory (voiced by Ellen DeGeneres) is a regal blue tang suffering from short term memory loss. She and her parents, Jenny and Charlie (voiced by Diane Keaton and Eugene Levy), appear in the 2016 Disney/Pixar animated film sequel, Finding Dory.

After the release of Finding Nemo in 2003, popular media outlets reported a rise in demand for clownfish, the co-star alongside blue tang in the film, to such an extent the phenomena was coined the Nemo effect. However, the legitimacy of the Nemo effect was disputed by peer-reviewed analysis. Nonetheless, a similar wave of rumors circulated the Internet following the release of Finding Dory in 2016. According to peer-reviewed analysis, online searches for blue tang increased for two to three weeks after the release of Finding Dory, though data on imports of Paracanthurus show there was no significant increase in imports of blue tang following the release of the film.

== Conservation ==
The species is classified as Least concern by the IUCN. No population declines were found when last assessed by IUCN in 2010. Its current population trend is unknown and there is insufficient data on catch. While rare throughout its range, it is widespread geographically. Its distribution overlaps with multiple marine protected areas.

However, it is threatened by overexploitation (mostly for the aquarium trade) and destructive fishing practices. Individuals for aquarium trade are predominantly wild caught, so monitoring of wild populations is needed to prevent overharvest. Since it is dependent on fragile coral reef habitats, habitat destruction also constitutes pressure in parts of its range. Of individuals in the family Acanthuridae, 80% have experienced a 30% loss of coral reefs across their distribution. More research is needed to fully understand the effects of this loss on Acanthuridae. In an endeavor to mitigate the destruction of natural regal blue tang populations, efforts have been made to breed the species in captivity. It was successfully captive-bred for the first time in 2016, after a six-year-long effort by biologist Kevin Barden of Rising Tide Conservation.
