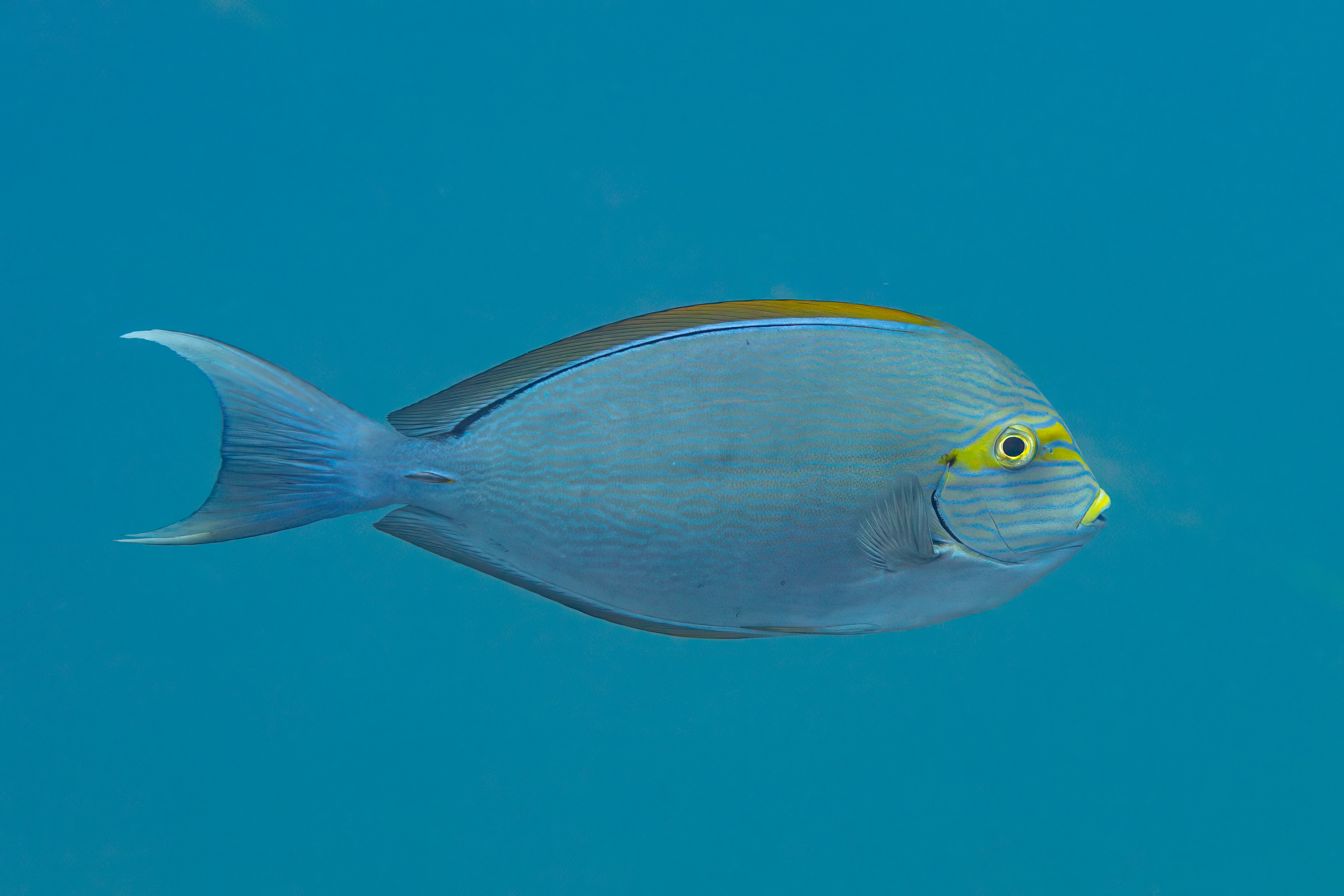

Conservation status
- Least Concern (IUCN 3.1)

Scientific classification
- Kingdom: Animalia
- Phylum: Chordata
- Class: Actinopterygii
- Division: Teleostei
- Order: Acanthuriformes
- Family: Acanthuridae
- Genus: Acanthurus
- Species: A. mata

Binomial name
- Acanthurus mata (G. Cuvier, 1829)

Synonyms
- Chaetodon mata Cuvier, 1829; Acanthurus bleekeri Günther, 1861; Hepatus weberi Ahl, 1923; Acanthurus weberi Ahl, 1923

= Acanthurus mata =

Species of fish

Acanthurus mata, the pale surgeonfish, blue-lined surgeonfish (also a name for Acanthurus nigroris and Acanthurus lineatus), mata surgeonfish, striped surgeonfish, tailring surgeon, white-tail lancet or yellowmask surgeonfish, is a species of marine ray-finned fish belonging to the family Acanthuridae, the surgeonfishes, unicornfishes and tangs. This species is found in the Indo-Pacific region.

== Taxonomy ==
Acanthurus mata was first formally described as Chaetodon mata in 1829 by the French zoologist Georges Cuvier with no type locality given, although it is known to be the Coromandel Coast of India. The genus Acanthurus is one of two genera in the tribe Acanthurini which is one of three tribes in the subfamily Acanthurinae which is one of two subfamilies in the family Acanthuridae.

== Etymology ==
Acanthurus mata has the specific name mata which is the local name reported in 1803 by Patrick Russell for this fish on the Coromandel Coast.

== Description ==
Acanthurus mata is a medium sized fish that can reach a maximum size of 50 centimetres (20 in) length. The body has an oval shape and is compressed laterally. Like other surgeonfishes, Acanthurus mata swims with its pectoral fins. The caudal fin has a crescent shape. The mouth is small and pointed. Its body is streaked with horizontal bluish lines on a brown background color although over time it is able to change colour to become grey-blue overall. A longitudinal yellow stripe runs across the eye and splits in two lines extending anterior the eye. The superior lip is also yellow. The dorsal and anal fin are bluish with a yellow reflection, with the base of the latter underlined by a fine black line. A sharp erectile spine (comparable to a scalpel, thus the species name) at the base of the tail is a defensive weapon.

== Distribution ==
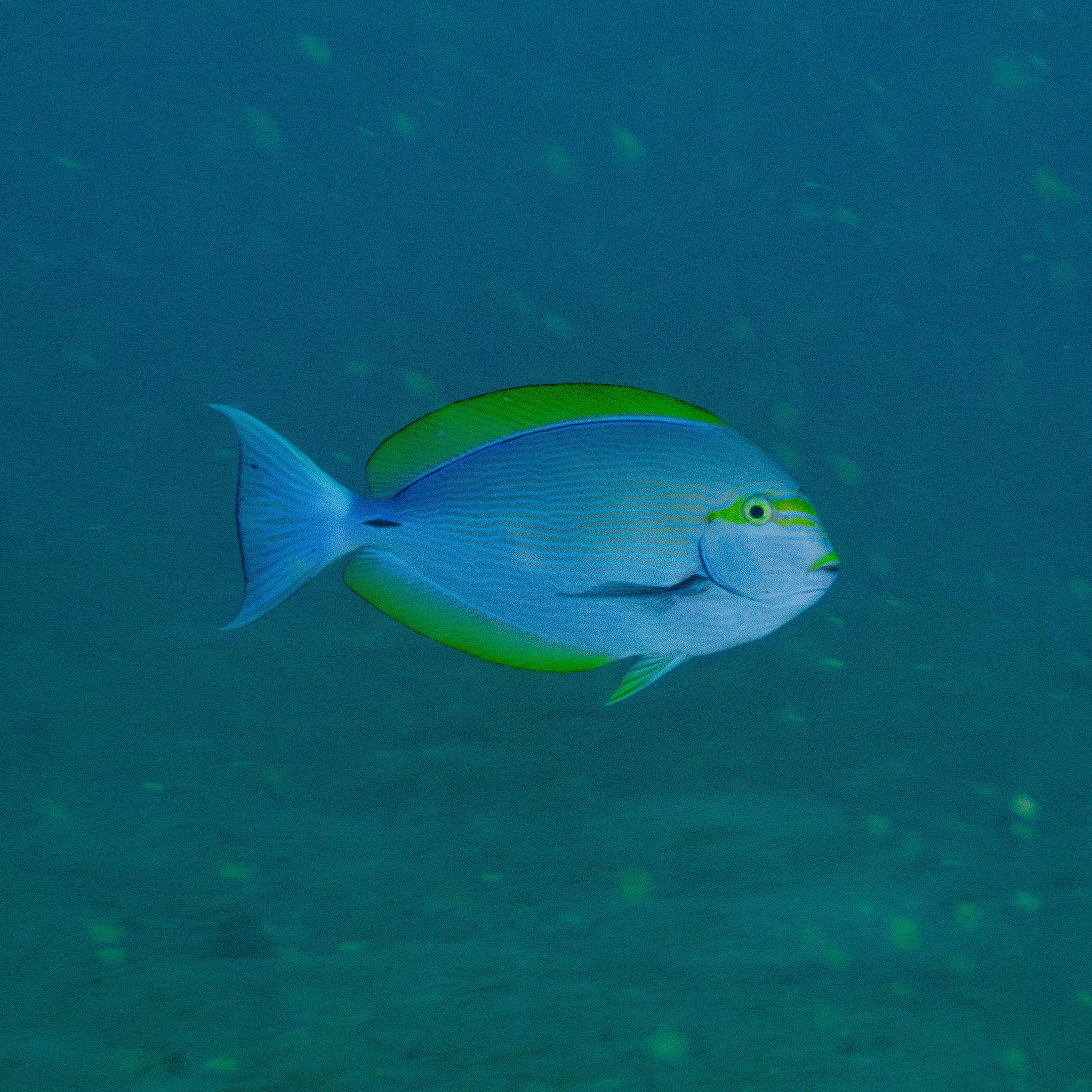
With fins extended

Acanthurus mata has a wide distribution in tropical waters going from the west part of the Indian Ocean to the archipelagos in the middle of Pacific Ocean, so it is widespread all over the Indo-Pacific. It is found from the Red Sea and Gulf of Oman, south to Natal, eastwards to Society and Marquesan Islands, northwards to southern Japan, southwards to New South Wales and New Caledonia. Juveniles occur as far south as Sydney (R. Myers pers. comm. 2010). It is reported from Western Australia (Allen and Swainston 1988), south to Shark Bay. It is not known to occur from the Hawaiian Islands, Pitcairn Islands and Rapa (Randall 2001a). In 2021, the species was recently recorded off the Galápagos Islands in the Tropical Eastern Pacific.

== Habitat ==
Acanthurus mata inhabits usually steep slopes around coral reefs in depth range from 5 to 45m.

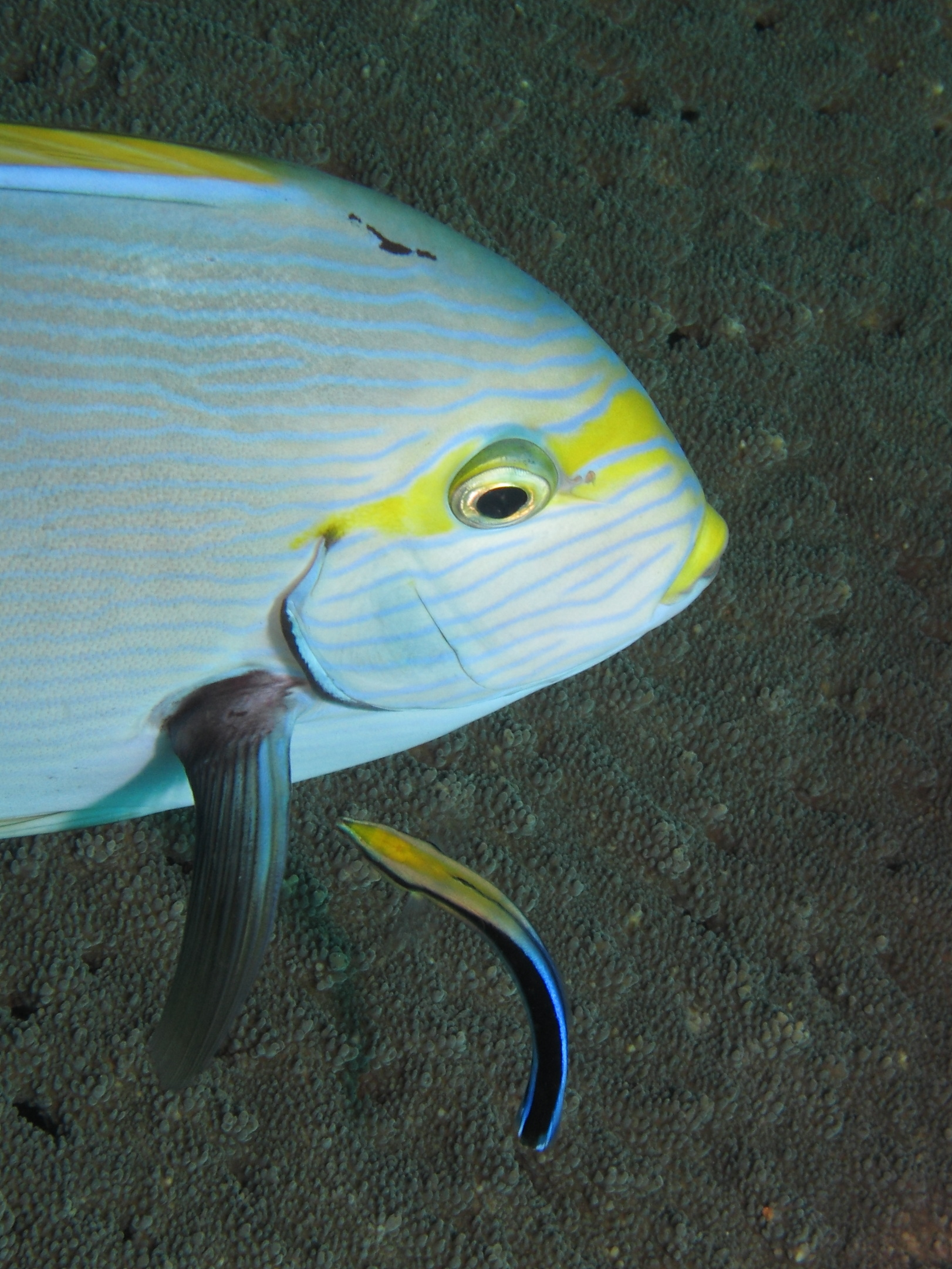
A. mata with a cleaner wrasse (Komodo, Indonesia)

== Feeding ==
Acanthurus mata is a planktivore with a preference for the zooplankton.

== Behaviour ==
Acanthurus mata has a diurnal activity. It is solitary when resting on the reef but may form small aggregation in the open water during feeding.
