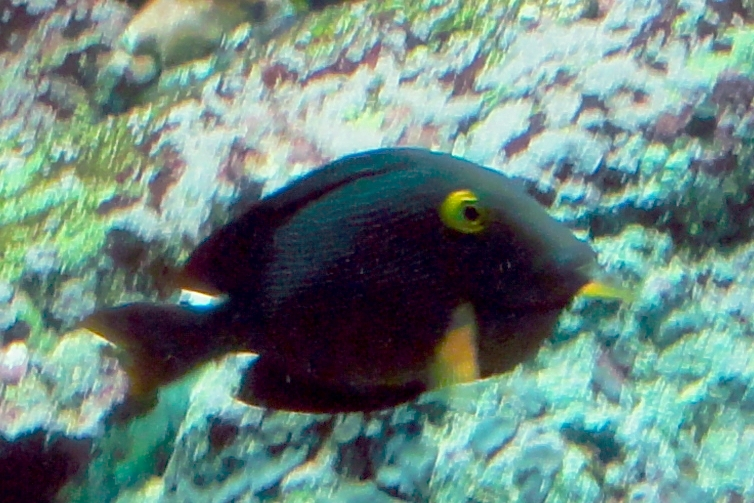

Conservation status
- Least Concern (IUCN 3.1)

Scientific classification
- Kingdom: Animalia
- Phylum: Chordata
- Class: Actinopterygii
- Order: Acanthuriformes
- Family: Acanthuridae
- Genus: Ctenochaetus
- Species: C. marginatus

Binomial name
- Ctenochaetus marginatus (Valenciennes, 1835)

Synonyms
- Acanthurus marginatus Valenciennes, 1835; Ctenochaetus cyanoguttatus Randall, 1955; Ctenochaetus magnus Randall, 1955

= Ctenochaetus marginatus =

Species of fish

Ctenochaetus marginatus, the blue-spotted bristletooth, blue-spotted surgeonfish or striped-fin surgeonfish, is a species of marine ray-finned fish belonging to the biology Acanthuridae which includes the surgeonfishes, unicornfishes and tangs. The blue-spotted bristletooth is found in the central and eastern Pacific Ocean.

== Taxonomy ==
Ctenochaetus marginatus was first formally described as Acanthurus marginatus in 1835 by the French zoologist Achille Valenciennes with its type locality given as Lukonor Island (part of the Federated States of Micronesia) in the Caroline Islands. The genera Ctenochaetus and Acanthurus make up the tribe Acanthurini which is one of three tribes in the subfamily Acanthurinae which is one of two subfamilies in the family Acanthuridae.

== Etymology ==
Ctenochaetus marginatus has the specific name marginatus, meaning "bordered" or "edged", which is a reference to the band on the bases of the dorsal and anal fins.

== Description ==
Ctenochaetus marginatus has its dorsal fin supported by 8 spines and between 26 and 29 soft rays while its anal fin is supported by 3 spines and 24 to 26 soft rays. The shape of the body is a highly laterally compressed, elongated oval with a steep dorsal profile on the head. The eye is positioned high on the head. The small, protrusible mouth has thick lips and there are many flexible teeth with curved tips in each jaw. The overall colour is dark greyish-brown marked with a dense pattern of small blue spots over the head and body. The dorsal, anal, pelvic and caudal fins have blue stripes on them. This species has a maximum published total length of 27 cm (11 in).

== Distribution and habitat ==
Ctenochaetus marginatus has a discontinuous rather localised distribution across the tropical central and eastern Pacific. In the central Pacific it is found in the Marshall, Caroline, Kiribati, Tuvalu, Johnston, Marquesas, Society and Line Islands. While in the tropical eastern Pacific its range runs from Costa Rica south to Colombia, including Clipperton Atoll, Cocos and Gorgona. This is a benthopelagic species found at depths between 2 and 18 m (6 ft 7 in and 59 ft 1 in) on shallow seaward reefs with small schools sometimes occurring in turbulent water in the surge zone where it feeds on algal film.
