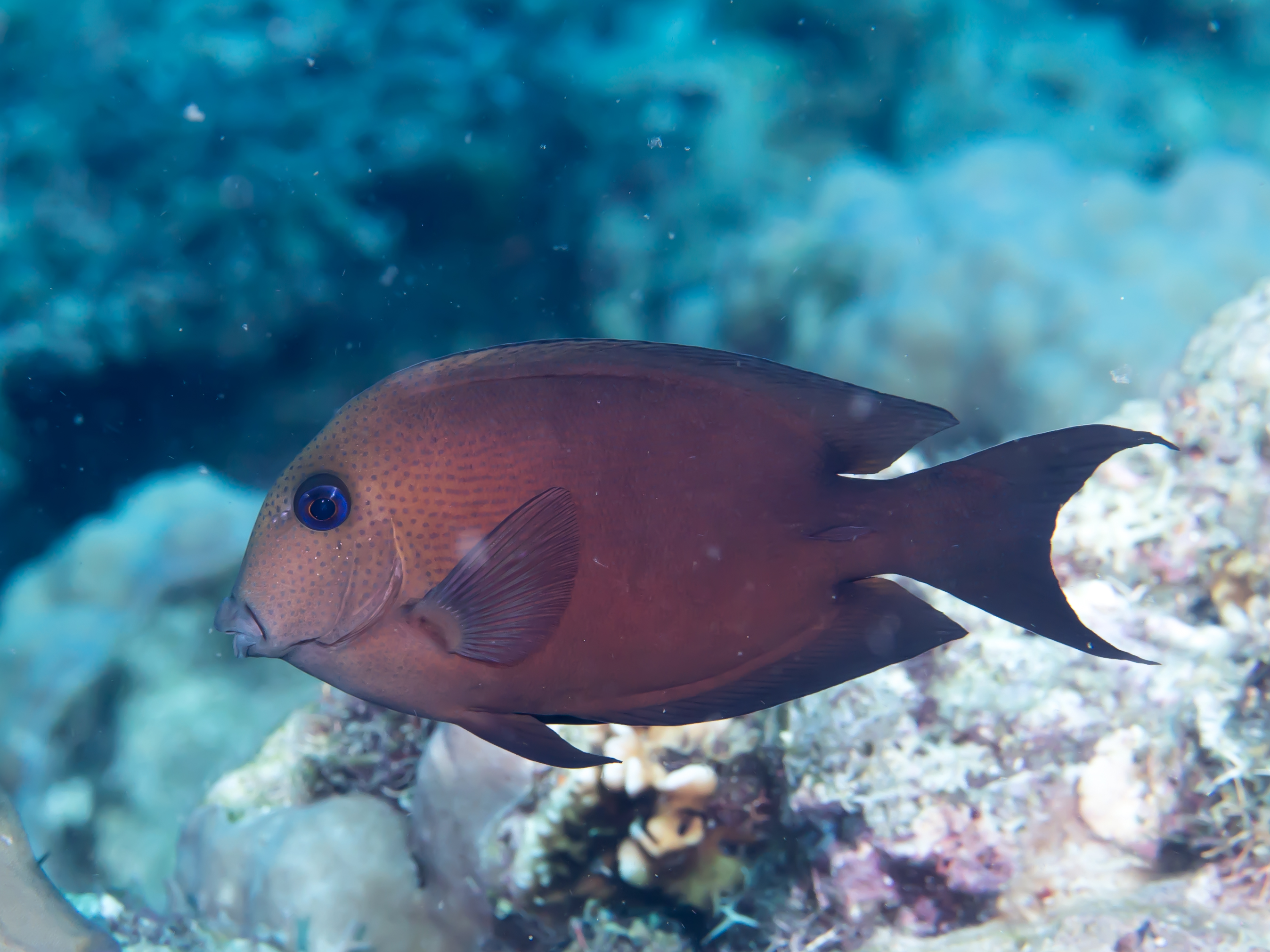

Conservation status
- Least Concern (IUCN 3.1)

Scientific classification
- Kingdom: Animalia
- Phylum: Chordata
- Class: Actinopterygii
- Order: Acanthuriformes
- Family: Acanthuridae
- Genus: Ctenochaetus
- Species: C. binotatus

Binomial name
- Ctenochaetus binotatus J. E. Randall, 1955

Synonyms
- Ctenochaetus oculocoeruleus Fourmanoir, 1966

= Ctenochaetus binotatus =

Species of fish

Ctenochaetus binotatus, the twospot bristletooth or twospot surgeonfish, is a species of marine ray-finned fish belonging to the family Acanthuridae, the surgeonfishes unicornfishes and tangs. This species has a wide Indo-Pacific distribution.

== Taxonomy ==
Ctenochaetus binotatus was first formally described in 1955 by the American ichthyologist John Ernest Randall with its type locality given as Batangas Bay, off the island of Luzon, in the Philippines. The genera Ctenochaetus and Acanthurus make up the tribe Acanthurini, which is one of three tribes in the subfamily Acanthurinae, which is one of the two subfamilies in the family Acanthuridae.

== Etymology ==
The specific name of this species, binotatus, meaning "twice marked", is a reference to the two black spots present on the flanks, one at the axil of the soft-rayed part of the dorsal fin and the other at the rear of the anal fin.

== Description ==
Ctenochaetus binotatus has a dorsal fin which is supported by 8 spines and between 24 and 27 soft rays; for the anal fin the figures are 3 and between 22 and 25 respectively. The depth of the body is more than half of its standard length. In adults, the caudal fin is lunate. The overall colour is brown, but the head and chest are marked with pale spots, and there are pale lines horizontal lines along the flanks. The eyes are blue, and there is an obvious dark spot at the rear axils of both the dorsal and anal fins. This species has a maximum published total length of 22 cm (8.7 in).

== Distribution and habitat ==
Ctenochaetus binotatus has a wide Indo-Pacific distribution. It can be found across the Indian Ocean, from the eastern African coast between Kenya and Sodwana Bay in South Africa all the way to the Andaman Sea, although it is absent off some Asian coasts. In the Pacific Ocean, it can be found as far east as the Tuamotu Islands and Mangareva, and everywhere between southern Japan and New South Wales. It is found at depths of 60 m (200 ft) in areas of coral and rubble, deep lagoons and seaward reefs.

== Biology ==
Ctenochaetus binotatus is typically found singly. These fishes feed by scooping up the film of detritus and single-celled algae, such as the dinoflagellate Gambierdiscus toxicus, which is a producer of the ciguatera toxin. This species is a link in the ciguatera chain.

== Utilisation ==
Ctenochaetus binotatus is traded in the aquarium industry. It is also used as a food fish in some areas, e.g. Thailand.
