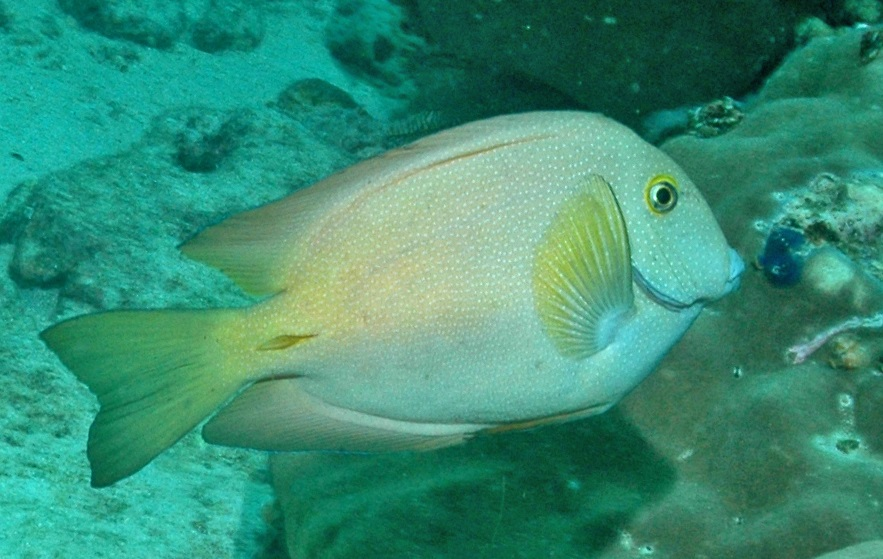
- adult Ctenochaetus truncatus
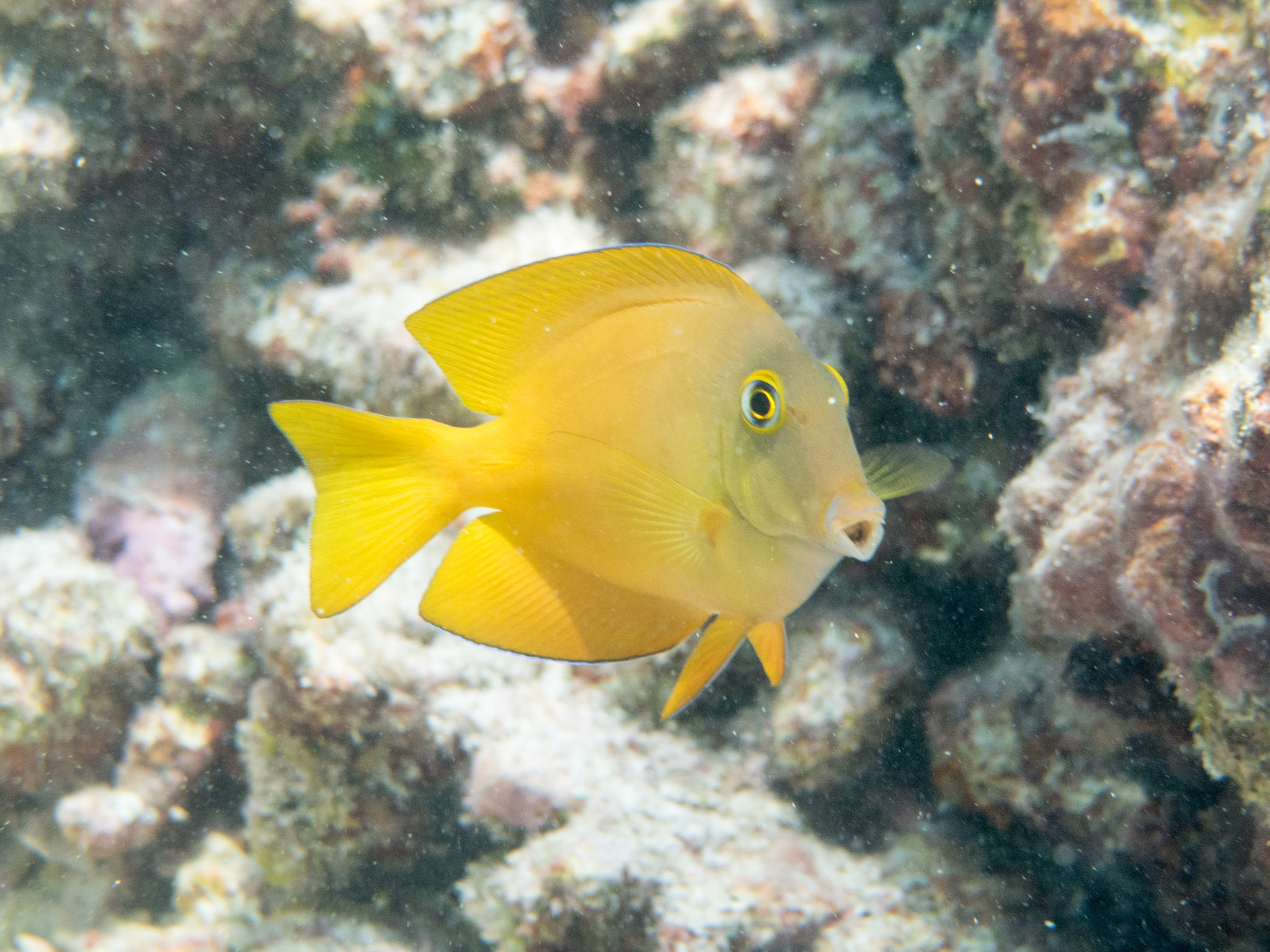
- Juvenile Ctenochaetus truncatus

Conservation status
- Least Concern (IUCN 3.1)

Scientific classification
- Kingdom: Animalia
- Phylum: Chordata
- Class: Actinopterygii
- Order: Acanthuriformes
- Family: Acanthuridae
- Genus: Ctenochaetus
- Species: C. truncatus

Binomial name
- Ctenochaetus truncatus J. E. Randall & Clements, 2001

= Ctenochaetus truncatus =

Species of fish

Ctenochaetus truncatus, the Indian gold-ring bristletooth, squaretail bristletooth, yelloweye bristletooth, truncate bristletooth or spotted yellow eye tang, is a species of marine ray-finned fish belonging to the family Acanthuridae which includes the surgeonfishes, unicornfishes and tangs. This fish is found in the Indian Ocean.

== Taxonomy ==
Ctenochaetus truncatus was first formally described in 2001 by the American ichthyologist John Ernest Randall and the New Zealand biologist Kendall Clements with its type locality given as La Digue in the Seychelles. The genera Ctenochaetus and Acanthurus make up the tribe Acanthurini which is one of three tribes in the subfamily Acanthurinae which is one of two subfamilies in the family Acanthuridae.

== Etymology ==
Ctenochaetus truncatus has the specific name truncatus, a reference to the truncate caudal fin of this fish.

== Description ==
Ctenochaetus truncatus has its dorsal fin supported by 8 spines and between 25 and 27 soft rays while its anal fin is supported by 3 spines and 23 to 25 soft rays. The lips have a margin which is smooth or has small wart-like bumps. The caudal fin is truncate or slightly emarginate. The overall colour of the body is orange-brown with a large number of pale blue to yellow spots on the head, body and base of the dorsal fin. There is a yellow ring around the eye. The caudal, dorsal, anal and pelvic fins have a yellow hue. The juveniles are completely bright yellow. This species has a maximum published standard length of 16 cm (6.3 in).

== Habitat and biology ==
Ctenochaetus truncatus is endemic to the Indian Ocean. It is found along the eastern African coast from Kenya south to KwaZulu-Natal, off southern Oman east across the islands of the Indian Ocean as far as, the Andaman Sea, the Cocos (Keeling) Islands and Christmas Island. This species is found at depths between 1 and 21 m (3 ft 3 in and 68 ft 11 in) over sheltered crests and slopes of reefs, either solitarily or in small aggregations among large corals or in channels.

== Utilisation ==
Ctenochaetus truncatus is a minor part of the aquarium trade. It is targeted as a food fish by fisheries in Thailand but is taken as bycatch elsewhere.
