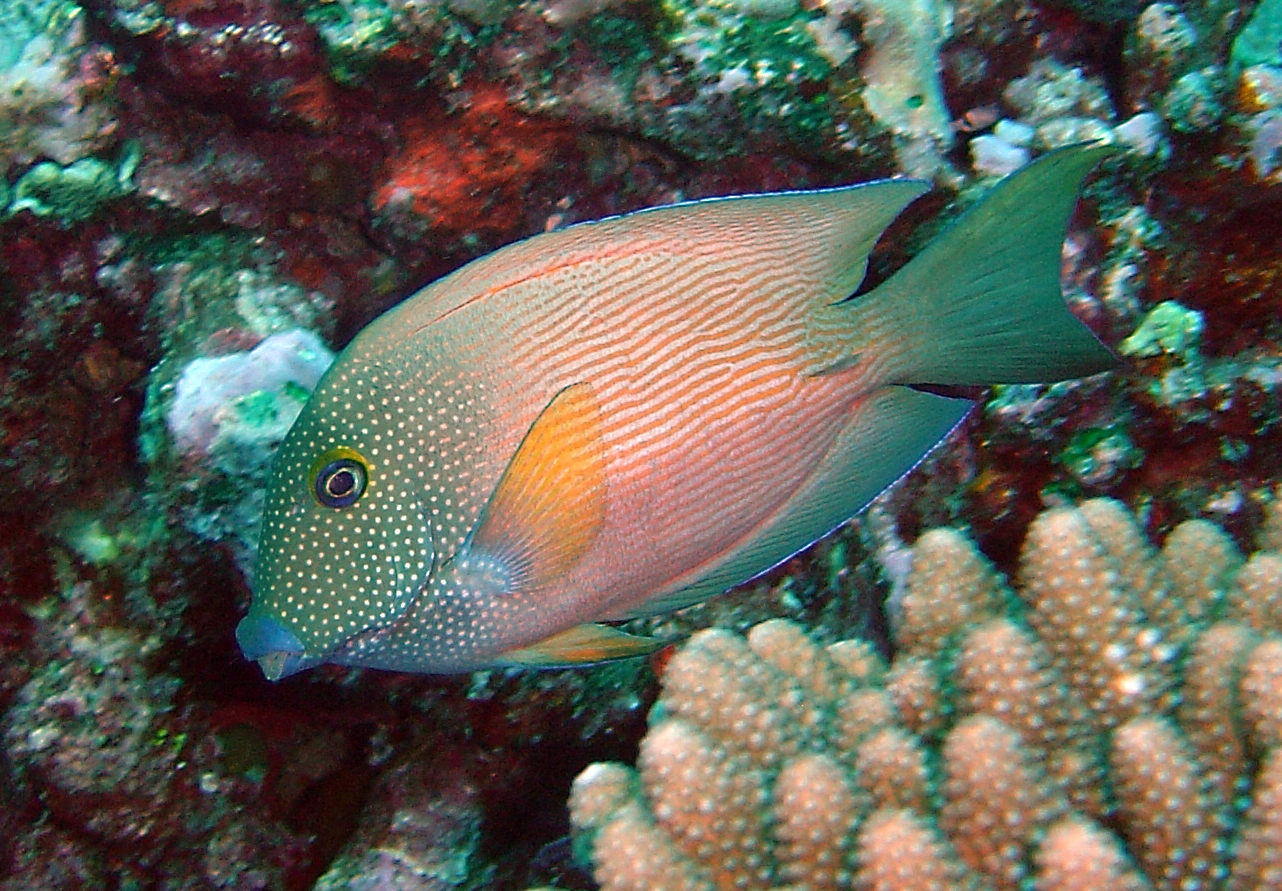

Conservation status
- Least Concern (IUCN 3.1)

Scientific classification
- Kingdom: Animalia
- Phylum: Chordata
- Class: Actinopterygii
- Order: Acanthuriformes
- Family: Acanthuridae
- Genus: Ctenochaetus
- Species: C. cyanocheilus

Binomial name
- Ctenochaetus cyanocheilus J. E. Randall & Clements, 2001

= Ctenochaetus cyanocheilus =

Species of fish

Ctenochaetus cyanocheilus, the bluelip bristletooth, yelloweye bristletooth, goldring bristletooth, Indo-Pacific yellow tang or short-tail bristle-tooth, is a species of marine ray-finned fish belonging to the family Acanthuridae which includes the surgeonfishes, unicornfishes and tangs. This species is found in the Western Pacific Ocean.

== Taxonomy ==
Ctenochaetus cyanocheilus was first formally described in 2001 by the American ichthyologist John Ernest Randall and the New Zealand biologist Kendall Clements with its type locality given as the lagoon between Enewetak and Parry Islands in the Enewetak Atoll, Marshall Islands. The genera Ctenochaetus and Acanthurus make up the tribe Acanthurini which is one of three tribes in the subfamily Acanthurinae which is one of two subfamilies in the family Acanthuridae.

== Etymology ==
Ctenochaetus cyanocheilus has the specific name cyanocheilus, meaning "blue lips", which is a reference to the blue lips this fish shows in life.

== Description ==
Ctenochaetus cyanocheilus has its dorsal fin supported by 8 spines and between 25 and 28 soft rays while the anal fin is supported by 3 spines and between 22 and 26 soft rays. The overall colour is orange to brown with a patch of bluish colour on the breast and thin blue-grey horizontal lines along the body. There are numerous small yellow spots on the head and the anterior part of the body. There is a thin yellow ring around the eyes and the snout is tipped with blue lips. The dorsal and anal fins are brown with the dorsal fin having blue lines which extend from the body. The caudal fin is emarginate. Juveniles are yellow. This species has a maximum published standard length of 16 cm (6.3 in).

== Distribution and habitat ==
Ctenochaetus cyanocheilus is found in the Western Pacific Ocean from Sumatra and Peninsular Malaysia east to American Samoa and the Line Islands, north to the Ogasawara Islands of Japan and south to New Caledonia, Tonga and the Great Barrier Reef. The yelloweye bristletooth is found solitarily at depths between 1 and 60 m (3 ft 3 in and 196 ft 10 in) on areas of dense coral growth on inner and outer reefs, grazing on algae.
