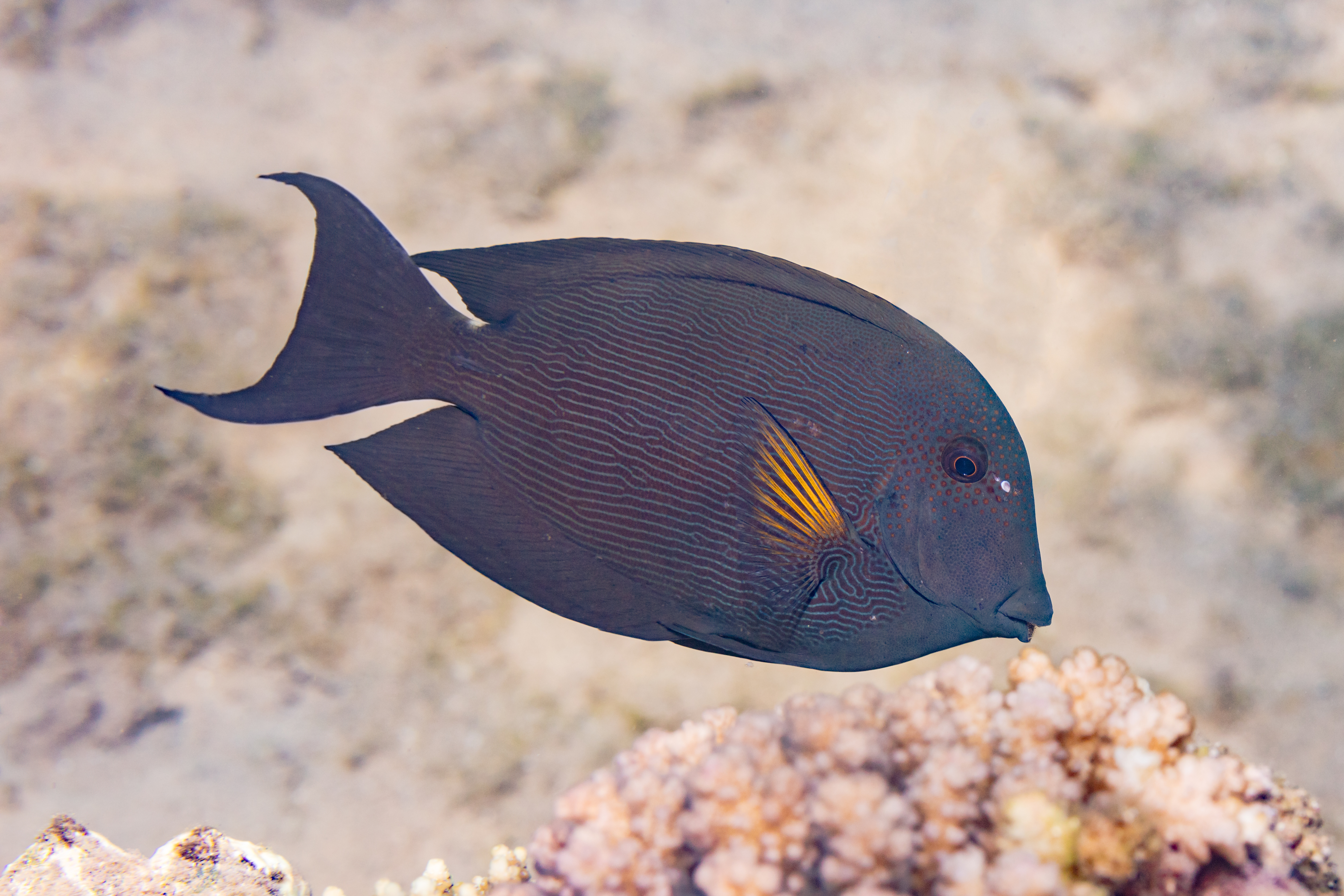
- In the Red Sea

Conservation status
- Least Concern (IUCN 3.1)

Scientific classification
- Kingdom: Animalia
- Phylum: Chordata
- Class: Actinopterygii
- Order: Acanthuriformes
- Family: Acanthuridae
- Genus: Ctenochaetus
- Species: C. striatus

Binomial name
- Ctenochaetus striatus (Quoy & Gaimard, 1825)

Synonyms
- List: Acanthurus striatus Quoy & Gaimard, 1825; Acanthurus argenteus Quoy & Gaimard, 1825; Acronurus argenteus (Quoy & Gaimard, 1825); Acanthurus flavoguttatus Kittlitz, 1834; Acanthurus ketlitzii Valenciennes, 1835; Acanthurus ctenodon Valenciennes, 1835; Ctenodon ctenodon (Valenciennes, 1835); Ctenodon cuvierii Swainson, 1839

= Ctenochaetus striatus =

Species of fish

Ctenochaetus striatus, the striated surgeonfish, lined bristletooth, fine-lined bristletooth or striped bristletooth, is a species of marine ray-finned fish belonging to the family Acanthuridae, the surgeonfishes, unicornfishes and tangs. This species has a wide Indo-Pacific distribution.

== Taxonomy ==
Ctenochaetus striatus was first formally described as Acanthurus striatus in 1825 by the French naturalists Jean René Constant Quoy and Joseph Paul Gaimard with its type locality given as Guam in the Marianas Islands. The genera Ctenochaetus and Acanthurus make up the tribe Acanthurini which is one of three tribes in the subfamily Acanthurinae which is one of two subfamilies in the family Acanthuridae.

== Etymology ==
Ctenochaetus striatus has the specific name striatus, meaning "furrowed" or "grooved", or in other words "striped". This alludes to the many longitudinal stripes created by the edges of the scale rows and which extend onto the dorsal and anal fin beses.

== Description ==
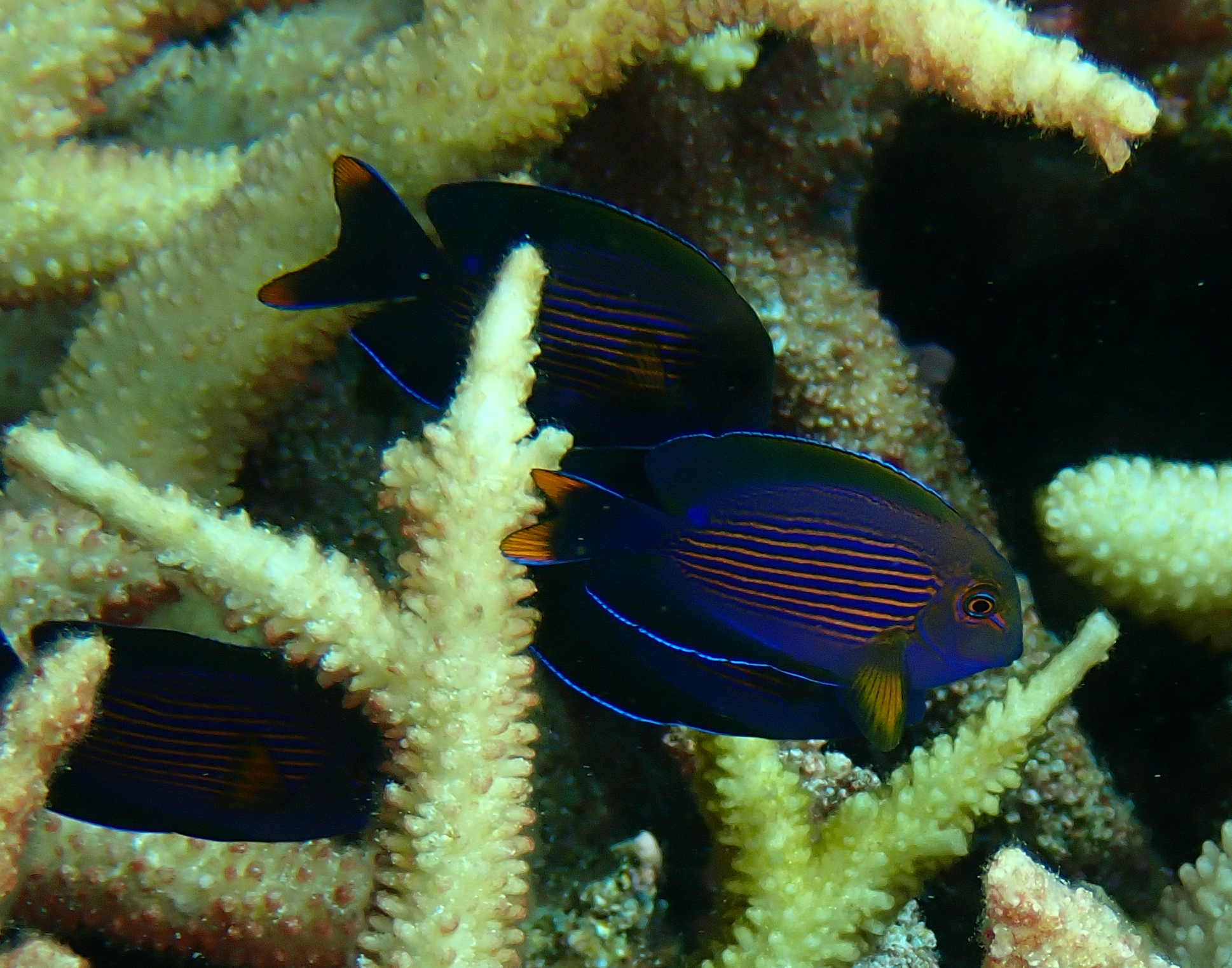
Juveniles

Ctenochaetus striatus has its dorsal fin supported by 8 spines and between 27 and 31 soft rays while its anal fin is supported by 3 spines and 24 to 28 soft rays. The overall colour is greenish-brown with slender, sinuous blue lines along the flanks and many orange spots on the head. The blue lines continue on the dorsal and anal fins. This species has a maximum published total length of 26 cm (10 in).

== Distribution and habitat ==
Ctenochaetus striatus has a wide range across the Indian and Pacific Oceans from the coast of eastern Africa from the Red Sea south to Aliwal Shoal off South Africa. They are then found across the Indian Ocean, although not on the mainland coast of South Asia between the Gulf of Oman and the Bay of Bengal, and into the Pacific Ocean east to Pitcairn Island and French Polynesia, north to the Ryukyu Islands of southern Japan and south to Rapa Iti and the Elizabeth and Middleton Reefs in the Coral Sea. The striated surgeon fish is found in reef flats and lagoon and seaward reefs over coral, rock pavement and rubble at depths between 0 and 60 m (0 and 197 ft).

== Biology ==
Ctenochaetus striatus is encountered solitarily or in small to very large, frequently mixed-species schools. It grazes on the surface film of blue-green algae and diatoms and also on various small invertebrates. This species is a key link in the food chain of ciguatera and it has been found that the incidence of ciguatrera poisoning in Rarotonga has decreased as the frequency of Pacific cyclones had decreased. The cyclones disturb the reef which results in increased population of herbivorous fishes such as the striated surgeonfish and a greater risk of humans suffering ciguatera poisoning.

Spawning is linked to the full moon and these fishes gather in large aggregations to spawn. The fish sit still in the water for between 1 and 3 hours, changing colour to grey before a handful of fishes rise towards the surface and circle around each other discharging milt and eggs.

When compared to other coral-fish larvae, the striated surgeonfish uniquely exhibits a non-selective attraction to noisy areas, where others are repelled or are selectively attracted to specific sounds.

== Utilisation ==
Ctenochaetus striatus is targeted as a food fish using traps and nets. It is also captured for the aquarium trade.
