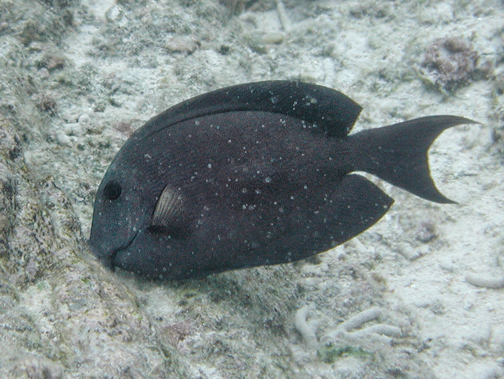

Conservation status
- Least Concern (IUCN 3.1)

Scientific classification
- Kingdom: Animalia
- Phylum: Chordata
- Class: Actinopterygii
- Order: Acanthuriformes
- Family: Acanthuridae
- Genus: Ctenochaetus
- Species: C. hawaiiensis

Binomial name
- Ctenochaetus hawaiiensis J. E. Randall, 1955

= Ctenochaetus hawaiiensis =

Species of fish

Ctenochaetus hawaiiensis (common names include chevron tang, black surgeonfish, Hawaiian bristletooth, Hawaiian kole and Hawaiian surgeonfish) is a species of marine ray-finned fish belonging to the family Acanthuridae. It is found in the tropical Pacific Ocean.

== Taxonomy ==
Ctenochaetus hawaiiensis was first formally described in 1955 by the American ichthyologist John Ernest Randall with its type locality given as the entrance to Keauhou Bay on Hawaii Island. The genera Ctenochaetus and Acanthurus make up the tribe Acanthurini, which is one of three tribes in the subfamily Acanthurinae, which is one of two subfamilies in the family Acanthuridae.

== Description ==
Ctenochaetus hawaiiensis has a maximum published total length of 25 cm (9.8 in). The dorsal fin is supported by 8 spines and between 27 and 29 soft rays, and the anal fin is supported by 3 spines and 25 or 26 soft rays. Adults look black from a distance, but upon close inspection, one sees that the uniform colour is broken by many thin green longitudinal stripes. Juveniles have very different color patterns from adults on the flanks, as they are of a bright orange-red color overall, and have many dark chevron markings (for this reason, one of the common names of this species is chevron tang). Juveniles also have deeper bodies.

== Distribution and habitat ==
Ctenochaetus hawaiiensis has a wide distribution in the tropical Pacific Ocean, from the Ryukyu Islands of southern Japan in the west to as far as Hawaii in the east, through most of Micronesia and French Polynesia (and as far south as the Pitcairn Islands and Rapa Iti). This is an uncommon species of seaward reefs, both rock and coral reefs, with the juveniles typically occurring in deeper waters rich in corals.

== Utilization ==
Ctenochaetus hawaiienis is popular in the aquarium trade due to the color patterns of the juveniles. It is the fifth most exported aquarium fish in Hawaii.
