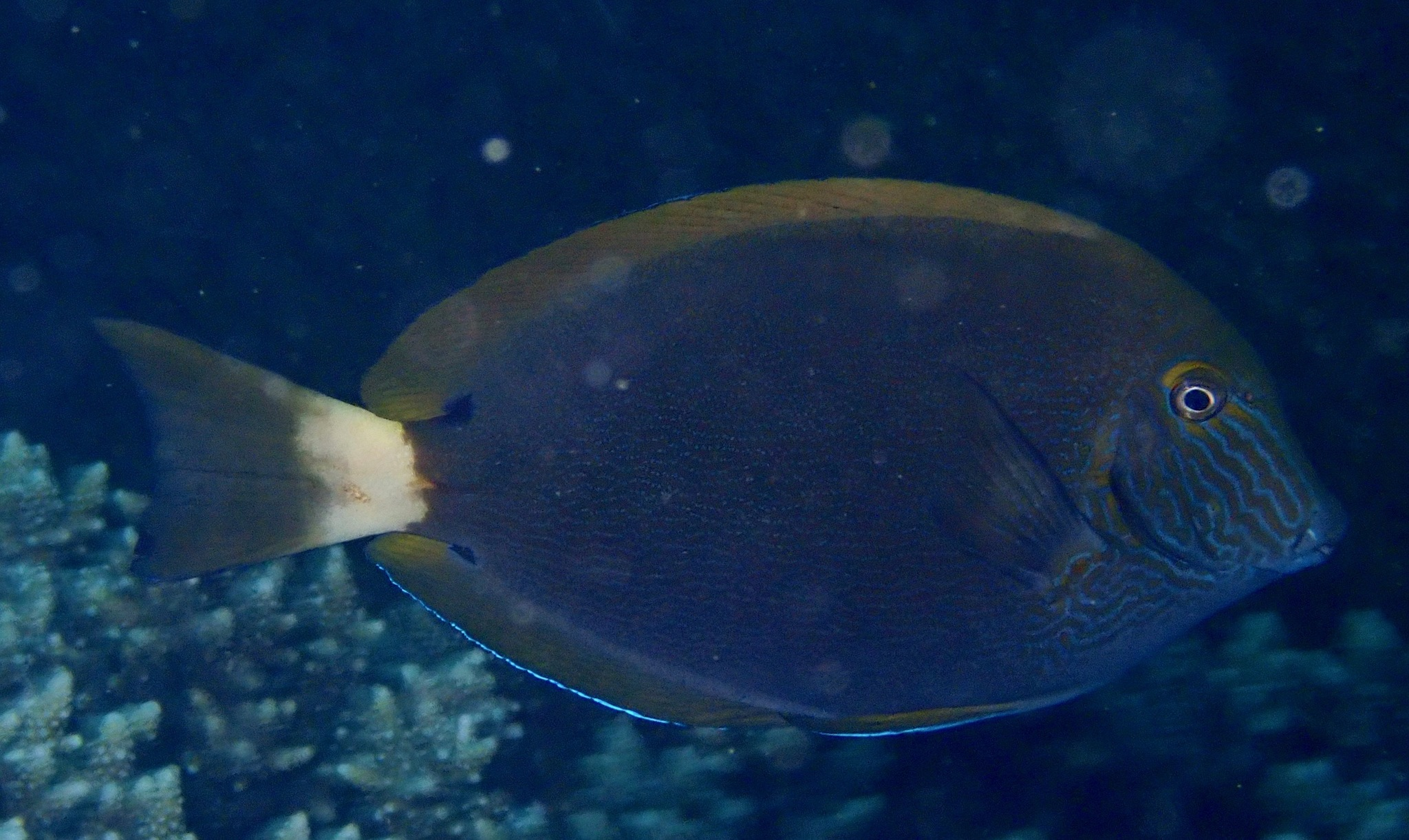

Scientific classification
- Kingdom: Animalia
- Phylum: Chordata
- Class: Actinopterygii
- Order: Acanthuriformes
- Family: Acanthuridae
- Genus: Acanthurus
- Species: A. nigros

Binomial name
- Acanthurus nigros Günther, 1861

Synonyms
- Acanthurus bipunctatus Günther, 1861

= Grey-head surgeonfish =

Species of fish

The grey-head surgeonfish (Acanthurus nigros) is a species of marine ray-finned fish belonging to the family Acanthuridae which includes the surgeonfishes. unicornfishes and tangs. This species has a wide Indo-Pacific distribution.

== Taxonomy ==
The grey-head surgeonfish was first formally described in 1861 by the German-born British herpetologist and ichthyologist Albert Günther with its type locality given as Aneityum Island in Vanuatu. In 1956 John E. Randall reviewed the genus Acanthurus and placed Günther's A. nigros in synonymy with A. nigroris which had been described by Achille Valenciennes from Hawaii in 1835 but in 2011 workers, including Randall, have argued that genetic differences support the validity of A. nigros as a separate species from A. nigroris. The genus Acanthurus is one of two genera in the tribe Acanthurini which is one of three tribes in the subfamily Acanthurinae which is one of two subfamilies in the family Acanthuridae.

== Etymology ==
The grey-head surgeonfish has the specific name nigros, which means "black", and is an allusion to the black anal, caudal and dorsal fins and the black spot to the rear of the base of the dorsal and anal fins.

== Description ==
The grey-head surgeonfish has its dorsal fin supported by 9 spines and between 24 and 27 soft rays while its anal fin is supported by 3 spines and 22-25 soft rays. It also has a anterior gill raker count of between 21 and 25. The overall colour of the body is pale to dark brown, with slightly irregular, horizontal, dotted blue lines thinner than the brown spaces between them. There are blue lines on the head below the eye and on the gill cover which run parallel to the snout. There is a black spot with a diameter less than half that of the eye at the posterior of both the dorsal and anal fins. There is frequently a thick whitish bar on the caudal peduncle. The dorsal and anal fins have horizontal reddish brown bands and a slender blue margin.

== Distribution ==
The grey-head surgeonfish is found in the western Pacific Ocean from the Great Barrier Reef and Caroline Islands east to the Pitcairn Islands.
