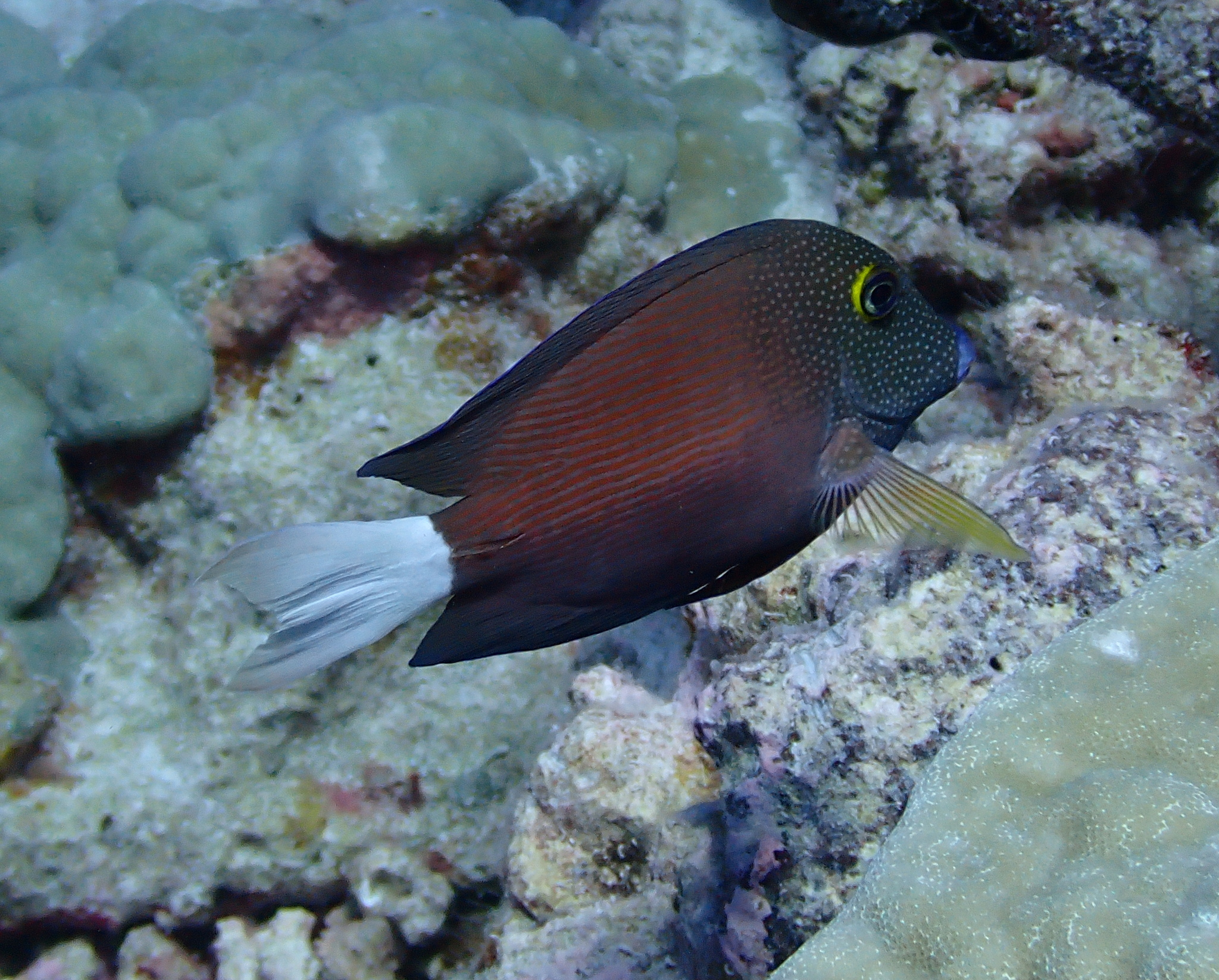

Conservation status
- Least Concern (IUCN 3.1)

Scientific classification
- Kingdom: Animalia
- Phylum: Chordata
- Class: Actinopterygii
- Order: Acanthuriformes
- Family: Acanthuridae
- Genus: Ctenochaetus
- Species: C. flavicauda

Binomial name
- Ctenochaetus flavicauda Fowler, 1938

= Ctenochaetus flavicauda =

Species of tang from the Pacific ocean

Ctenochaetus flavicauda, the whitetail bristletooth or redspotted tang, is a species of marine ray-finned fish belonging to the family Acanthuridae which includes the surgeonfishes, unicornfishes and tangs. It is found in the western central Pacific Ocean.

== Taxonomy ==
Ctenochaetus flavicauda was first formally described in 1938 by the American zoologist Henry Weed Fowler with its type locality given as Takaroa in the Tuamotu Islands of French Polynesia. The type specimen was collected on the George Vanderbilt South Pacific Expedition of 1937. The genera Ctenochaetus and Acanthurus make up the tribe Acanthurini which is one of three tribes in the subfamily Acanthurinae which is one of two subfamilies in the family Acanthuridae.

== Etymology ==
Ctenochaetus flavicauda has the specific name flavicauda, meaning "yellow tail", which is a reference to what Fowler described as its "brilliant yellow caudal fin", although subsequent authors have described the caudal fin as pure white.

== Distribution and habitat ==
Ctenochaetus flavicauda occurs in the central Pacific Ocean from the Phoenix Islands north to the Line Islands, east to the Pitcairn Islands, south to the Austral Islands and Rapa Iti. It is found on coral reefs down to depths of 30 m (98 ft).

== Description ==
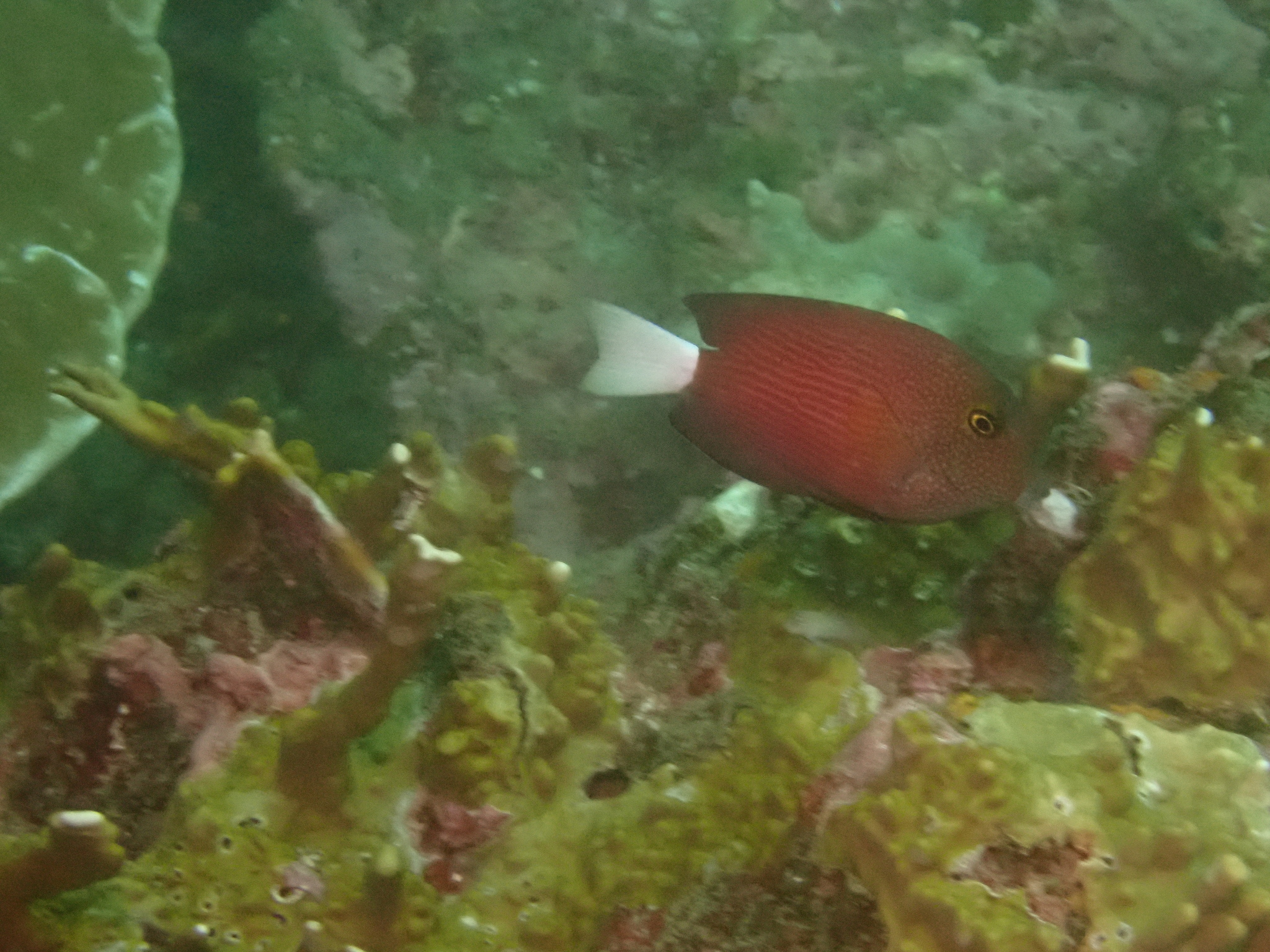
In French Polynesia

Ctenochaetus flavicauda has its dorsal fin supported by 8 spines and between 26 and 28 soft rays while its anal fin is supported by 3 spines and 23 to 26 soft rays. This species has a maximum published total length of 16 cm (6.3 in).

The overall colour is reddish marked with many blue spots on the head and these change into blue lines on the body. The brilliant white caudal fin contrasts sharply with the rest of the body.
