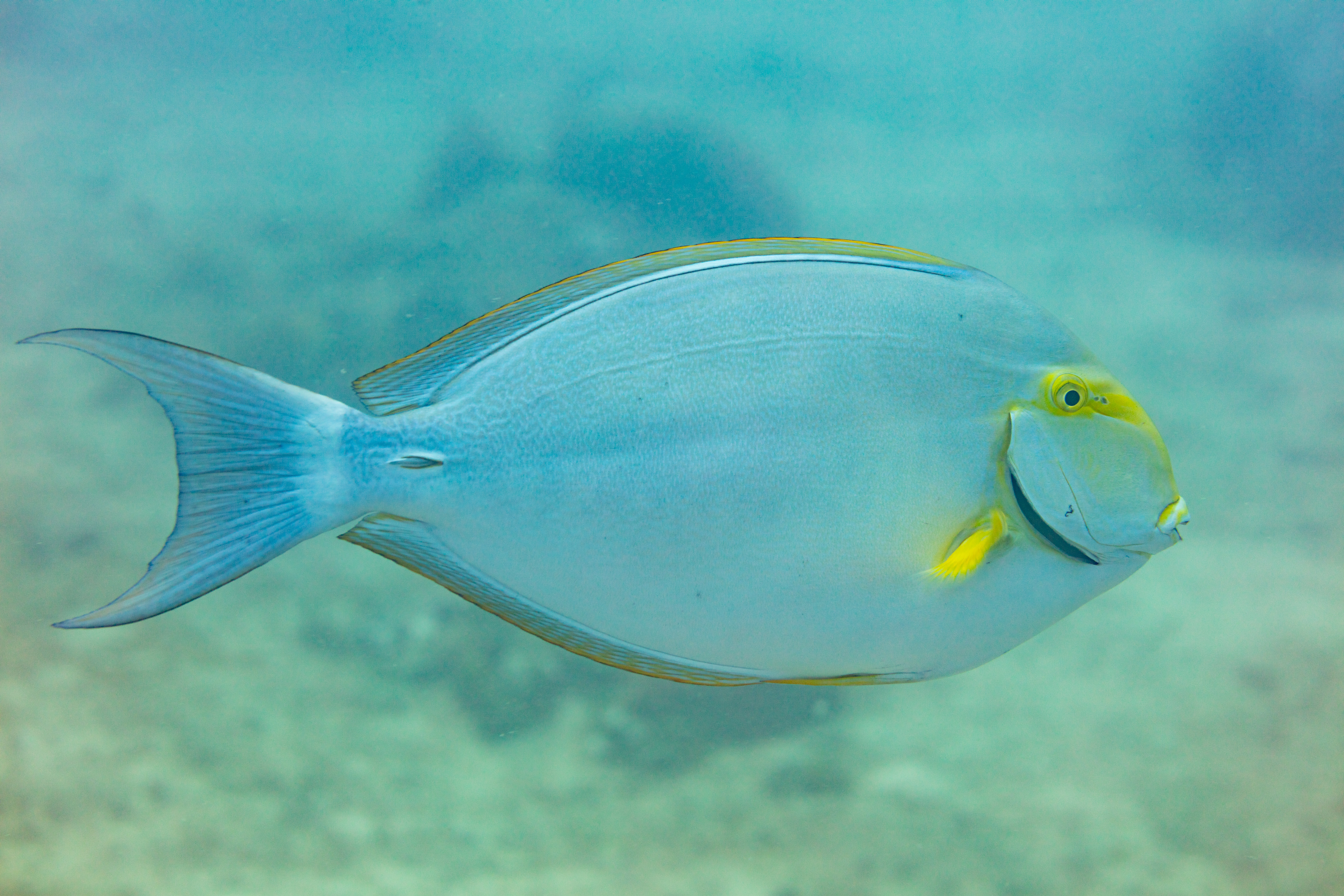

Conservation status
- Least Concern (IUCN 3.1)

Scientific classification
- Kingdom: Animalia
- Phylum: Chordata
- Class: Actinopterygii
- Division: Teleostei
- Order: Acanthuriformes
- Family: Acanthuridae
- Genus: Acanthurus
- Species: A. xanthopterus

Binomial name
- Acanthurus xanthopterus Valenciennes, 1835

Synonyms
- List: Hepatus xanthopterus (Valenciennes, 1835); Teuthis xanthopterus (Valenciennes, 1835); Acanthurus rasi Valenciennes, 1835; Teuthis crestonis Jordan & Starks, 1895; Acanthurus crestonis (Jordan & Starks, 1895); Hepatus crestonis (Jordan & Starks, 1895); Teuthis guentheri Jenkins, 1903; Hepatus aquilinus Jordan & Seale, 1906; Acanthurus reticulatus Shen & Lim, 1973

= Acanthurus xanthopterus =

Species of fish

Acanthurus xanthopterus, the yellowfin surgeonfish, yellowmask surgeonfish, ringtail surgeonfish or Cuvier's surgeonfish, is a species of marine ray-finned fish belonging to the family Acanthuridae which includes the surgeonfishes, unicornfishes and tangs. This species has a wide Indo-Pacific distribution.

== Taxonomy ==
Acanthurus xanthopterus was first formally described in 1835 by the French zoologist Achille Valenciennes with its type locality given as Seychelles. The genus Acanthurus is one of two genera in the tribe Acanthurini which is one of three tribes in the subfamily Acanthurinae which is one of two subfamilies in the family Acanthuridae.

== Description ==
Acanthurus xanthopterus ranges in length to 70 cm (28 in). It has eight or 9 dorsal spines, 25–27 dorsal soft rays, three anal spines, 23–25 anal soft rays, and 16–24 anterior and 17–22 posterior gill rakers.

Its body is purplish gray. It has a region of dull yellow in front of its eye. The outer third of its pectoral fin is yellow, the extreme distal part is hyaline. Its dorsal and anal fins are yellowish grey basally and dull yellow distally. Its caudal fin is purplish and the caudal spine is small.

== Range and habitat ==
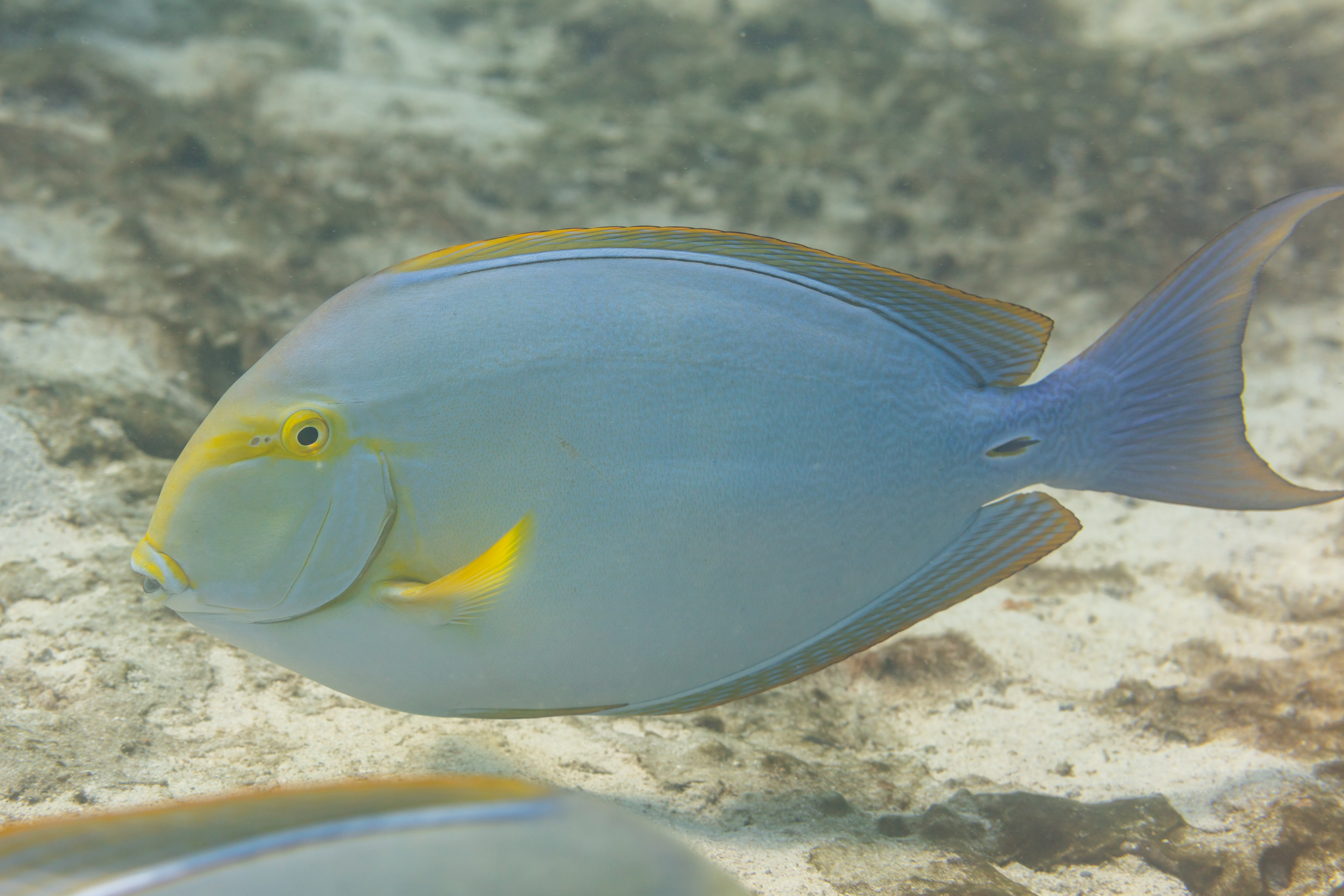
A. xanthopterus from Madagascar

Acanthurus xanthopterus lives near coral reefs at depths ranging from 5–90 m (16–295 ft). Its preferred temperatures are 24–28 °C (75–82 °F) at latitudes of 30°N to 30°S. It ranges from East Africa to the Hawaiian Islands and French Polynesia, north to southern Japan, south to the Great Barrier Reef, and New Caledonia, and in the Eastern Pacific, from the lower Gulf of California and Clipperton Island to Panama and the Galapagos Islands.

Juveniles inhabit shallow, protected, turbid inshore waters, while adults prefer deeper areas of protected bays and lagoons.

== Feeding ==
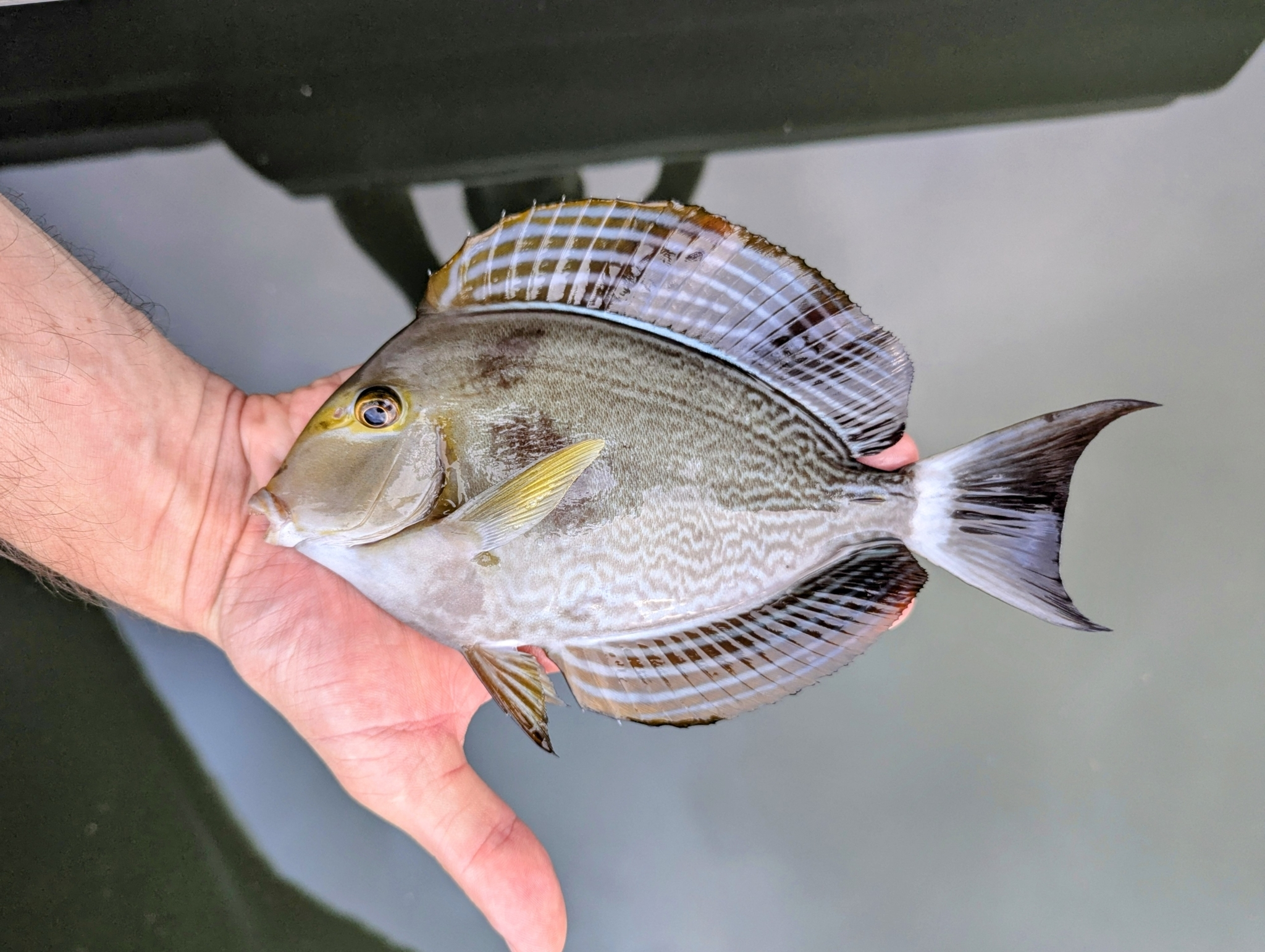
In Mauritius

Acanthurus xanthopterus feeds on diatoms, detritus film of sand, filamentous algae, hydroids, and pieces of fish. It is probably the only surgeonfish that readily takes bait.
