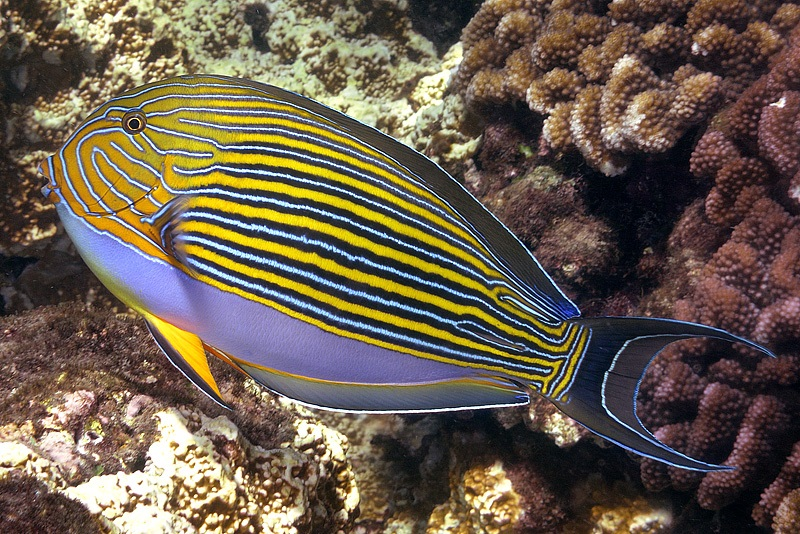

Conservation status
- Least Concern (IUCN 3.1)

Scientific classification
- Kingdom: Animalia
- Phylum: Chordata
- Class: Actinopterygii
- Division: Teleostei
- Order: Acanthuriformes
- Family: Acanthuridae
- Genus: Acanthurus
- Species: A. lineatus

Binomial name
- Acanthurus lineatus (Linnaeus, 1758)

Synonyms
- List: Chaetodon lineatus Linnaeus, 1758; Ctenodon lineatus (Linnaeus, 1758); Harpurus lineatus (Linnaeus, 1758); Hepatus lineatus (Linnaeus, 1758); Rhombotides lineatus (Linnaeus, 1758); Teuthis lineatus (Linnaeus, 1758); Acanthurus vittatus Bennett, 1828

= Acanthurus lineatus =

Species of fish

Acanthurus lineatus, the lined surgeonfish, blue banded surgeonfish, blue-lined surgeonfish (a name also used for Acanthurus nigroris and Acanthurus mata), clown surgeonfish, pyjama tang, striped surgeonfish, and zebra surgeonfish, is a species of marine ray-finned fish belonging to the family Acanthuridae, the surgeonfishes, unicornfishes and tangs. This species is found in the Indo-Pacific region.

== Taxonomy ==
Acanthurus lineatus was first formally described as Chaetodon lineatus by Linnaeus in the 10th edition of Systema Naturae published in 1758 with its type locality given as "Indies". The genus Acanthurus is one of two genera in the tribe Acanthurini which is one of three tribes in the subfamily Acanthurinae which is one of two subfamilies in the family Acanthuridae.

== Etymology ==
Acanthurus lineatus has the specific name lineatus, meaning "lined", a reference to the yellow and black lines on the body of this fish.

== Description ==
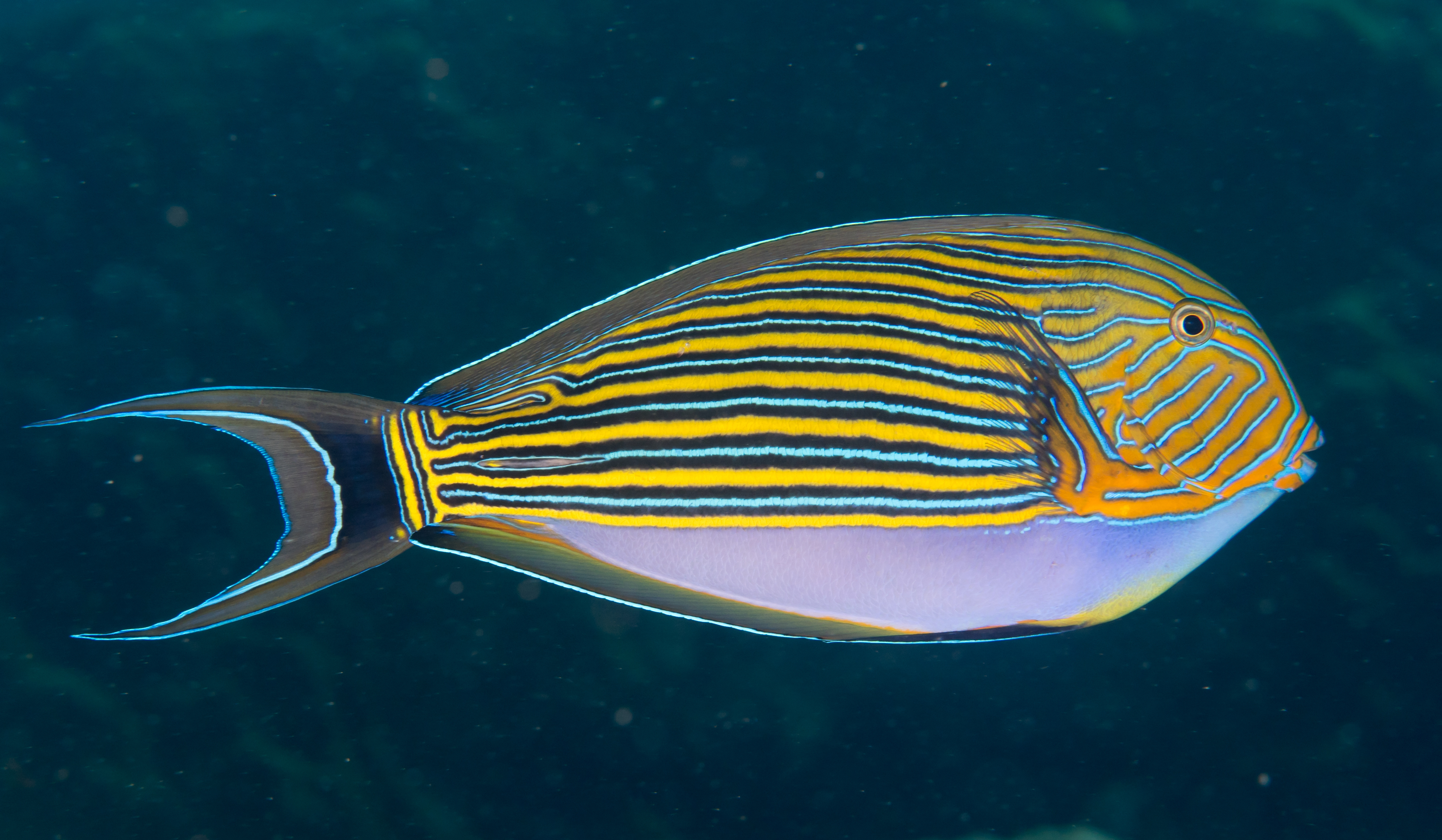
Adult

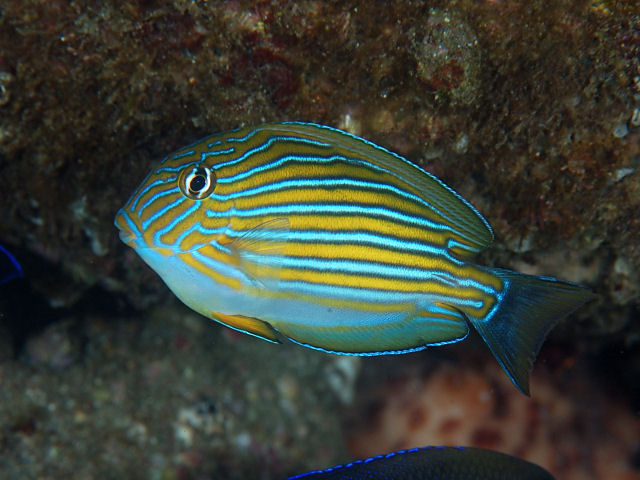
Juvenile

This species reaches about 38 centimeters in length. Much of the body has black-edged blue and yellow stripes, and the top of the head is striped with yellow. The belly is grayish. The pectoral fins have darkened rays and the pelvic fins are yellow-brown with black margins. Individuals from around the Philippines vary in coloration. A. lineatus, like other surgeonfish, possesses a sharp spine on either side of the tail base, but unlike in other surgeonfish, the spines are venomous and capable of inflicting painful wounds on handlers.

== Distribution ==
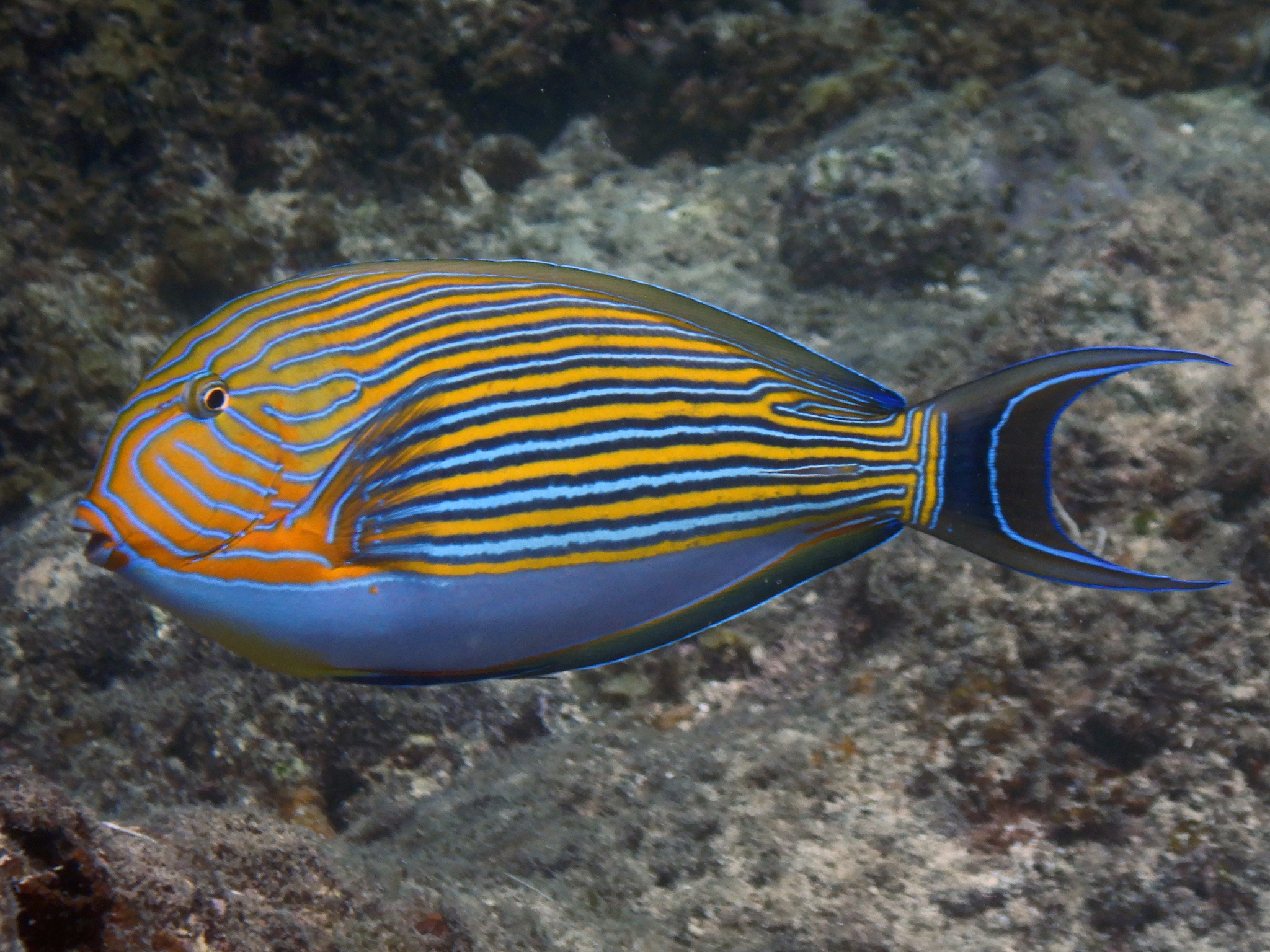
In Kenya

A. lineatus occurs in the Indian Ocean from East Africa to the western Pacific Ocean to the Great Barrier Reef, Japan, Polynesia, and Hawaii.

== Habitat ==
The lined surgeonfish is associated with reefs, living in marine waters just a few meters deep. It is benthopelagic.

== Behaviour ==
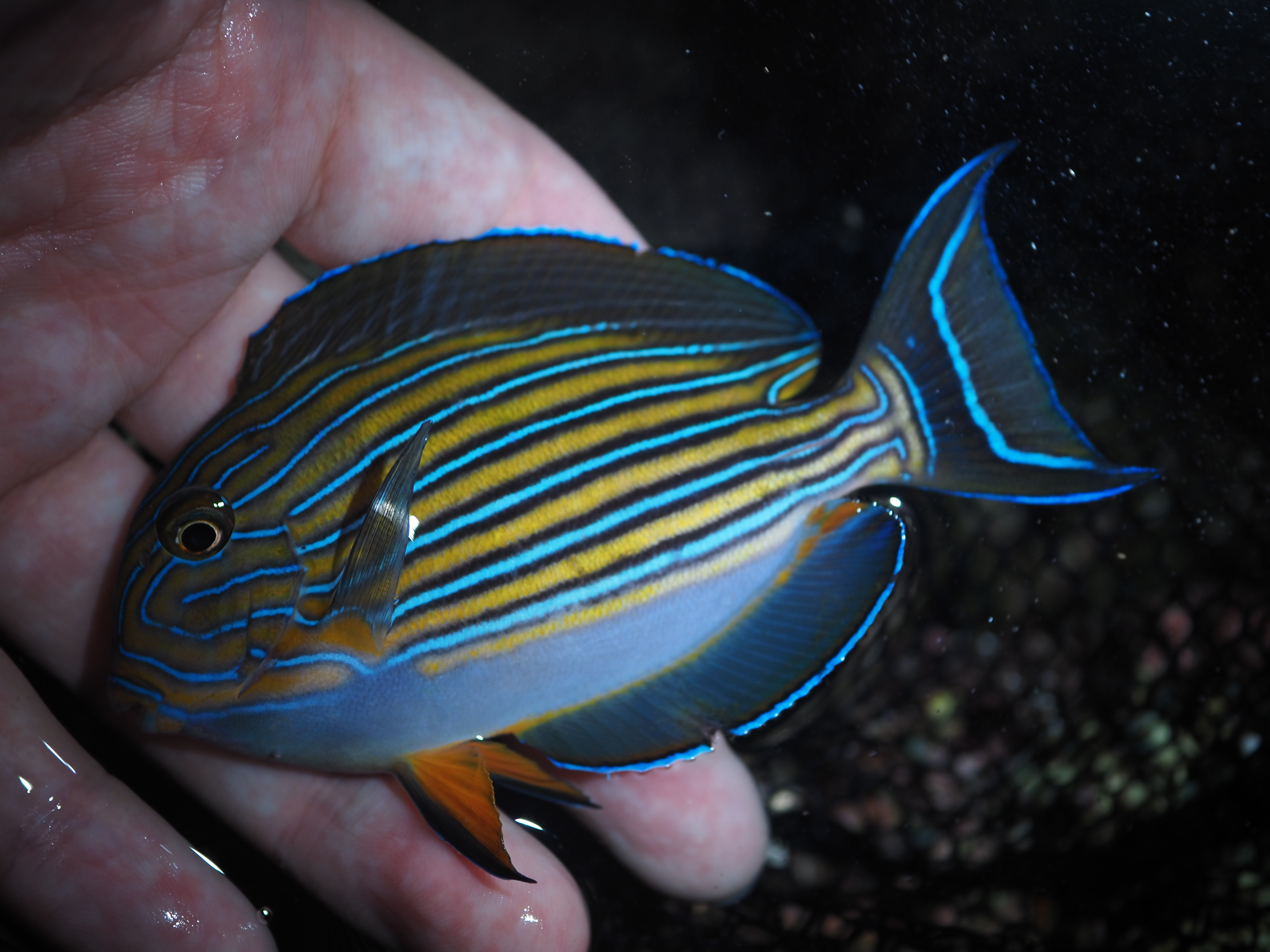
Juvenile, in Japan

The fish is territorial, with a large male defending a feeding territory and a harem of females. The adults may also school, and they gather en masse during spawning. The juvenile is solitary. The fish is mostly herbivorous, but might eat crustaceans at times. Most of its diet is algae. It grazes during the day.

Acanthurus lineatus species found in Australia, in the Indian Ocean have a greater defense rate against intruders. Lined surgeonfish in the Indian Ocean have a smaller body size, allowing them to have greater access and abundance of food, due to hurricane damage to reefs, enhancing the overall algal turfs that Acanthurus lineatus feed on.

== Human uses ==
This species is of commercial and ornamental value. It is especially important among the reef fishes of American Samoa. In some areas it is heavily exploited, but it lives in many protected zones and in general it is widespread and common.
