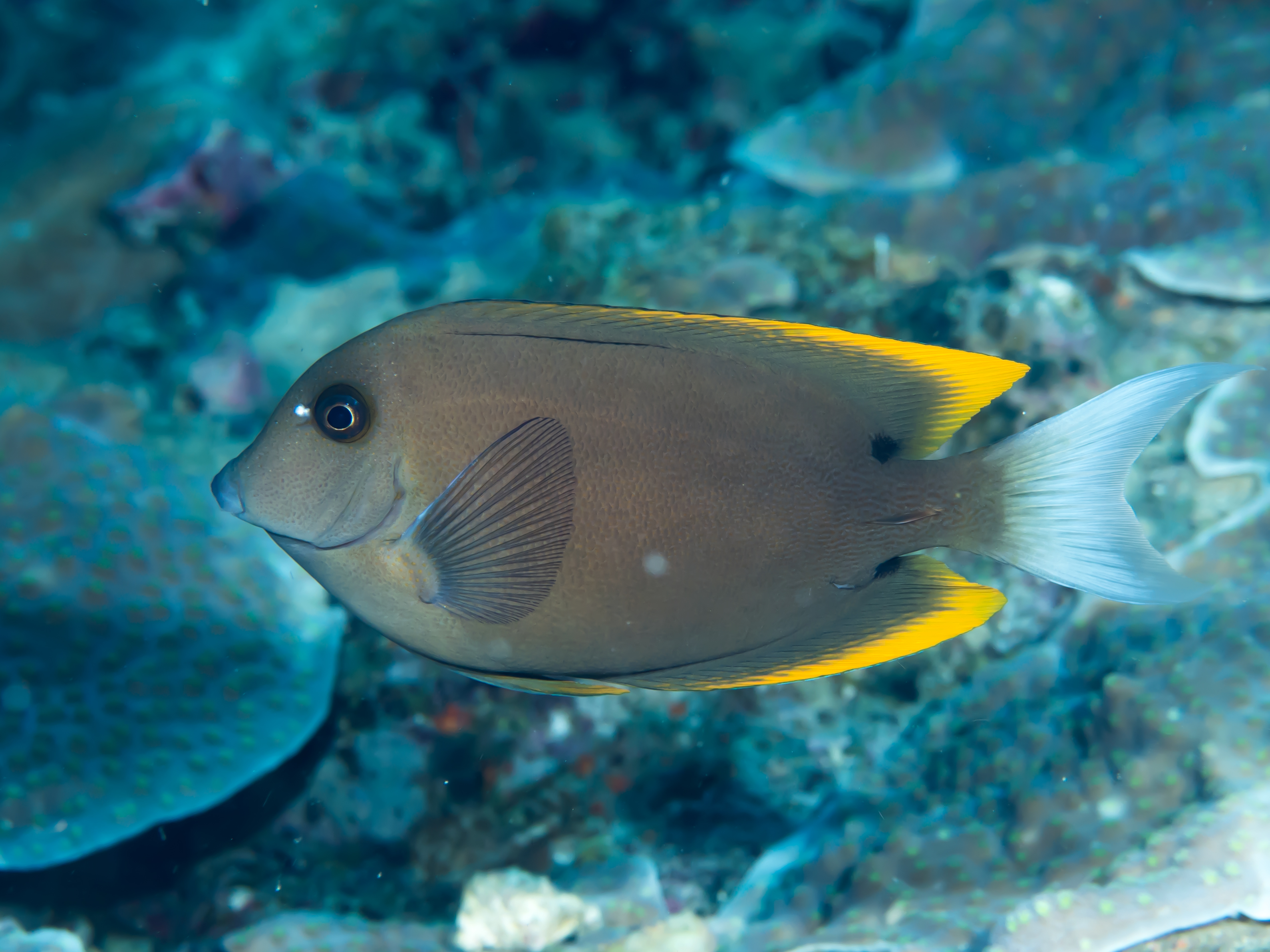

Conservation status
- Least Concern (IUCN 3.1)

Scientific classification
- Kingdom: Animalia
- Phylum: Chordata
- Class: Actinopterygii
- Order: Acanthuriformes
- Family: Acanthuridae
- Genus: Ctenochaetus
- Species: C. tominiensis

Binomial name
- Ctenochaetus tominiensis J. E. Randall, 1955

= Ctenochaetus tominiensis =

Species of fish

Ctenochaetus tominiensis, the Tomini surgeonfish, Tomini bristletooth, yellowtip bristletooth or orangetip bristletooth, is a species of marine ray-finned fish belonging to the family Acanthuridae which includes the surgeonfishes, unicornfishes and tangs. This fish is found in the western central Pacific Ocean.

== Taxonomy ==
Ctenochaetus tominiensis was first formally described in 1955 by the American ichthyologist John Ernest Randall with its type locality given as Sadaa Island in the Gulf of Tomini, Sulawesi, Indonesia. The genera Ctenochaetus and Acanthurus make up the tribe Acanthurini which is one of three tribes in the subfamily Acanthurinae which is one of two subfamilies in the family Acanthuridae.

== Description ==
Ctenochaetus tominiensis has its dorsal fin supported by 8 spines and 24 or 25 soft rays while the anal fin is supported by 3 spines and 22 or 23 soft rays. The rear ends of the dorsal and anal fins are, uniquely in the genus Ctenochaetus, angular. The lips have warty margins. In juveniles the caudal fin is forked and in adults it is lunate. The maximum published standard length of this fish is 16 cm (6.3 in). The overall colour of the body is yellowish brown with a white caudal fin and broad yellow margins to the dorsal and anal fins.

== Distribution and habitat ==
Ctenochaetus tominiensis is found in the western central Pacific Ocean from Malaysia and Indonesia east through East Timor, the Philippines, Palau, Micronesia, Papua New Guinea, the Solomon Islands, Tuvalu, Vanuatu and Fiji, south to the Great Barrier Reef. It has been recorded from Tonga. This species is found solitarily or in small aggregations on steep drop offs with dense coral growth in inshorse, sheltered waters at depths between 0 and 45 m (0 and 148 ft).
