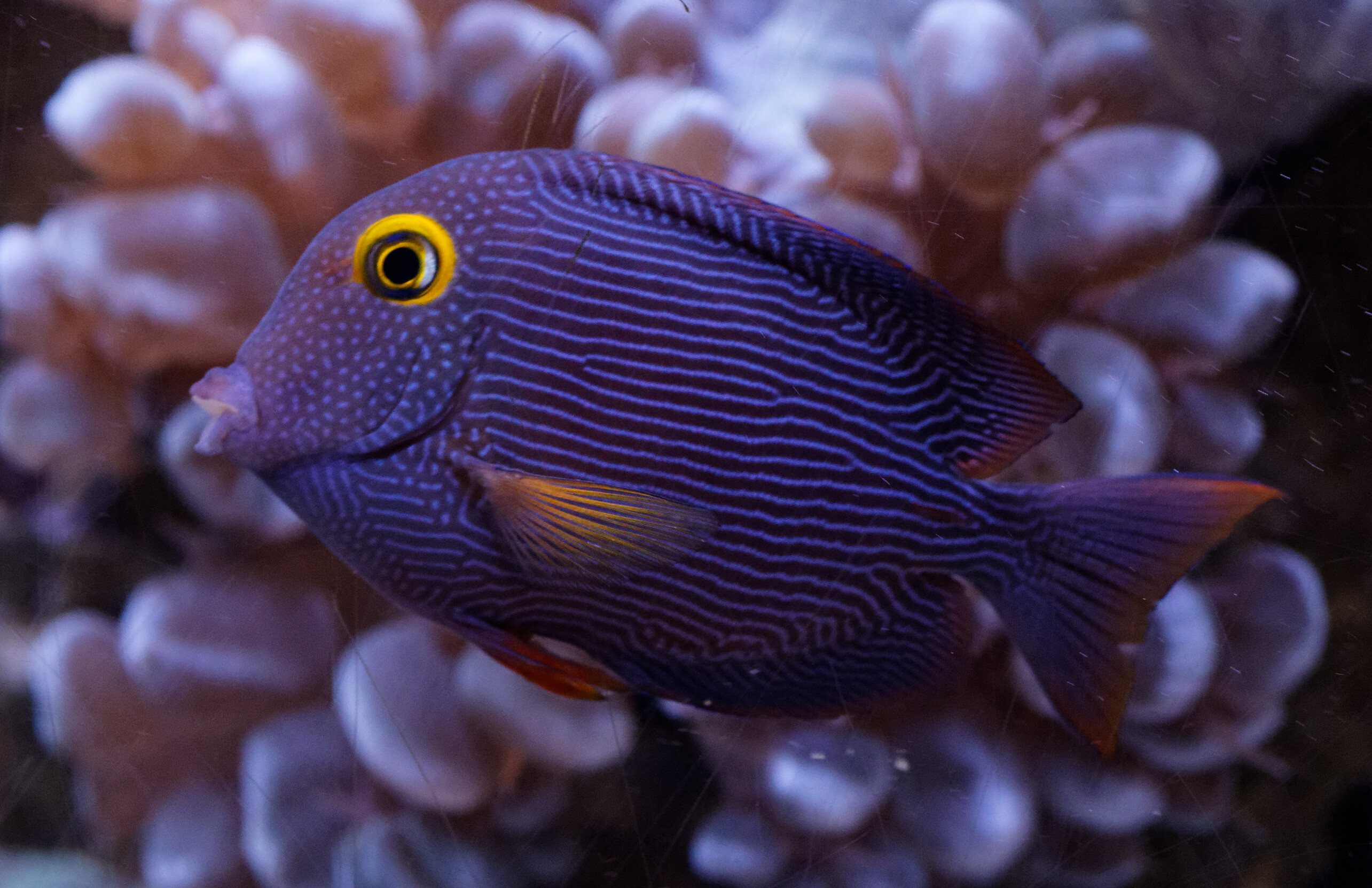

Conservation status
- Least Concern (IUCN 3.1)

Scientific classification
- Kingdom: Animalia
- Phylum: Chordata
- Class: Actinopterygii
- Order: Acanthuriformes
- Family: Acanthuridae
- Genus: Ctenochaetus
- Species: C. strigosus

Binomial name
- Ctenochaetus strigosus (E. T. Bennett, 1828)

Synonyms
- Acanthurus strigosus E. T. Bennet, 1828

= Ctenochaetus strigosus =

Species of fish

Ctenochaetus strigosus, the kole tang, spotted bristletooth, spotted surgeonfish, goldring bristletooth, goldring surgeonfish, yelloweye tang or yellow-eyed surgeonfish, is a species of marine ray-finned fish belonging to family Acanthuridae which includes the surgeonfishes, unicornfishes and tangs. This fish is endemic to Hawaii.

== Taxonomy ==
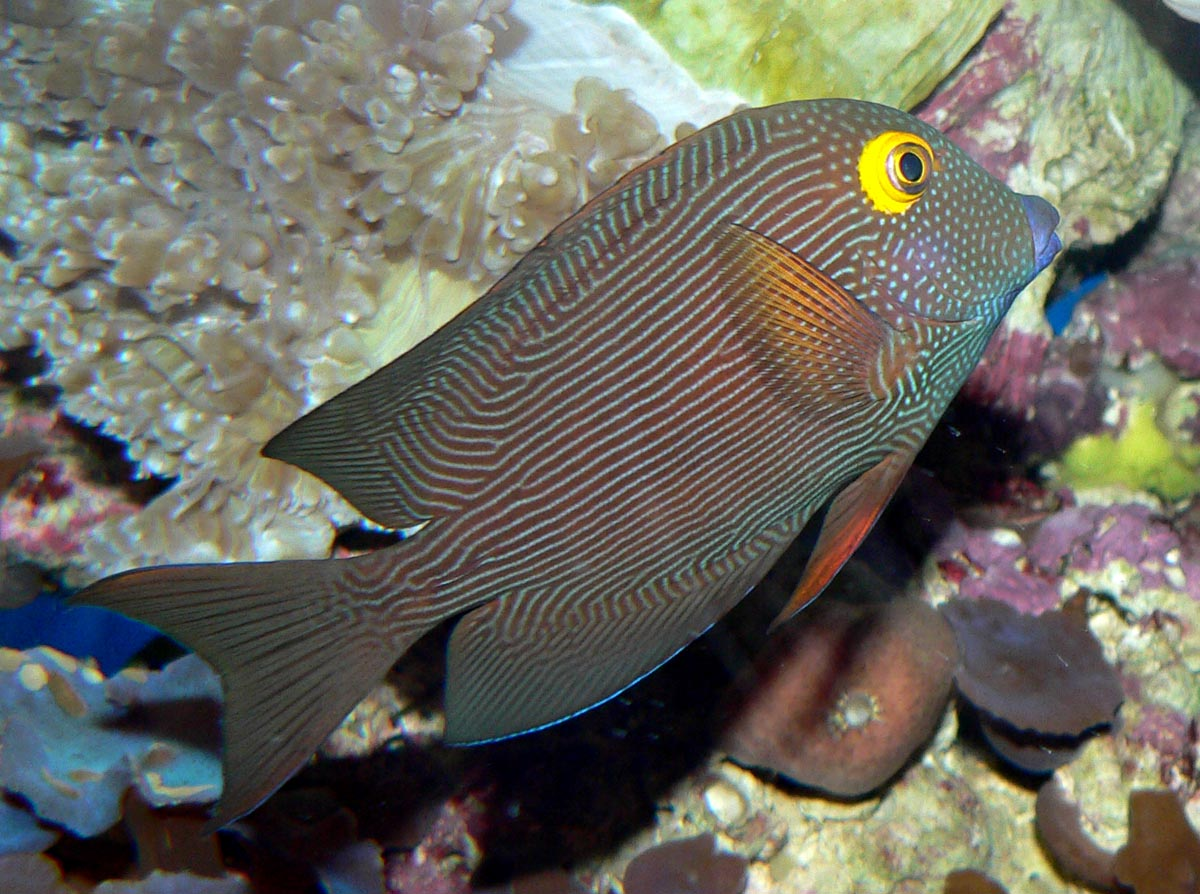
In an aquarium

Ctenochaetus strigosus was first formally described in 1828 as Acanthurus strigosus by the English zoologist Edward Turner Bennett with its type locality given as the Sandwich Islands. In 1884 Theodore Gill classified A. strigosus in the new monospecific genus Ctenochaetus, meaning that it is the type species of that genus by monotypy. The genera Ctenochaetus and Acanthurus make up the tribe Acanthurini which is one of three tribes in the subfamily Acanthurinae which is one of two subfamilies in the family Acanthuridae.

== Etymology ==
Ctenochaetus strigosus has the specific name strigosus, meaning "slender", probably an allusion to the many thin bristle-like teeth of this fish.

== Description ==
Ctenochaetus strigosus has its dorsal fin supported by 8 spines and between 25 and 28 soft rays while its anal fin is supported by 3 spines and 22 to 25 soft rays. The body is laterally compressed and it has a small mouth. The overall color is purplish to brown with slender, longitudinal light blue lines and a yellow ring around the eyes. This species has a maximum published standard length of 15 cm (5.9 in).

== Distribution and habitat ==
Ctenochaetus strigosus is endemic to the Hawaiian Islands and to Johnston Atoll in the United States Minor Outlying Islands. It is a benthopelagic species found at depths between 1 and 113 m (3 ft 3 in and 370 ft 9 in) over coral, rock and rubble where it lives singly and feeds by sifting food, such as diatoms and algae, detritus in its bristle-like teeth.

== Utilization ==
Ctenochaetus strigosus is a popular fish in the aquarium trade, it is one of the most heavily collected species in that trade in Hawaii. It is also an important species in recreational fisheries.
