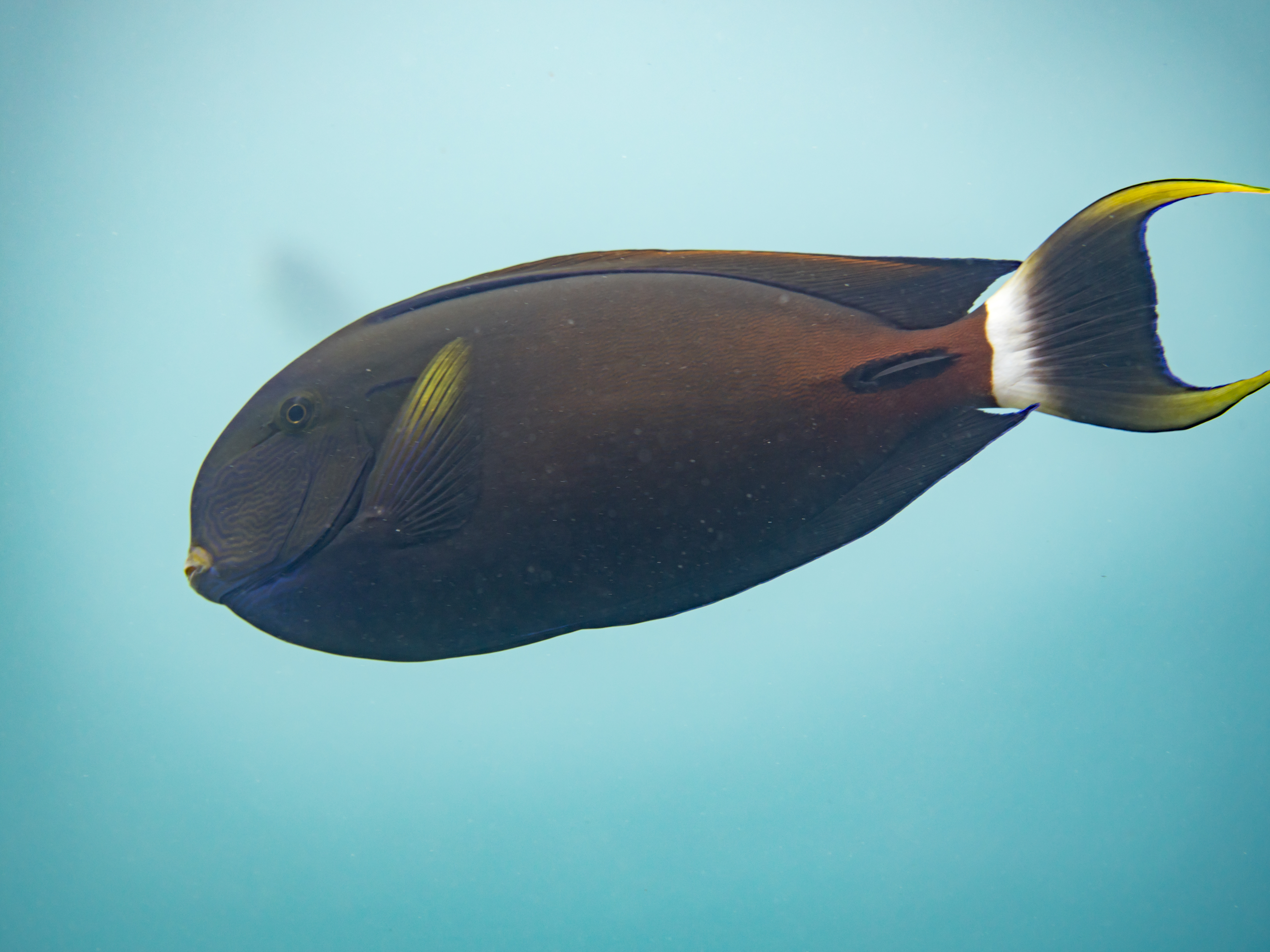

Conservation status
- Least Concern (IUCN 3.1)

Scientific classification
- Kingdom: Animalia
- Phylum: Chordata
- Class: Actinopterygii
- Order: Acanthuriformes
- Family: Acanthuridae
- Genus: Acanthurus
- Species: A. fowleri

Binomial name
- Acanthurus fowleri de Beaufort, 1951

= Acanthurus fowleri =

Species of fish

Acanthurus fowleri, Fowler's surgeonfish or the horseshoe surgeonfish, is a species of marine ray-finned fish belonging to the family Acanthuridae, the surgeonfishes, unicornfishes or tangs. This fish is found in the Western Pacific Ocean.

== Taxonomy ==
Acanthurus fowleri was first formally described in 1951 by the Dutch ichthyologist Lieven Ferdinand de Beaufort with its type localities given as Buika Island off Sulawesi in Indonesia, Maitara and Gomomo Islands in the Philippines. The genus Acanthurus is one of two genera in the tribe Acanthurini which is one of three tribes in the subfamily Acanthurinae which is one of two subfamilies in the family Acanthuridae.

== Etymology ==
Acanthurus fowleri has a specific name honouring the American biologist Henry Weed Fowler of the Philadelphia Academy of Sciences who originally reported this species but misidentified it as Hepatus pyroferus.

== Description ==
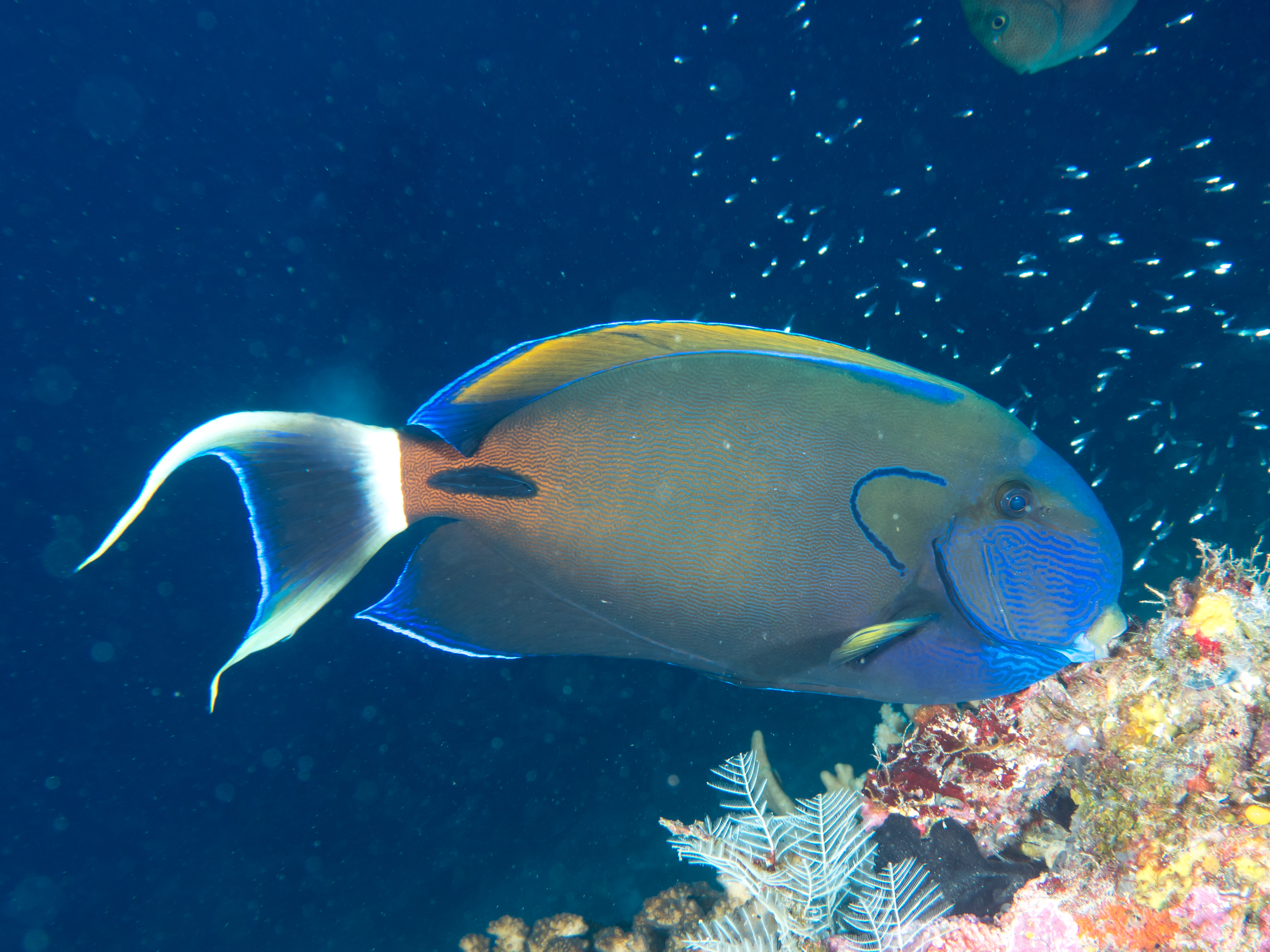
In Indonesia

Acanthurus fowleri has its dorsal fin supported by 9 spines and between 26 and 28 soft rays while the anal fin is supported by 3 spines and 25 to 26 soft rays. There is a large horseshoe-shaped blue or black mark on the flanks close to the head with its open end to the front and its upper part level with the eye over the upper end of the gill slit and the lower end over the base of the pectoral fins. The blue head is a diffused with purple. The caudal fin is blackish in the middle with each lobe having a yellow band merging with a white band at the base of the fin and the rear margin has a thin blue stripe.. The main colour on the body is bluish-grey. This species has a maximum published standard length of 45 cm (18 in).

== Distribution and habitat ==
Acanthurus fowleri is found in the tropical West Pacific. from the Philippines, Malaysia and Indonesia east to the Solomon Islands. In Australian waters it is found at the Scott Reef and the Ashmore Reef in the Timor Sea. They are found in water deeper then 20 m (66 ft) over outer reef slopes.
