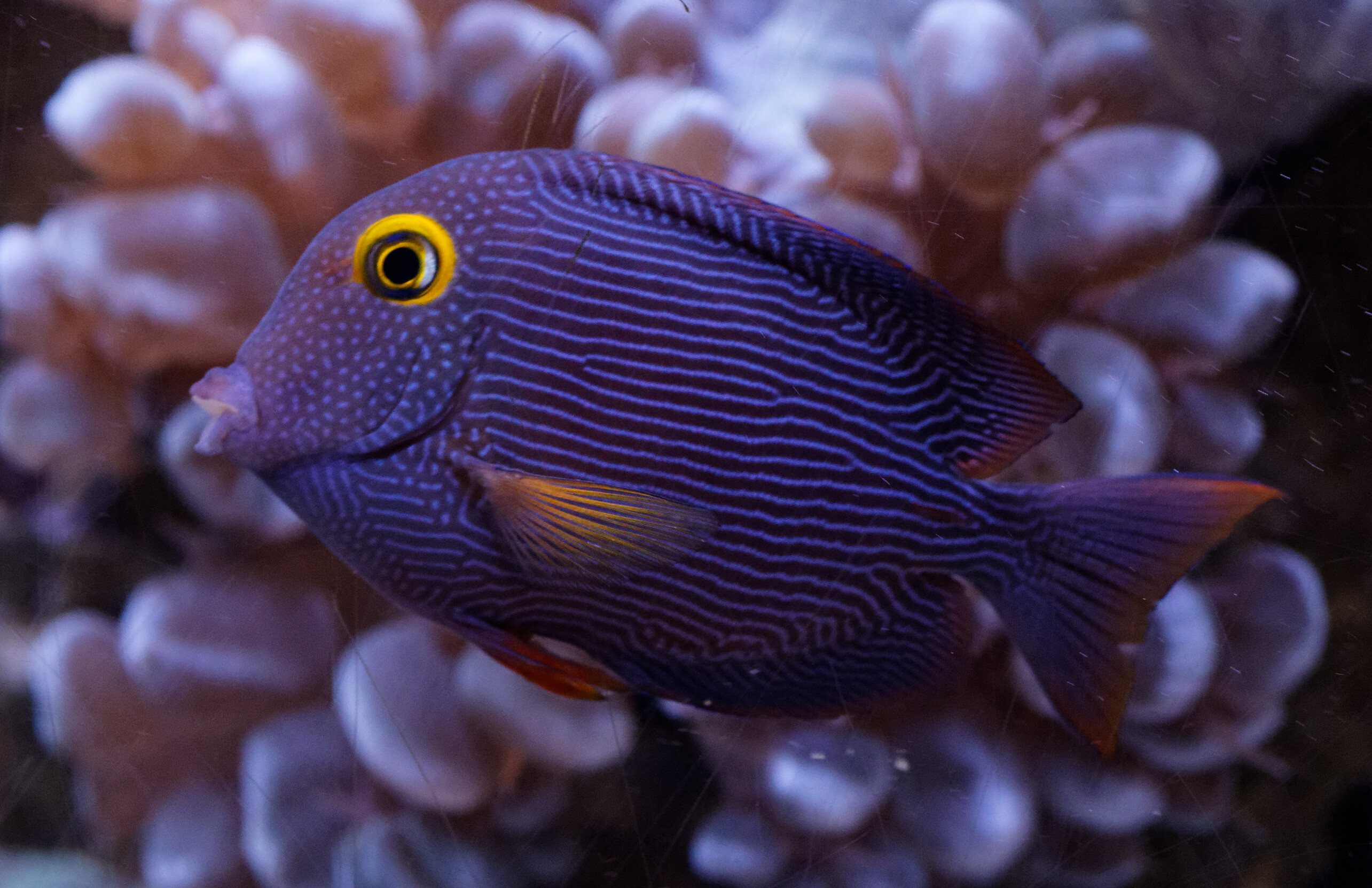
- Ctenochaetus strigosus

Scientific classification
- Kingdom: Animalia
- Phylum: Chordata
- Class: Actinopterygii
- Order: Acanthuriformes
- Family: Acanthuridae
- Tribe: Acanthurini
- Genus: Ctenochaetus; T. N. Gill, 1884

Type species
- Acanthurus strigosus E. T. Bennett 1828

Species
- See text

Synonyms
- Acronurus Günther, 1861; Ctenodon Klunzinger, 1871

= Ctenochaetus =

Genus of fishes

Ctenochaetus, or bristletooth tangs, is a genus of marine ray-finned fish belonging to the family Acanthuridae, which includes the surgeonfishes, unicornfishes and tangs. These fishes are found in the Indo-Pacific region. They have many, small flexible teeth and some species have the common name bristletooth.

== Taxonomy ==
Ctenochaetus was first proposed as a genus in 1884 by the American biologist Theodore Gill with Acanthurus strigosus as its type species. A. strigosus had originally been described in 1828 by Edward Turner Bennett from the Sandwich Islands.

=== Paraphyly ===
It has been proposed that this genus and Acanthurus should be merged as otherwise Acanthurus is paraphyletic. Ctenochaetus species all nest within Acanthurus, while A. nubilus and A. pyroferus are furthermore nested within Ctenochaetus. The 5th edition of Fishes of the World recognises these two genera as valid and classifies them as the two genera in the tribe Acanthurini of the subfamily Acanthurinae within the family Acanthuridae.

== Etymology ==
Ctenochaetus Is a compound of cteno, meaning “comb”, and chaetus, meaning “bristle”. Gill did not explain what this alluded to but it is almost certain to allude to the bristle or comb like teeth of these fishes.

== Species ==
Ctenochaetus currently has nine recognised species classified within it:

Species	Common name	Image
Ctenochaetus binotatus J. E. Randall, 1955	Twospot surgeonfish	
Ctenochaetus cyanocheilus J. E. Randall & Clements, 2001	Short-tail bristle-tooth	
Ctenochaetus flavicauda Fowler, 1938	Whitetail bristletooth	
Ctenochaetus hawaiiensis J. E. Randall, 1955	Chevron tang	
Ctenochaetus marginatus (Valenciennes, 1835)	Striped-fin surgeonfish	
Ctenochaetus striatus (Quoy & Gaimard, 1825)	Striated surgeonfish	
Ctenochaetus strigosus (E. T. Bennett, 1828)	Kole tang	
Ctenochaetus tominiensis J. E. Randall, 1955	Tomini surgeonfish	
Ctenochaetus truncatus J. E. Randall & Clements, 2001	Indian gold-ring bristle-tooth	

== Characteristics ==
Ctenochaetus surgeonfishes are closely related to the surgeonfishes in the genus Acanthurus and are very similar to them. They have a different jaw structure from the Acanthurus surgeonfishes having numerous brush or bristle like flexible teeth. Their dorsal fin is supported by 8 spines and between 24 and 31 soft rays while their anal fins are supported by 3 spines and between 22 and 28 soft rays. These fish vary in length from a maximum published standard length of 15 cm (5.9 in) in C. strigosus to a maximum published total length of 27 cm (11 in) in C. marginatus.

== Distribution ==
Ctenochaetus surgeonfishes have a wide Indo-Pacific distribution. They are found from the eastern coast of Africa, including the Red Sea eastwards through the tropical Indian Ocean into the Pacific Ocean as far east as Hawaii.
