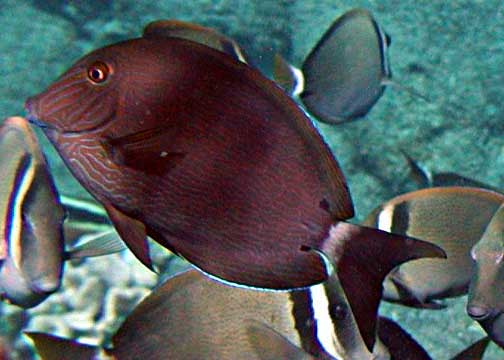

Conservation status
- Least Concern (IUCN 3.1)

Scientific classification
- Kingdom: Animalia
- Phylum: Chordata
- Class: Actinopterygii
- Order: Acanthuriformes
- Family: Acanthuridae
- Genus: Acanthurus
- Species: A. nigroris

Binomial name
- Acanthurus nigroris Valenciennes, 1835

Synonyms
- Acanthurus nigroris Valenciennes, 1835; Acanthurus bipunctatus Günther, 1861; Teuthis atrimentatus Jordan & Evermann, 1903; Hepatus atramentatus Jordan & Evermann, 1905; Acanthurus atramentatus (Jordan & Evermann, 1905)

= Acanthurus nigroris =

Species of fish

Acanthurus nigroris, the bluelined surgeonfish, is a species of marine ray-finned fish belonging to the family Acanthuridae, which includes the surgeonfishes, unicornfishes and tangs. This species and A. nigros have been regarded as synonymous with the combined taxon having a wide Indo-Pacific distribution, if treated as a separate valid species it is confined to the United States Pacific islands.

== Taxonomy ==
Acanthurus nigroris was first formally described in 1835 by the French zoologist Achille Valenciennes with its type locality given as "Hawaiian island". In 1861 the German-born British zoologist Albert Günther described a new species Acanthurus nigros from the New Hebrides and in 1956 John E. Randall reviewed the genus Acanthurus and placed Günther's A. nigros in synonymy with A. nigroris but in 2011 workers, including Randall, have argued that genetic differences support the validity of A. nigros as a separate species from A. nigroris. The genus Acanthurus is one of two genera in the tribe Acanthurini which is one of three tribes in the subfamily Acanthurinae which is one of two subfamilies in the family Acanthuridae.

== Etymology ==
Acanthurus nigroris has the subspecific name, nigroris combining niger, meaning "black", with oris, meaning "mouth" a reference to the black lips Valenciennes described for this fish, these are not apparent in living specimens so may be a result of preservation in alcohol.

== Description ==
Acanthurus nigroris has its dorsal fin supported by 9 spines and between 23 and 26 soft rays while its anal fin is supported by 3 spines and 22-24 soft rays. It also has a anterior gill raker count of between 26 and 31. The overall colour of the body is pale to dark brown, with slightly irregular, horizontal, dotted blue lines thinner than the brown spaces between them. There are blue lines on the head below the eye and on the gill cover which run parallel to the snout. There is a black spot with a diameter less than half that of the eye at the posterior of both the dorsal and anal fins. There is frequently a thick whitish bar on the caudal peduncle. The dorsal and anal fins have horizontal reddish brown bands and a slender blue margin. The caudal fin has a thin white rear margin. The maximum standard length is 18 cm (7.1 in).

== Distribution and habitat ==
Acanthurus nigroris sensu stricto is found in the central Pacific Ocean where it is known only from the Hawaiian Islands and Johnston Atoll. This species is a generalist, as far as habitat is concerned, being found in schools which vary from a few individuals to hundreds inlagoons, on seaward reefs and in areas of mixed sand, rock and coral rubble. Here they graze on filamentous algae and feed on plankton.
