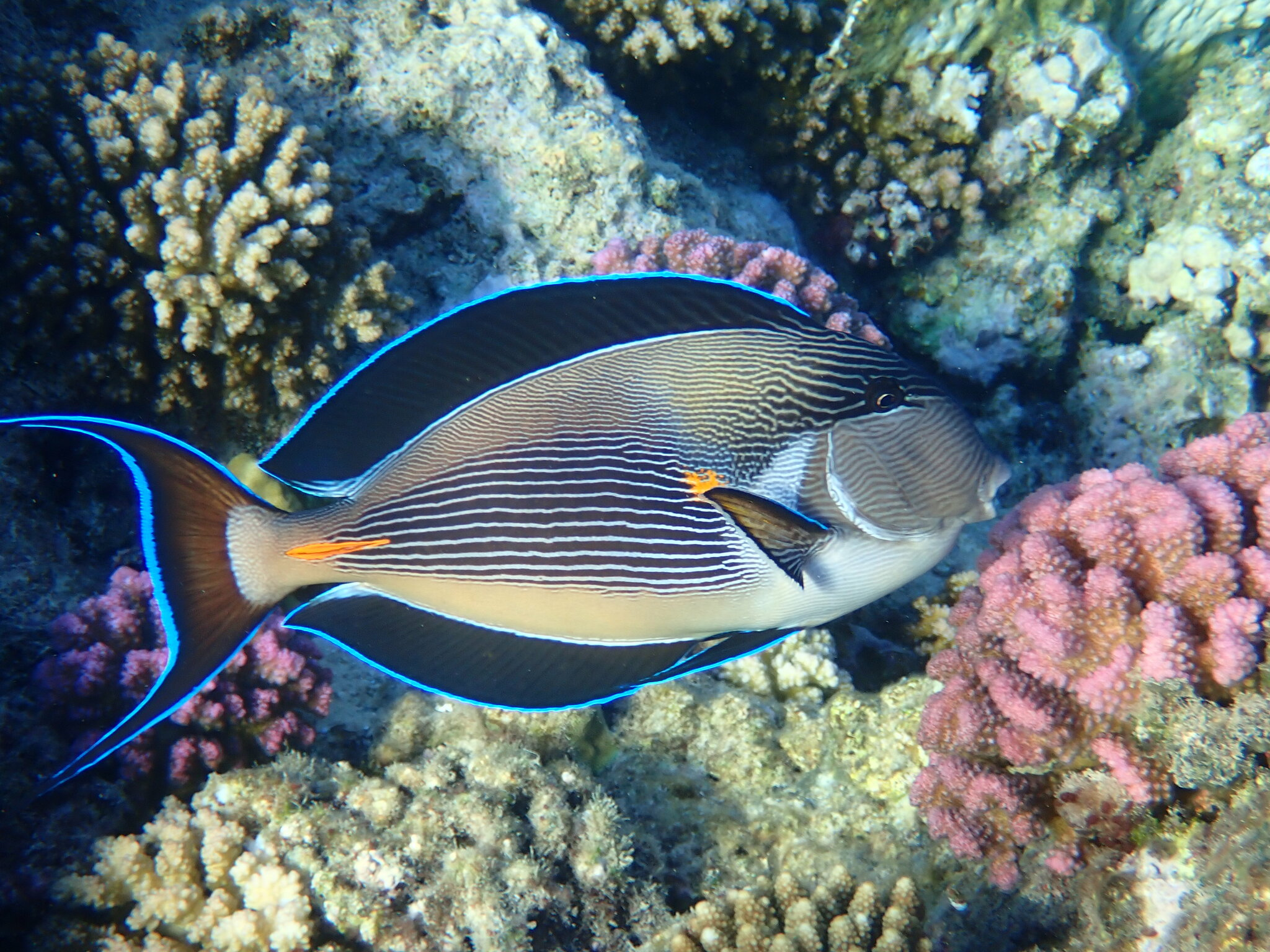
- Acanthurus sohal
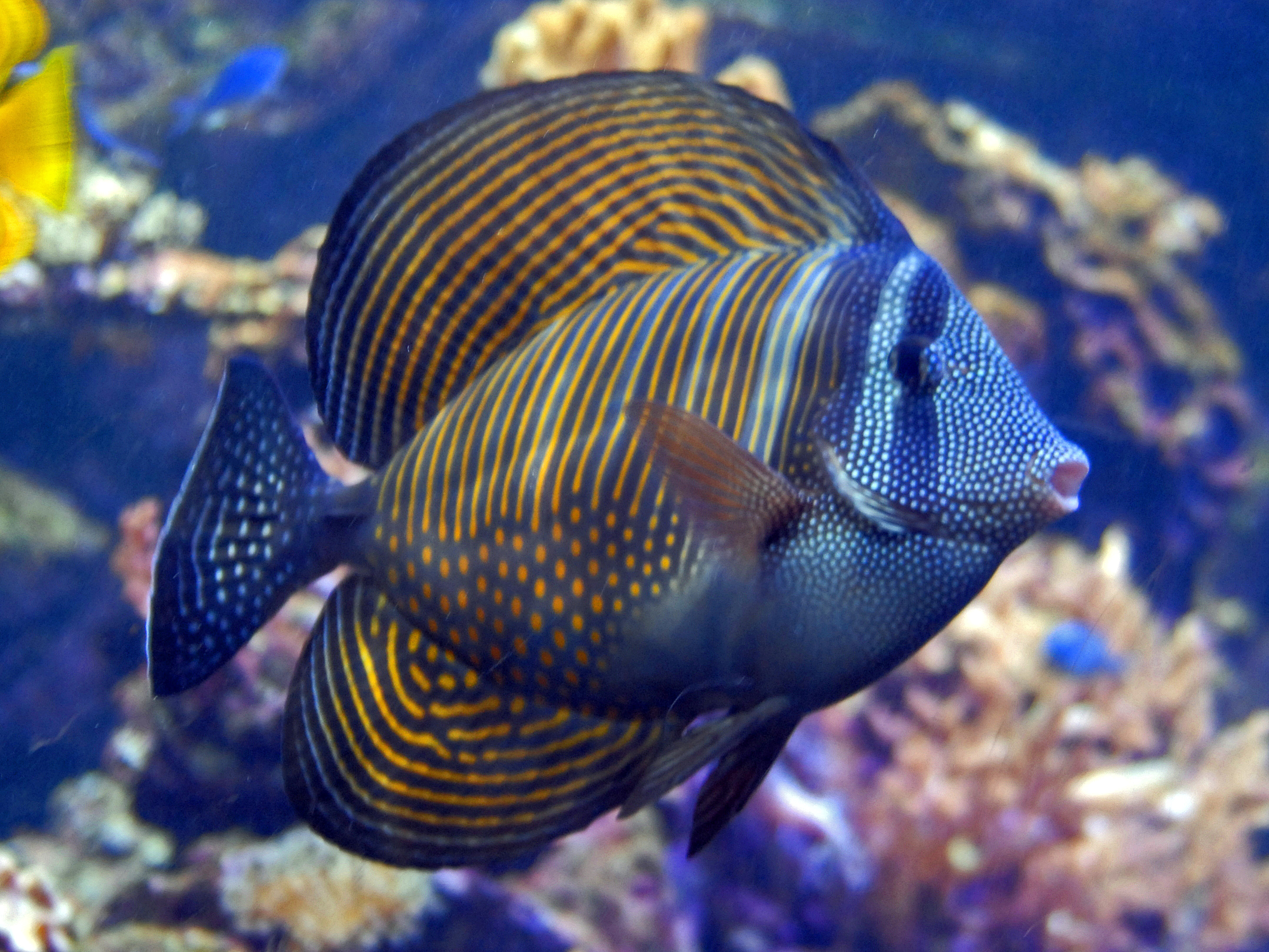
- Zebrasoma desjardinii

Scientific classification
- Kingdom: Animalia
- Phylum: Chordata
- Class: Actinopterygii
- Order: Acanthuriformes
- Family: Acanthuridae
- Subfamily: Acanthurinae; Bonaparte, 1835

Type species
- Acanthurus triostegus (Linnaeus, 1758)

Tribes and genera
- See text

= Acanthurinae =

Subfamily of fishes

Acanthurinae is a subfamily of marine ray-finned fishes belonging to the family Acanthuridae, found in the Indo-Pacific and the tropical Atlantic. These fishes commonly have the English names surgeonfishes or tangs.

== Taxonomy ==
Acanthurinae is the nominate subfamily of the family Acanthuridae which was proposed by the French zoologist Charles Lucien Bonaparte in 1835. The 5th edition of Fishes of the World recognises 3 tribes within the subfamily, the Acanthurini, Prionurini and Zebrasomoni. The other subfamily in the Acanthuridae is the monogeneric Nasinae.

== Tribes and genera ==
Acanthurinae is subdivided into the following tribes and genera:

Tribe	Genus	Species	Image
Acanthurini Bonaparte, 1835	Acanthurus Forsskål 1775	41	A. lineatus
Acanthurini Bonaparte, 1835	Ctenochaetus Gill, 1884	9	C. tominiensis
Prionurini J. L. B. Smith, 1966	Prionurus Lacépède, 1804	7	P. laticlavius
Zebrasomini Winterbottom, 1993	Paracanthurus Bleeker, 1863	1	P. hepatus
Zebrasomini Winterbottom, 1993	Zebrasoma Swainson, 1839	7	Z. flavescens

FishBase list 57 species in the subfamily, with Acanthurus containing 40 species being the most speciose genus.

== Characteristics ==
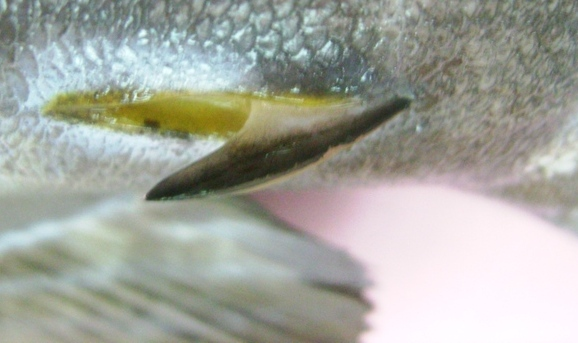
Acanthurus xanthopterus tail spine

Acanthurini surgeonfishes are characterised by having 3 spines in the anal fin. They also have one or more mobile and flexible spine on the caudal peduncle, this spine is not mobile in Prionurus, that may be extended as a defensive weapon. In the tribe Acanthurini this spine is held in a deep slit. They have 5 branchiostegals and they have spatulate teeth in the jaws. The smallest species is the bluebarred surgeonfish (Acanthurus polyzona) with a maximum published total length of 11 cm (4.3 in) while the largest species, Fowler's surgeonfish (A. folweri) and the powderblue surgeonfish (A. leucosternon), both have maximum published total lengths of 54 cm (21 in).

== Distribution ==
Acanthurinae are mainly found in the Indo-Pacific region but five species in the genus Acanthurus extend into the tropical and subtropical Atlantic Ocean but they are absent from the Mediterranean.

== Bibliography ==
- Joseph S. Nelson: Fishes of the World. John Wiley & Sons, 2006, ISBN 0-471-25031-7
- André Luty: Doktorfische - Lebensweise - Pflege - Arten. Dähne Verlag, Ettlingen 1999, ISBN 3-921684-61-7
- Andreas Vilcinskas: Meerestiere der Tropen, Franckh-Kosmos Verlag, Stuttgart 2000, ISBN 3-440-07943-0
- Helmut Debelius und Rudie H. Kuiter: Doktorfische und ihre Verwandten. Ulmer Verlag Stuttgart 2002, ISBN 3-8001-3669-4
