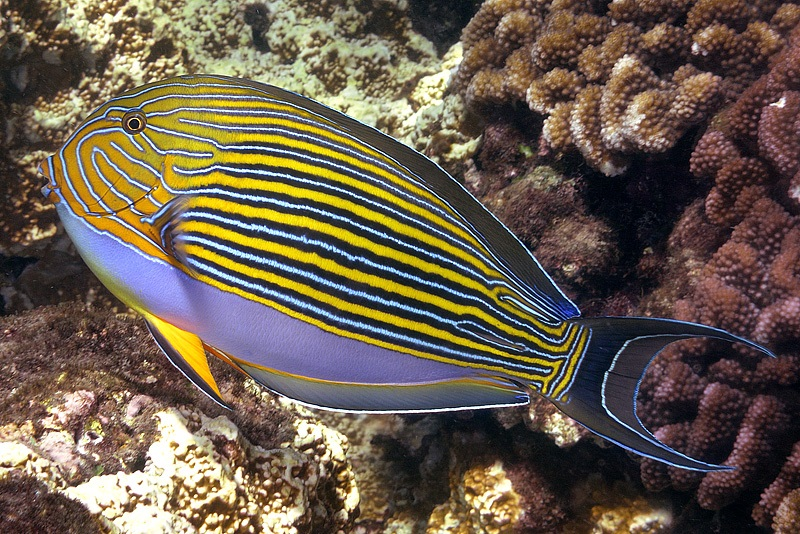
- Acanthurus lineatus
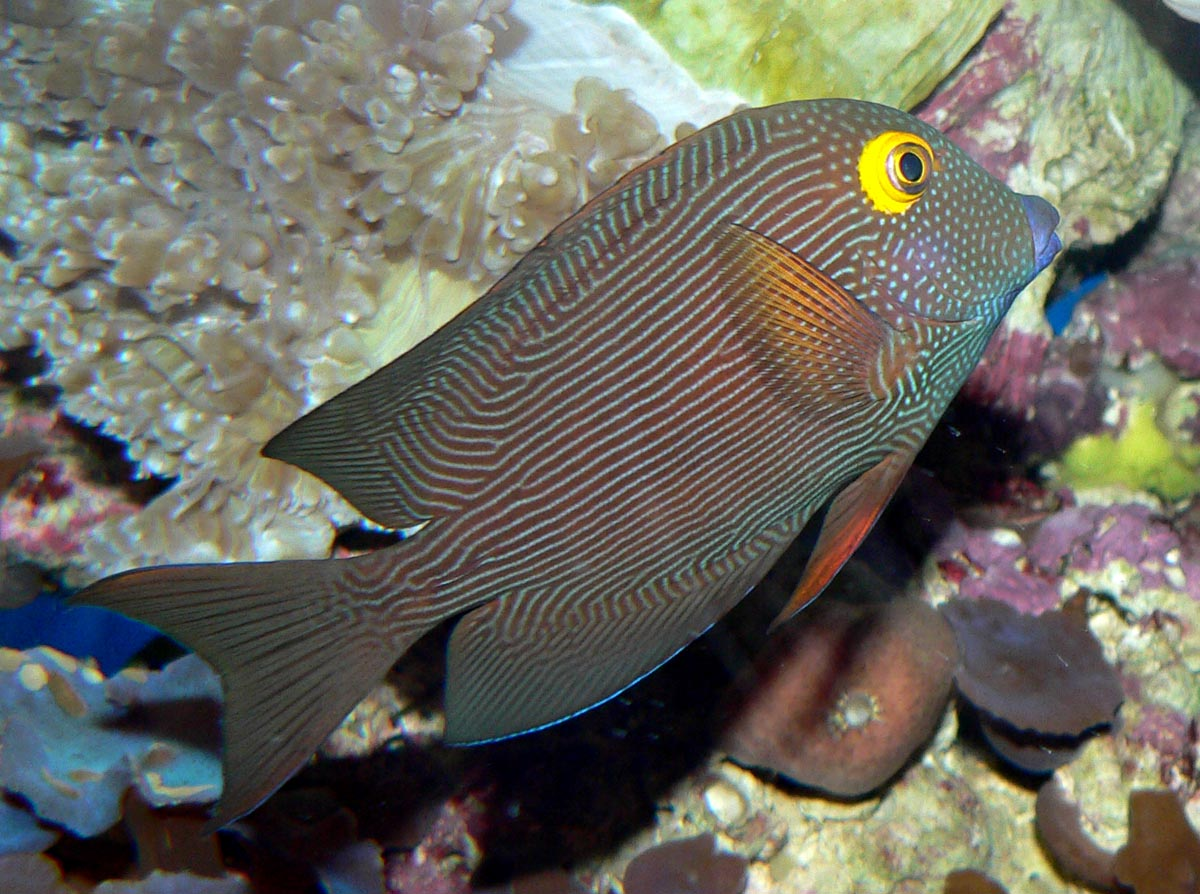
- Ctenochaetus strigosus

Scientific classification
- Kingdom: Animalia
- Phylum: Chordata
- Class: Actinopterygii
- Order: Acanthuriformes
- Family: Acanthuridae
- Subfamily: Acanthurinae
- Tribe: Acanthurini; Bonaparte, 1839

Type species
- Acanthurus triostegus (Linnaeus, 1758)

Genera
- see text

= Acanthurini =

Tribe of fishes

Acanthurini is a tribe of marine ray-finned fishes belonging to the family Acanthuridae and it is one of three tribes in the subfamily Acanthurinae.

== Etymology ==
The tribe name comes from Ancient Greek ἄκανθα (ákantha), meaning "spine", and οὐρά (ourá), meaning "tail", a reference to the scalpel-like bony plates on the type species' caudal peduncle.

== Taxonomy ==
Acanthurini was first proposed as a taxon in 1839 by the French naturalist Charles Lucien Bonaparte and in 1993 it was delineated by the American ichthyologist Richard Winterbottom as consisting of the two genera Acanthurus and Ctaenochaetus, alongside the monotypic tribe Prionurini and with the remaining two Acanthurine genera, Zebrasoma and Paracanthurus, being classified in the tribe Zebrasomini. These tribes make up the subfamily Acanthurinae which with the subfamily Nasinae make up the family Acanthuridae.

== Genera ==
There are two genera within the tribe Acanthurini:

- Acanthurus Forsskål 1775
- Ctenochaetus Gill, 1884
