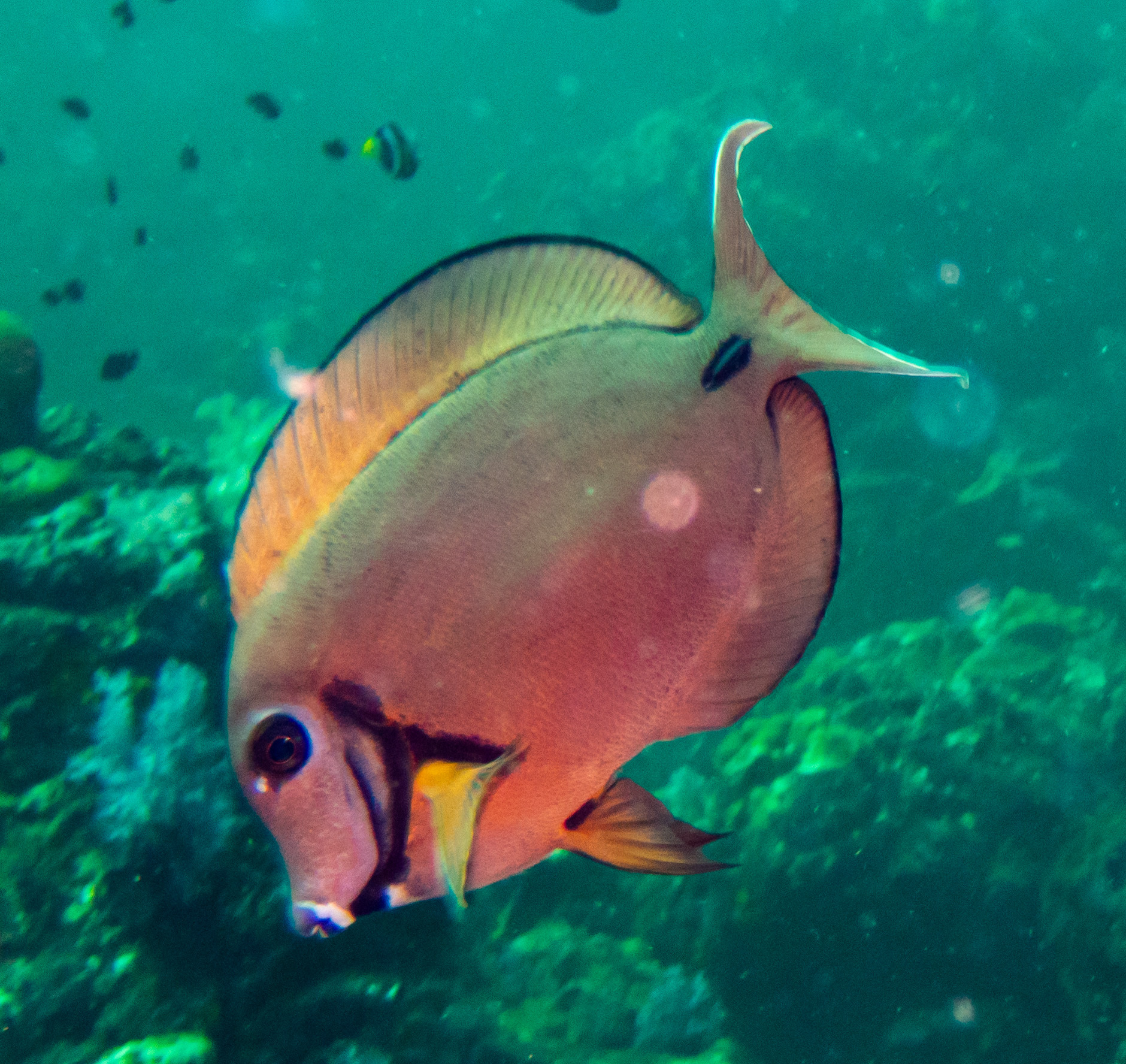
- Adult
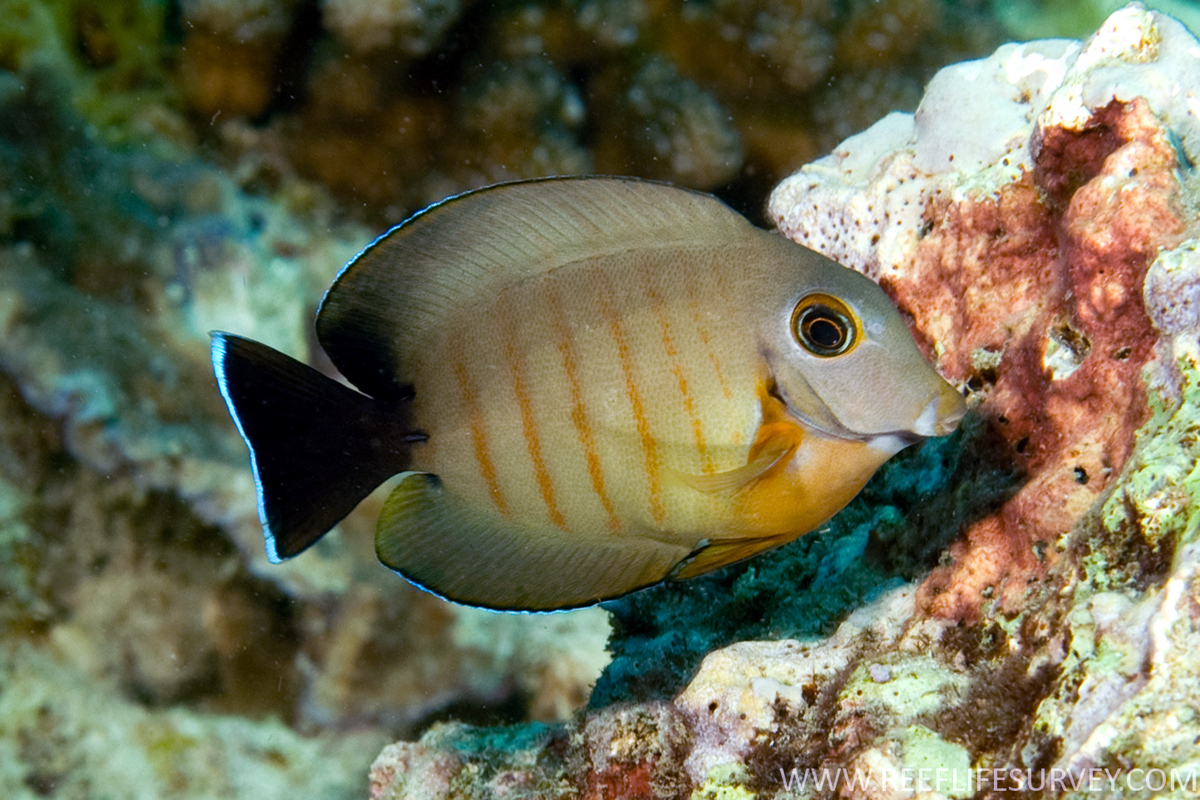
- Juvenile

Conservation status
- Least Concern (IUCN 3.1)

Scientific classification
- Kingdom: Animalia
- Phylum: Chordata
- Class: Actinopterygii
- Division: Teleostei
- Order: Acanthuriformes
- Family: Acanthuridae
- Genus: Acanthurus
- Species: A. tristis

Binomial name
- Acanthurus tristis J. E. Randall, 1993

= Acanthurus tristis =

Species of fish

Acanthurus tristis, the Indian Ocean mimic surgeonfish, blackcheek surgeonfish or yellowspot surgeonfish, is a species of marine ray-finned fish belonging to the family Acanthuridae which includes the surgeonfishes, unicornfishes and tangs. This species is found in the eastern Indian Ocean.

== Taxonomy ==
Acanthurus tristis was first formally described in 1993 by the American ichthyologist John Ernest Randall with its type locality given as Lively Rocks off Trincomalee on the east coast of Sri Lanka. The genus Acanthurus is one of two genera in the tribe Acanthurini which is one of three tribes in the subfamily Acanthurinae which is one of two subfamilies in the family Acanthuridae.

== Etymology ==
Acanthurus tristis has the specific name tristis, meaning "sad". This is thought to be a reference to the grey, subdued "mournful" colour of adults. The name was first used in an unpublished manuscript and painting by Samuel Tickell, subsequently being mentioned by Francis Day in 1888 who also described its ashy colour, although Day classified Tickell's name as a synonym of Acanthurus tennenti.

== Description ==
Acanthurus tristis has its dorsal fin supported by 8 rays and 27 or 28 (typically 27) soft rays while the anal fin is supported by 3 spines and between 22 and 29 soft rays. It has a deep compressed body which is half as deep as its standard length. It has a rather protruding snout and the dorsal profile of the head is convex. In adults the caudal fin is lunate. The adults have an overall colour of yellowish-brown to dark brown with a wide dark band running from the chin to the upper margin of the operculum. There is a white ring around the lower lip and a slender white rear margin to the caudal fin. The spine on the caudal peduncle has a patch of black enclosing it. The juveniles are Batesian mimics of Centropyge eibli and are pale brown coloured with orange stripes on the sides, with an orange chest, orange ring around the eye and orange margins to the dorsal and anal fins. The caudal fin also mimics that of C. eibli being black with a bright blue rear margin. The maximum published total length of this species is 25 cm (9.8 in).

== Distribution and habitat ==
Acanthurus tristis is found in the eastern Indian Ocean. It is found from the Maldives and Chagos Archipelago east to the Andaman Sea and south to Java. In Australian waters it is found at Christmas Island. This species occurs in seaward and lagoon reefs at depths between 2 and 30 m (6 ft 7 in and 98 ft 5 in) in areas of mixed sand, coral rubble and rock.

== Utilisation ==
Acanthurus tristis is part of the aquarium trade.
