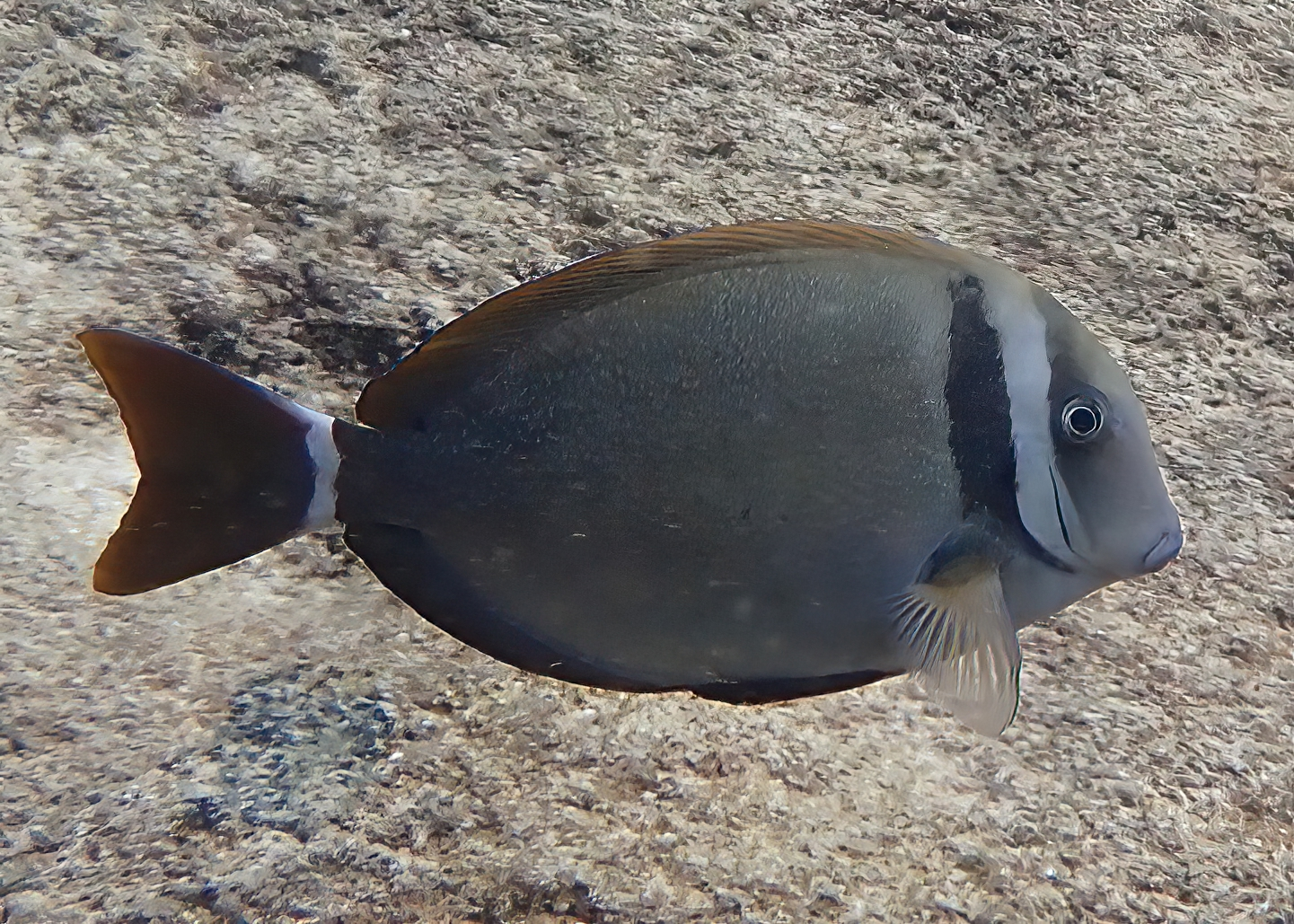

Conservation status
- Least Concern (IUCN 3.1)

Scientific classification
- Kingdom: Animalia
- Phylum: Chordata
- Class: Actinopterygii
- Order: Acanthuriformes
- Family: Acanthuridae
- Genus: Acanthurus
- Species: A. leucopareius

Binomial name
- Acanthurus leucopareius (O. P. Jenkins, 1903)

Synonyms
- List: Teuthis leucopareius Jenkins, 1903; Hepatus leucopareius (Jenkins, 1903); Teuthis bishopi Bryan & Herre, 1903; Teuthis umbra Jenkins, 1903; Hepatus umbra (Jenkins, 1903)

= Acanthurus leucopareius =

Species of fish

Acanthurus leucopareius, the whitebar surgeonfish or headband surgeonfish, is a species of marine ray-finned fish belonging to the family Acanthuridae, the surgeonfishes, unicornfishes and tangs. This species is found in the Pacific Ocean.

== Taxonomy ==
Acanthurus leucopareius was first formally described in 1903 as Teuthis leucopareius by the American physiologist, histologist and naturalist Oliver Peebles Jenkins with its type locality given as Honolulu on Oahu in Hawaii. The genus Acanthurus is one of two genera in the tribe Acanthurini which is one of three tribes in the subfamily Acanthurinae which is one of two subfamilies in the family Acanthuridae.

== Etymology ==
Acanthurus leucopareius has the specific name leucopareius, this combines the Greek words leukos, meaning "white", and pareius, meaning "cheek", this refers to the vertical pale band running over the operculum.

== Distribution and habitat ==
Acanthurus leucopareius has an anti-tropical distribution in the Pacific Ocean. In the Northern Pacific Ocean it occurs in the Marianas Islands, Marcus Island, southern Japan and Hawaii while in the Southern Pacific it is found at New Caledonia, Rapa Iti, Tuamotus, Pitcairn Islands and Easter Island. This species is found in the surge zone in areas of where there are boulders at depths between 1 and 75 m (3 ft 3 in and 246 ft 1 in) where it aggregates in small groups and grazes on filamentous algae.

== Description ==
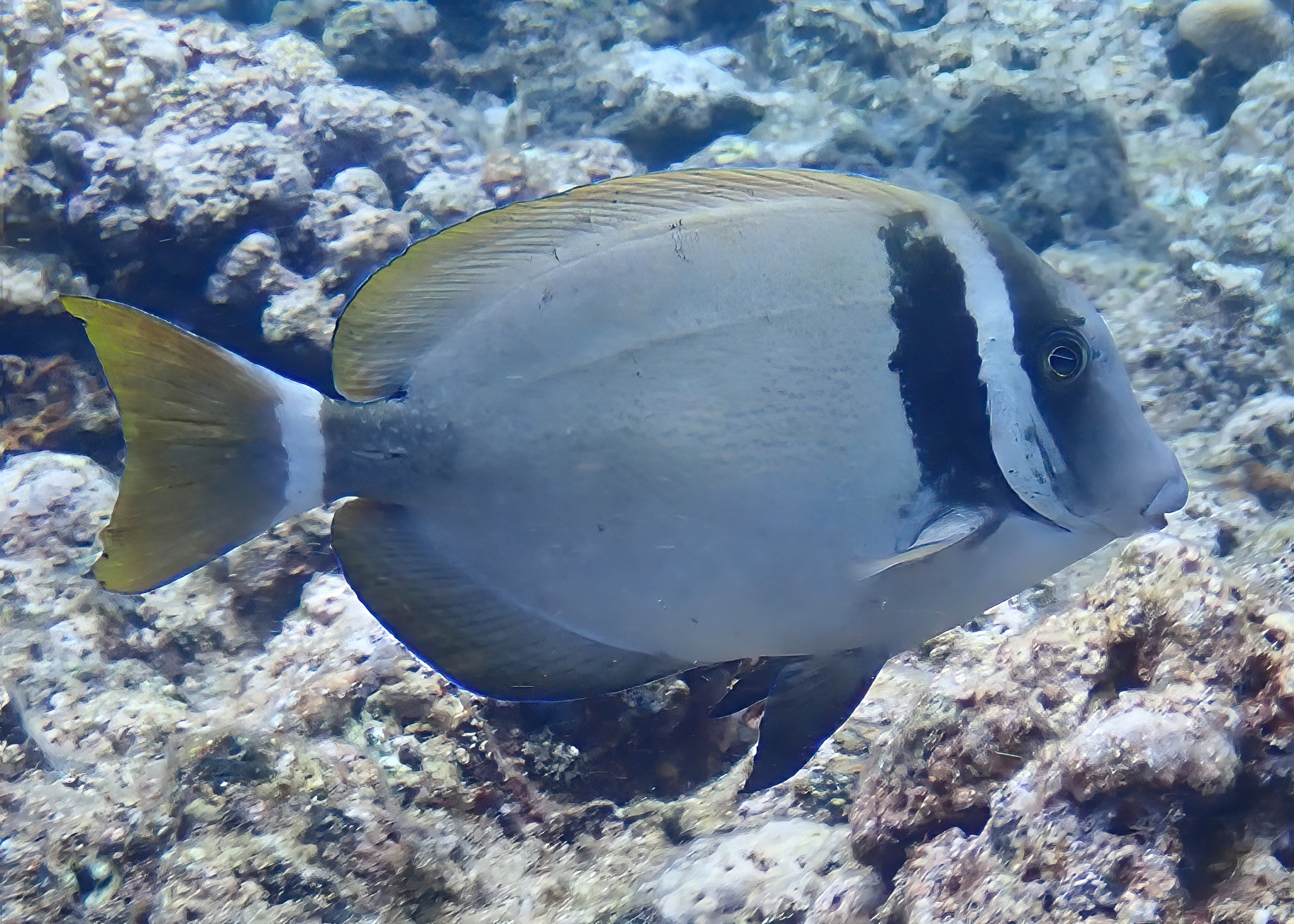
In Oahu

Acanthurus leucopareius has its dorsal fin supported by 9 spines and between 25 and 27 soft rays while the anal fin is supported by 3 spines and 23 to 25 soft rays. The body is not very deep and has a depth which fits into its standard length between 1.7 and 2.5 times. The caudal fin is emarginate to lunate and has no rear white margin. There is a whitish band, edged with dark brown running from the origin of the dorsal fin across the operculum. This species has a maximum total length of 25 cm (9.8 in).
