= Lunate =

Lunate means "crescent-shaped". It may refer to:

- Lunate (microlith), a crescent or moon-shaped microlith
- Lunate bone, a carpal bone in the human hand
- Lunate epsilon, fifth letter of the Greek alphabet, lowercase
- Lunate sigma, eighteenth letter of the Greek alphabet
