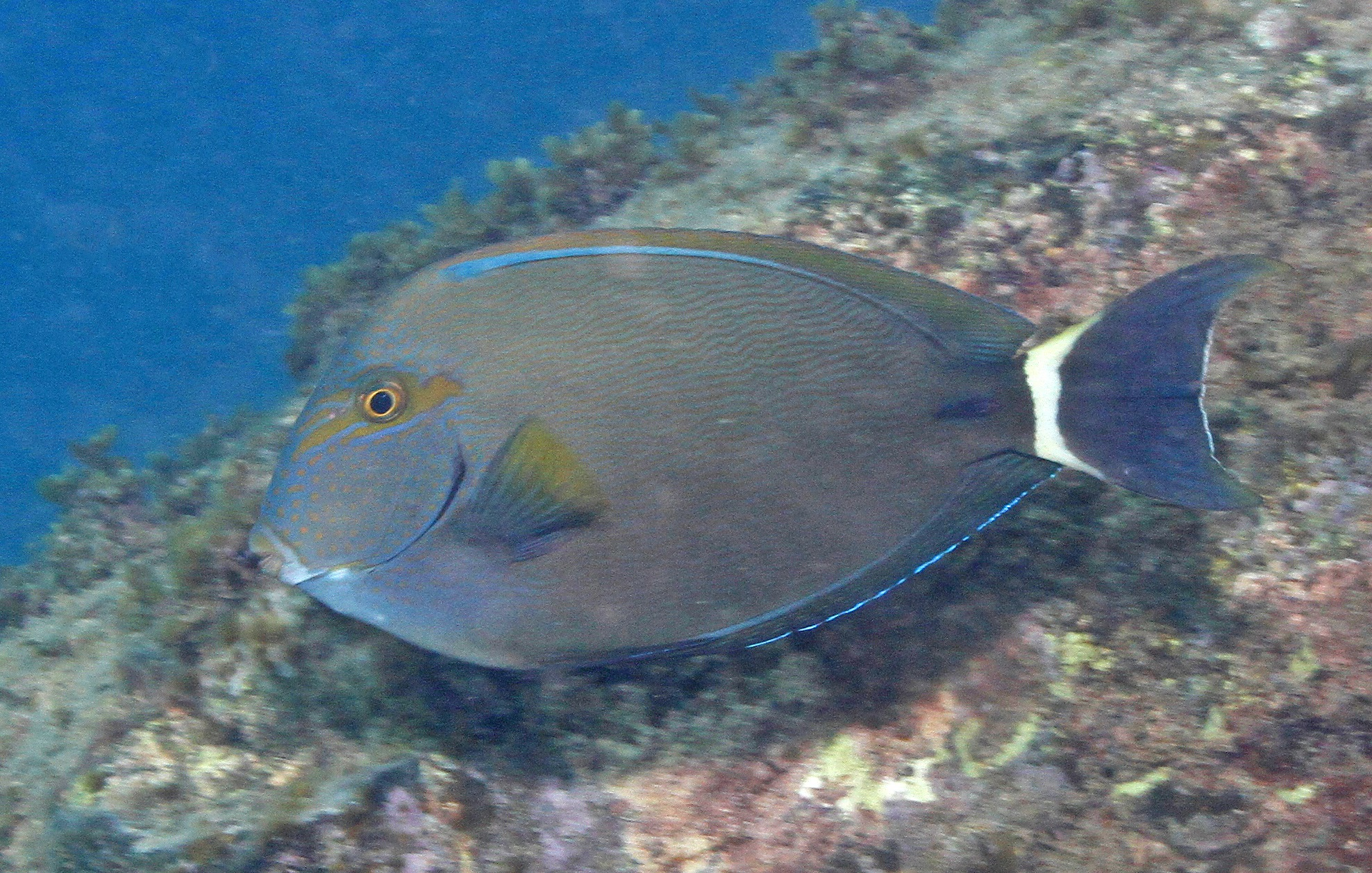

Conservation status
- Least Concern (IUCN 3.1)

Scientific classification
- Kingdom: Animalia
- Phylum: Chordata
- Class: Actinopterygii
- Order: Acanthuriformes
- Family: Acanthuridae
- Genus: Acanthurus
- Species: A. grammoptilus

Binomial name
- Acanthurus grammoptilus J. Richardson, 1843

= Acanthurus grammoptilus =

Species of fish

Acanthurus grammoptilus the finelined surgeonfish, inshore surgeonfish, Northwest surgeonfish or ring-tailed surgeonfish, is a marine ray-finned fish belonging to the family Acanthuridae, the surgeonfishes, unicornfishes and tangs. This fish is found in the Western Pacific Ocean.

== Taxonomy ==
Acanthurus grammoptilus was first formally described in 1843 by the Scottish naval surgeon, naturalist and Arctic explorer John Richardson with its type locality given as Port Essington in the Northern Territory of Australia. The genus Acanthurus is one of two genera in the tribe Acanthurini which is one of three tribes in the subfamily Acanthurinae which is one of two subfamilies in the family Acanthuridae.

== Description ==
Acanthurus grammoptilus has its dorsal fin supported by 9 spines and 25 or 26 soft rays while the anal fin is supported by 3 spines and 23 or 24 soft rays. It has a body which varies in depth, the depth fitting into the standard length between 1.9 and 2.5 times with juveniles and subadults having the deepest bodies. The caudal fin is lunate. The overall colour is typically brown to dark brown with a white band on the caudal peduncle. There is yellow streaking to the front and rear of the eye and small yellow spots on the cheeks. The caudal fin has a thin white rear margin. The dorsal fin has a thin blue margin and there are a series of very slender blue lines on the rear parts of both the dorsal and anal fin. The distal half of the pectoral fin is yellow and the spine on the caudal peduncle is dusky. This species has a maximum published fork length of 35.6 cm (14.0 in).

== Distribution and habitat ==
Acanthurus grammoptilus is found in the Western Pacific Ocean from Albrolhos in Western Australia east to Fiji, it has definitely been recorded only from Australia, Fiji and New Caledonia. It is found in a variety of habitats from silty coastal reefs to outer reef slopes with clear water.
