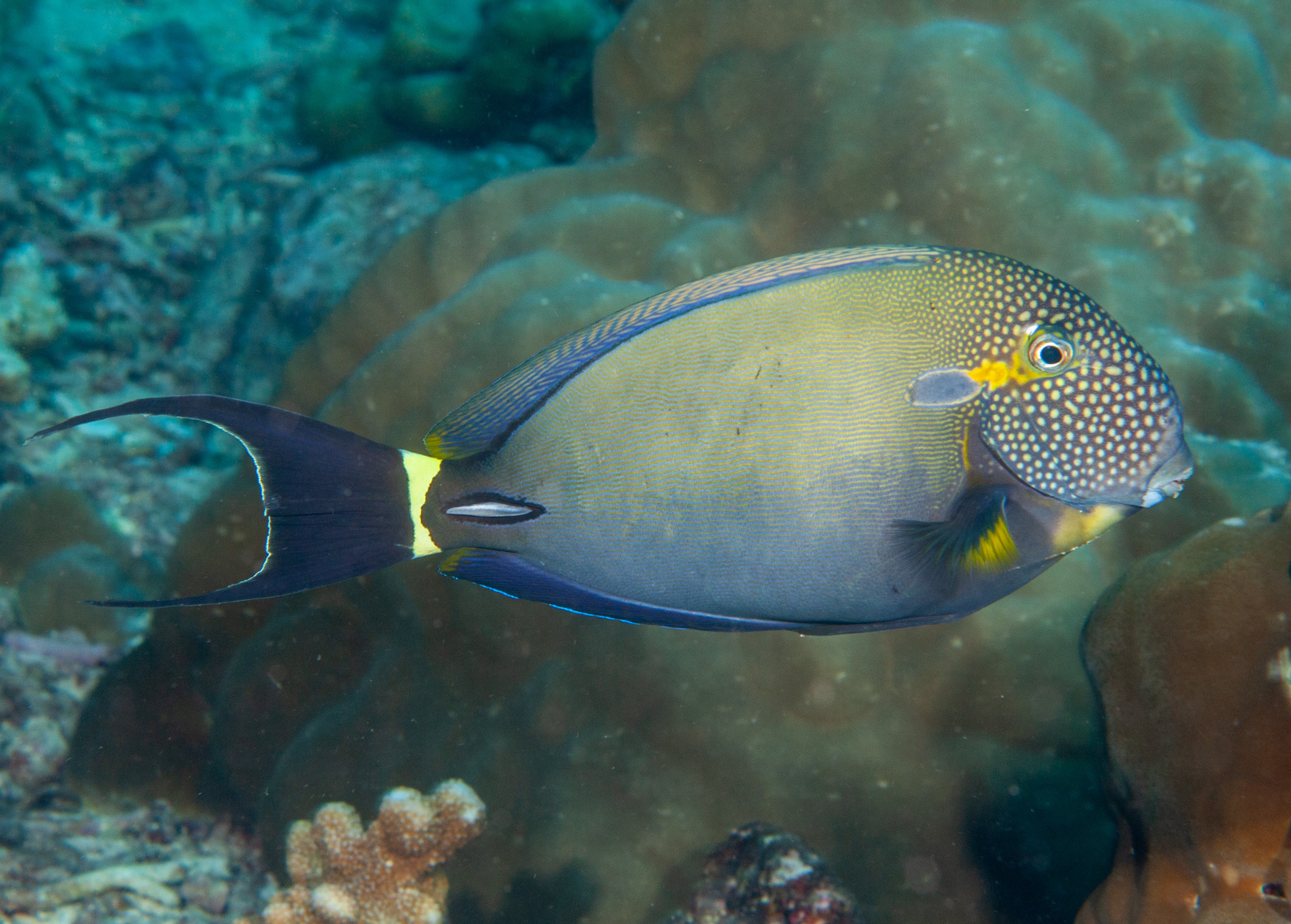

Conservation status
- Least Concern (IUCN 3.1)

Scientific classification
- Kingdom: Animalia
- Phylum: Chordata
- Class: Actinopterygii
- Order: Acanthuriformes
- Family: Acanthuridae
- Genus: Acanthurus
- Species: A. maculiceps

Binomial name
- Acanthurus maculiceps (Ahl, 1923)

Synonyms
- Hepatus maculiceps Ahl, 1923

= Acanthurus maculiceps =

Species of fish

Acanthurus maculiceps, the white-freckled surgeonfish, yellow-freckled surgeonfish, pale-lined surgeonfish, spotted-faced surgeonfish or earbar surgeonfish, is a species of marine ray-finned fish in the family Acanthuridae, the surgeonfishes, unicornfishes and tangs. This species is found in the Indo-West Pacific region.

== Taxonomy ==
Acanthurus maculiceps was first formally described in 1923 by the German zoologist Ernst Ahl with its type locality given as Talasea, a village on the Island of New Britain, Papua New Guinea. The genus Acanthurus is one of two genera in the tribe Acanthurini, which is one of three tribes in the subfamily Acanthurinae, which in turn is one of two subfamilies in the family Acanthuridae.

== Etymology ==
The specific name maculiceps combines the Latin words maculatus (meaning "spotted") and ceps (meaning "head"), and refers to the large number of pale spots on the head of this fish.

== Description ==
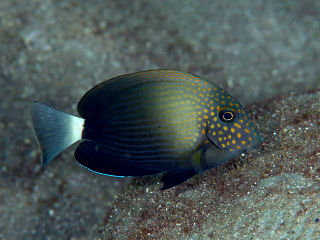
Juvenile

Acanthurus maculiceps has an oval, laterally compressed body with a convex dorsal profile to the head. The dorsal fin is supported by 9 spines and 24-26 soft rays, and the anal fin is supported by 3 spines and 22-24 soft rays. The pectoral fins have yellow tips, and the caudal fin is lunate with long filaments growing out of the fin lobes. The head is marked with pale spots and the body has fine lines along the flanks. There is a yellow patch underneath the mouth and an elongated dark blotch to the rear of the eye. The spine on the caudal peduncle is within a dark blotch and there is frequently a yellowish band on caudal peduncle. The overall color may vary from light yellow to dark brown, and the change in color can happen very quickly. This species has a maximum published standard length of 40 cm (16 in), and juveniles (which are white with a truncate caudal fin) gradually start developing adult coloration from a length of 20 cm (7.9 in).

== Distribution and habitat ==
Acanthurus maculiceps is found in the Indo-Pacific region. In the west, its range extends to Maldives, the Ryukyu Islands, the Line Islands and the Great Barrier Reef off Australia in the west, north, east and south respectively. It is found in clear waters in the outer reef flats and on seaward reefs at depths of 1–15 m (3.3–49.2 ft).

== Biology ==
Acanthurus maculiceps is found either solitarily or in small groups. It grazes on algae and detritus. The males develop brighter nuptial colors when spawning, and the eggs are pelagic.
