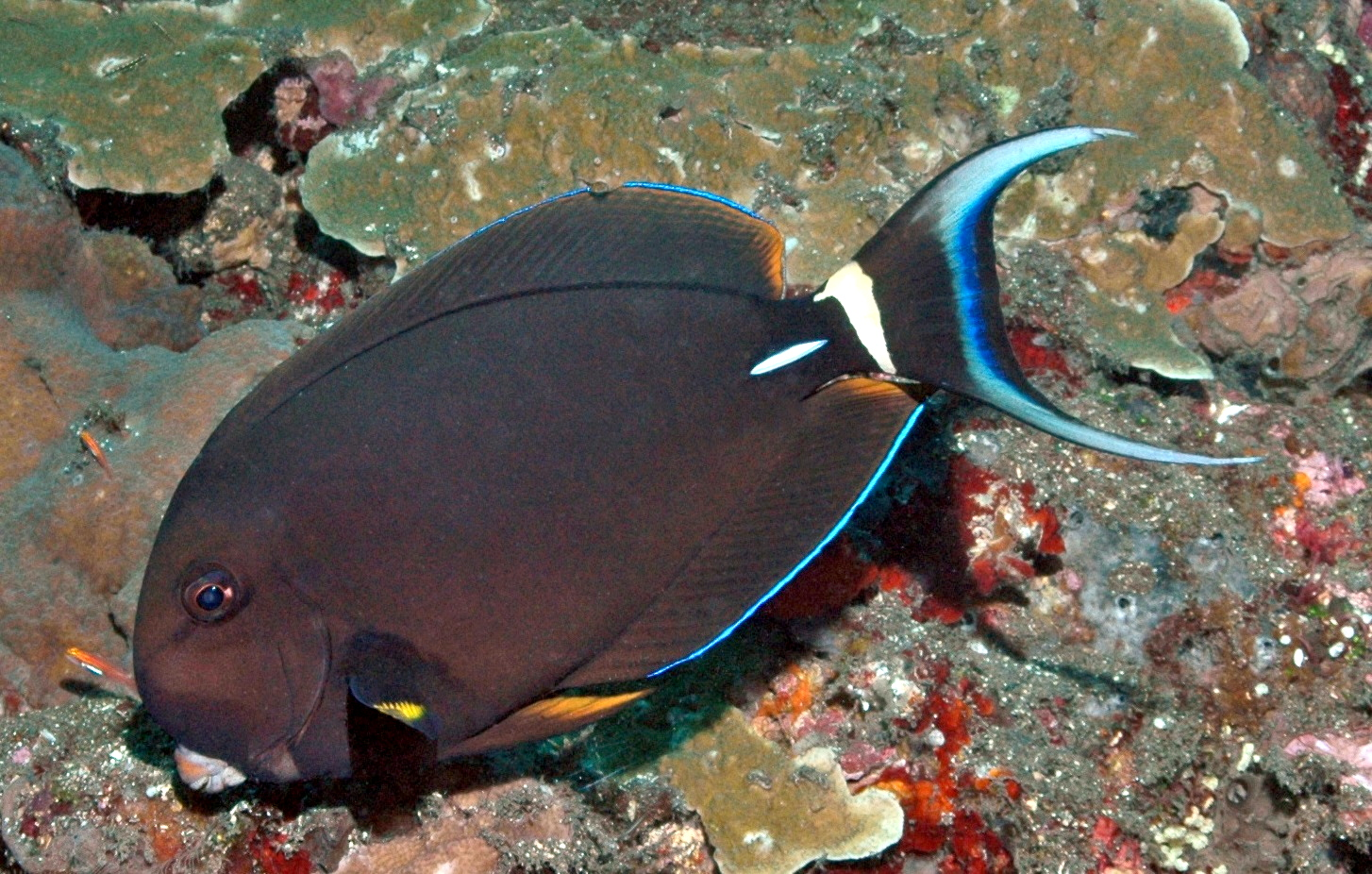

Conservation status
- Least Concern (IUCN 3.1)

Scientific classification
- Kingdom: Animalia
- Phylum: Chordata
- Class: Actinopterygii
- Order: Acanthuriformes
- Family: Acanthuridae
- Genus: Acanthurus
- Species: A. leucocheilus

Binomial name
- Acanthurus leucocheilus Herre, 1927

= Acanthurus leucocheilus =

Species of fish

Acanthurus leucocheilus, the palelipped surgeonfish or the white-spine surgeonfish is a species of marine ray-finned fish belonging to the family Acanthuridae, the surgeonfishes, unicornfishes or tangs. This fish is found in the Indo-Pacific region.

== Taxonomy ==
Acanthurus leucocheilus was first formally described in 1927 by the American ichthyologist Albert William Herre, with the type localities Bantayan, Cebu and Agutaya, in the Philippines. The genus Acanthurus is one of two genera in the tribe Acanthurini, which is one of three tribes in the subfamily Acanthurinae.

== Etymology ==
Acanthurus leucocheilus has the specific name leucocheilus, combining the Greek words leukos, meaning "white", and cheilos, meaning "lip", this refers to the red lips surrounded by a band of bright white colour with a black band posterior to it.

== Description ==
Acanthurus leucocheilus has its dorsal fin supported by 9 spines and 24 or 25 soft rays, while the anal finis supported by 3 spines and 23 soft rays. The overall colour of this fish is brown or blackish, with light coloured lips and a white band across the throat. The spine on the caudal peduncle is white and has a white bar around it. The pectoral fin has a white bar on its distal part. When feeding, the fish may be paler than at other times. Juveniles are brown and have a yellow tail. This species has a maximum published standard length of 45 cm (18 in).

== Distribution and habitat ==
Acanthurus leucocheilus is found in the Indo-Pacific. It occurs on the coast of eastern Africa between Djibouti and northern Mozambique, the Seychelles, Maldives, Sri Lanka, Andaman Islands, Nicobar Islands east to Tuvalu and the Line Islands, including Christmas Island in Australia. This species grazes on sand and detritus in small groups of up to 30 individuals at depths between 5 and 30 m (16 and 98 ft) in outer reefs.
