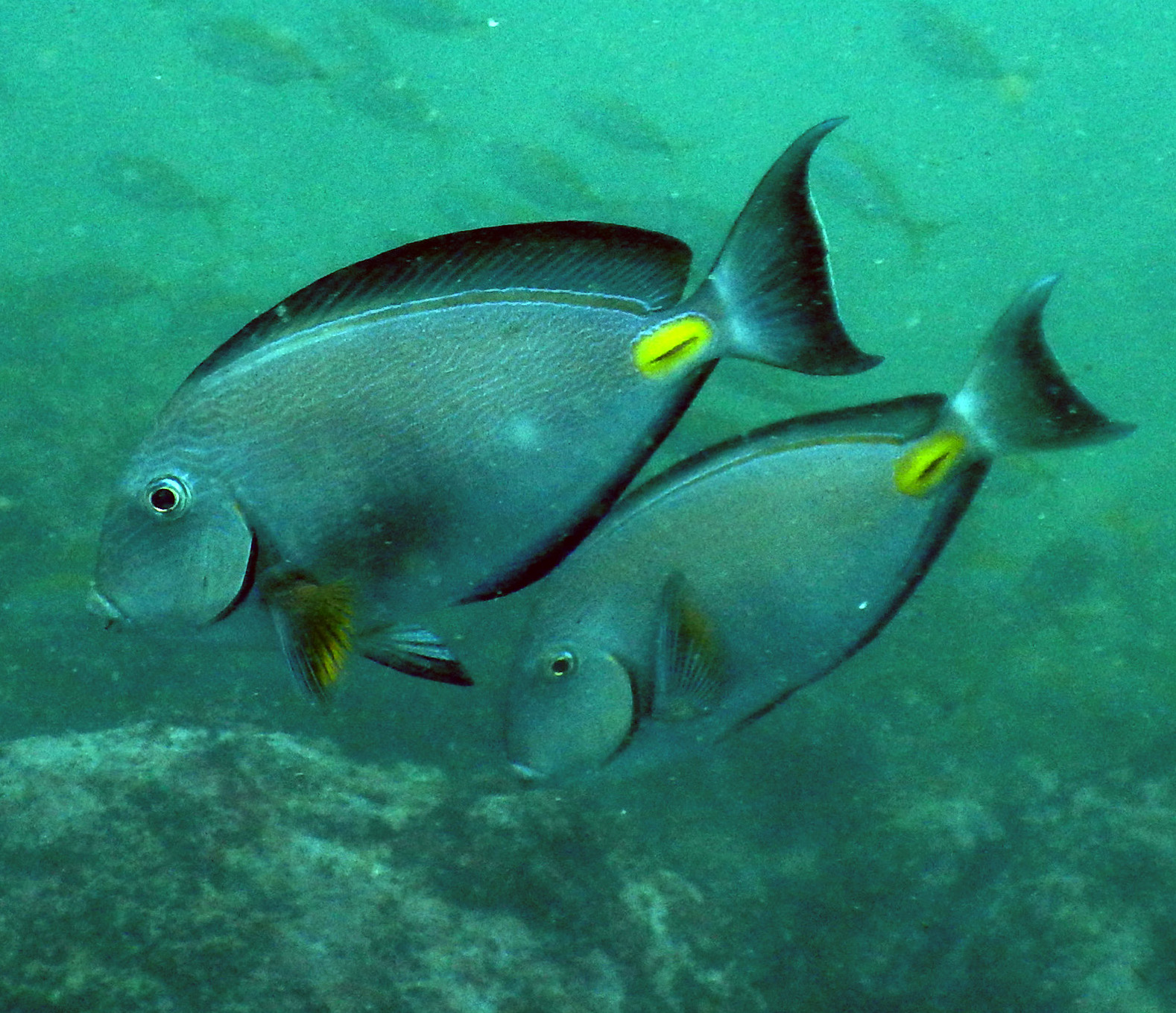

Conservation status
- Least Concern (IUCN 3.1)

Scientific classification
- Kingdom: Animalia
- Phylum: Chordata
- Class: Actinopterygii
- Order: Acanthuriformes
- Family: Acanthuridae
- Genus: Acanthurus
- Species: A. monroviae

Binomial name
- Acanthurus monroviae Steindachner, 1876

= Acanthurus monroviae =

Species of fish

Acanthurus monroviae, the Monrovia doctorfish, is a species of marine ray-finned fish belonging to the family Acanthuridae, the surgeonfishes, unicornfishes and tangs. It is found in the eastern Atlantic Ocean.

== Taxonomy ==
Acanthurus monroviae was first formally described in 1876 by the Austrian ichthyologist Franz Steindachner with its type locality given as Monrovia, Liberia. The genus Acanthurus is one of two genera in the tribe Acanthurini which is one of three tribes in the subfamily Acanthurinae which is one of two subfamilies in the family Acanthuridae.

== Description ==
Acanthurus monroviae has its dorsal fin supported by 9 spines and between 24 and 26 soft rays while the anal fin is supported by 6 spines and 24 to 26 soft rays. The body is oval and laterally compressed with an overall brown colour. This is broken by a patch of orange-yellow around the spine on the caudal peduncle. In life there are many wavy, horizontal light blue lines on the head and body. The upper margin of the operculum is yellow. The caudal fin is lunate with a whitish rear margin. The maximum published standard length of 45 cm (18 in).

== Distribution and habitat ==
Acanthurus monroviae is present in the tropical eastern Atlantic Ocean from southern Morocco to Angola, including the Canary Islands, Cape Verde and Gulf of Guinea. It has been observed, but rarely, in the Mediterranean Sea since 1987. Vagrants have also been reported from the coast of Brazil. It is a coastal fish which is found at the mouths of rivers and in lagoons where there are rock and coral substrates at depths between 5 and 500 m (16 and 1,640 ft). this species feeds on zooplankton. phytoplankton and detritus.
