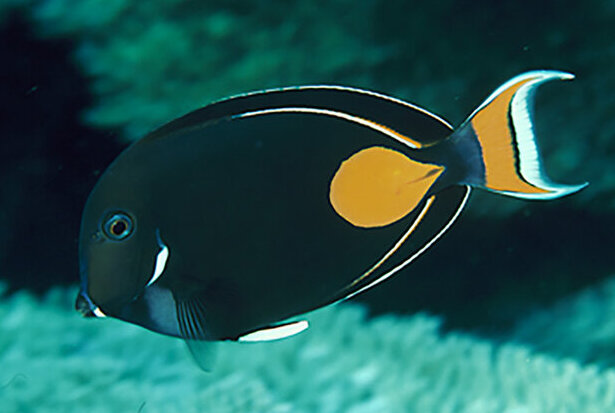
- At Johnston Atoll

Conservation status
- Least Concern (IUCN 3.1)

Scientific classification
- Kingdom: Animalia
- Phylum: Chordata
- Class: Actinopterygii
- Division: Teleostei
- Order: Acanthuriformes
- Family: Acanthuridae
- Genus: Acanthurus
- Species: A. achilles

Binomial name
- Acanthurus achilles Shaw, 1803

Synonyms
- List: Hepatus achilles (Shaw, 1803); Teuthis achilles (Shaw, 1803); Acanthurus aterrimus Günther, 1872; Hepatus aterrimus (Günther, 1872); Teuthis aterrimus (Günther, 1872)

= Acanthurus achilles =

Species of fish

Acanthurus achilles, the Achilles tang, redtail surgeonfish or redspot surgeonfish, is a marine ray-finned fish in the family Acanthuridae, the surgeonfishes, unicornfishes and tangs. This fish is found in various part of the Pacific Ocean.

== Taxonomy ==
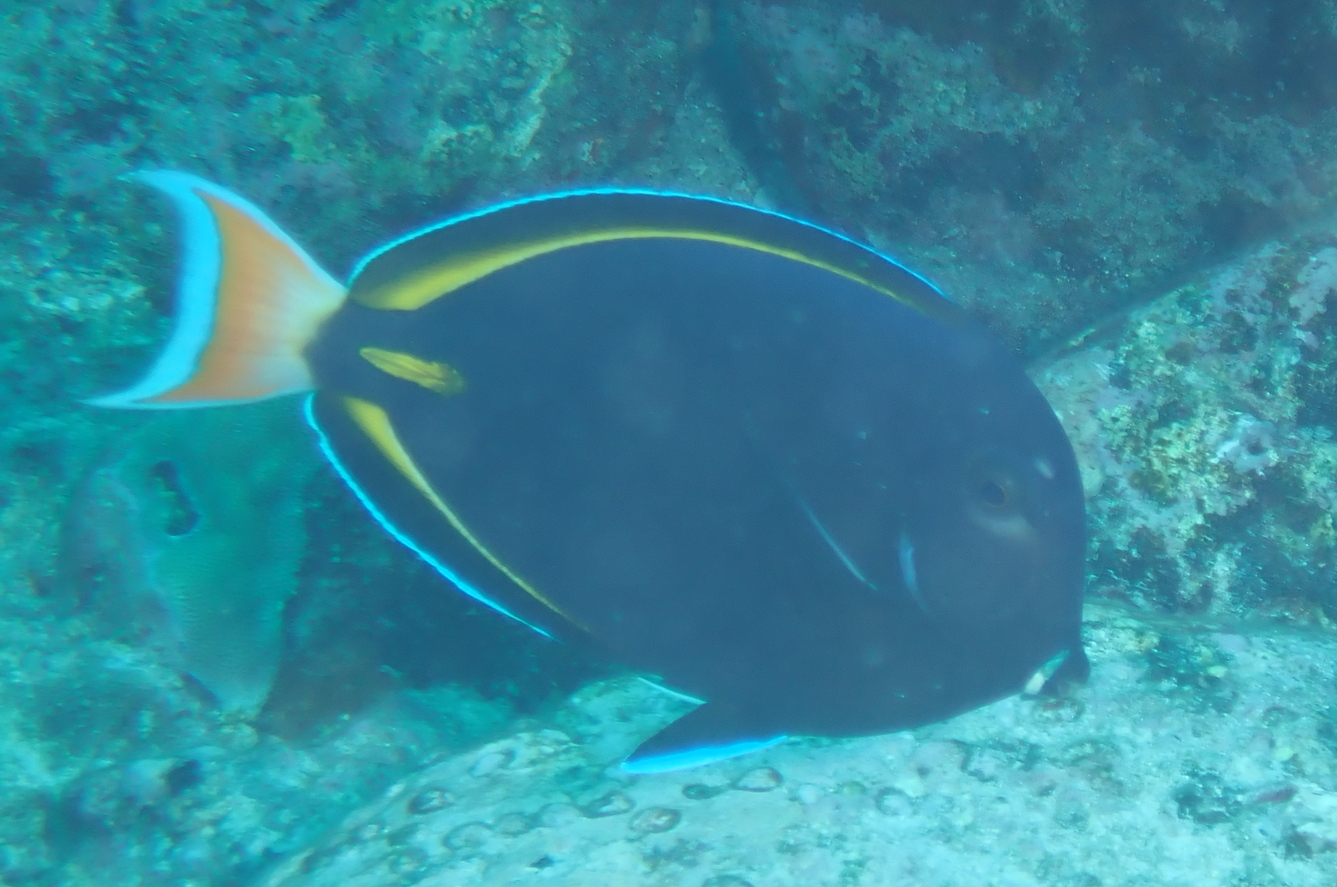
Hybrid (A. achilles × nigricans)

Acanthurus achilles was first formally described in 1803 by the English biologist George Shaw but Shaw did not give a type locality and no type specimen is known.

=== Etymology ===
The choice of the specific name of this species, achilles, was not explained by Shaw. It is thought that the name refers to Achilles, the mythical hero of the Trojan War, and that it alludes to the sharp bony plates on the caudal peduncle.

=== Hybridization ===
Acanthurus achilles is known to hybridize with the congener Acanthurus nigricans.

== Description ==
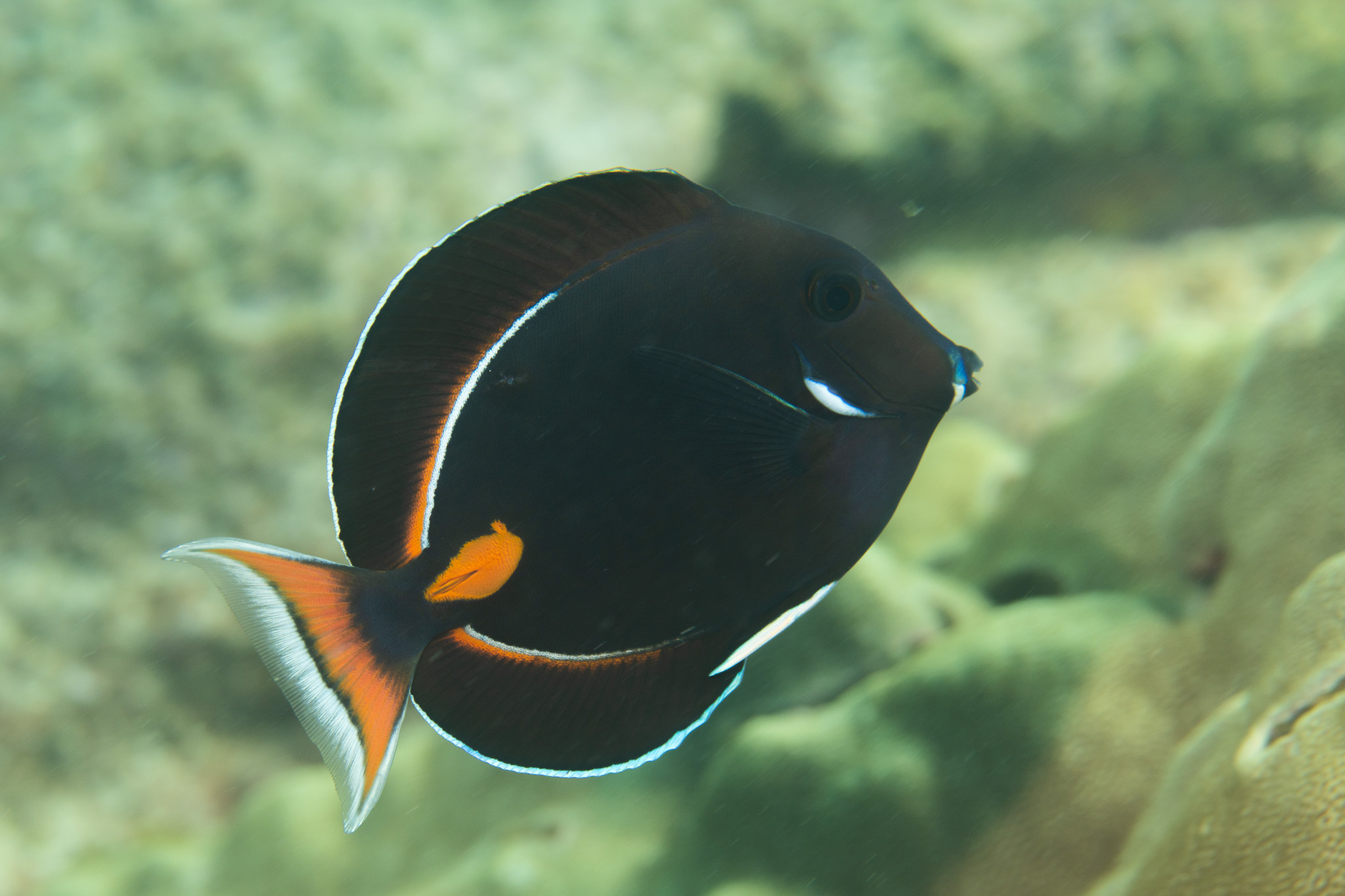
In Hawaii

Acanthurus achilles has an elongated oval-shaped body with a steep dorsal profile to the head. The small, protrusible mouth is positioned low on the head with between 8 and 28 teeth fixed on each jaw, each having a flattened, serrated tip. The dorsal fin is supported by 9 spines and between 29 and 33 soft rays while the anal fin contains 3 spines and 26 to 29 soft rays. There is a single mobile spine on each side of the caudal peduncle which folds down into a slit. The caudal fin is concave. The overall color is bluish-black with an irregular oval orange blotch near the rear of the body and a white bar on the operculum. The caudal fin is predominantly orange, but its posterior margin is white. There is a pale blue ring around just inside the snout tip. This species reaches a maximum total length of 24 cm (9.4 in).

== Distribution and habitat ==
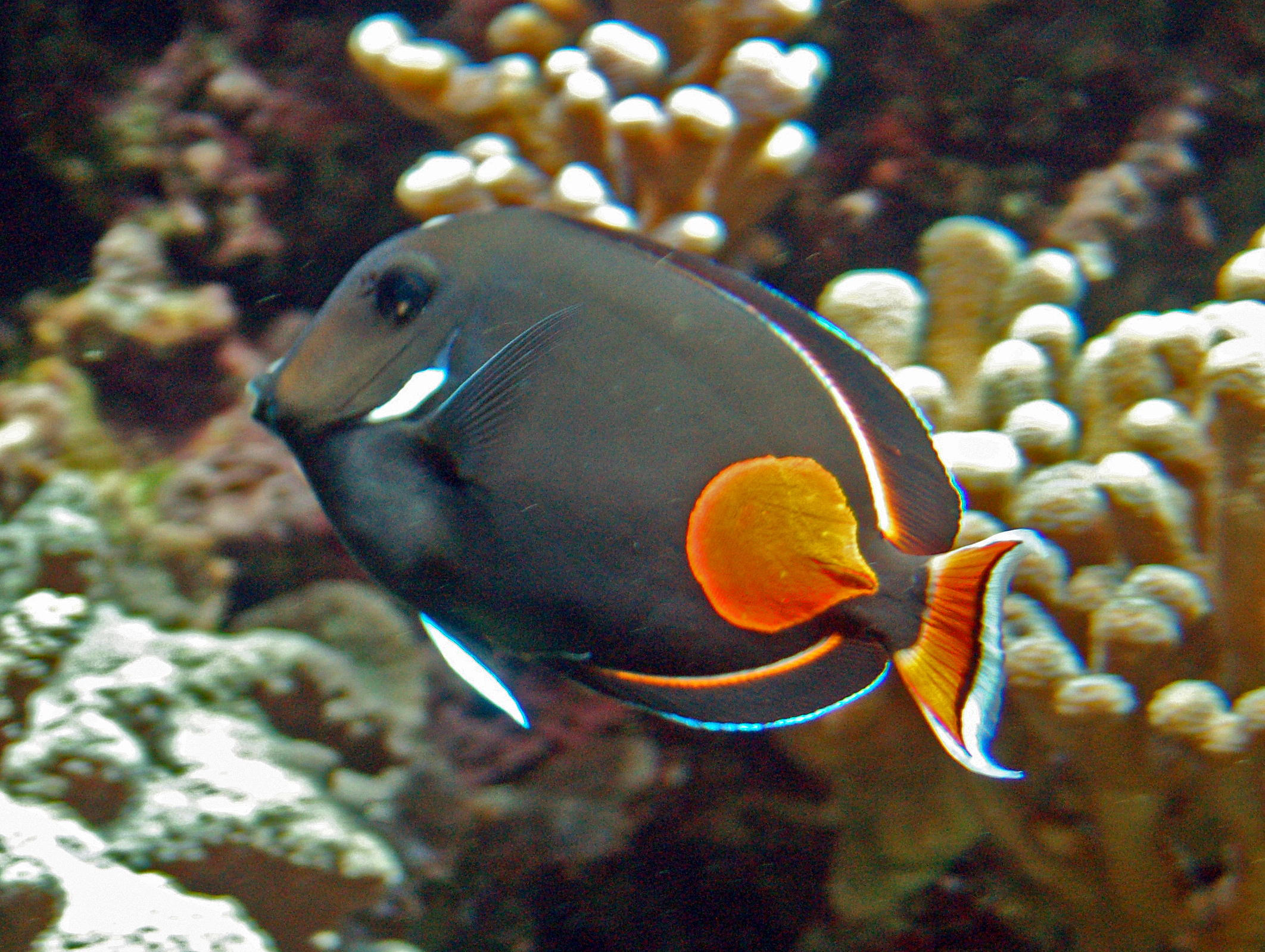
At the Oceanographic Museum of Monaco

Acanthurus achilles is found in various reefs of Oceania, up to the islands of Hawaii and Pitcairn. It is also, although less commonly, found in the Mariana Islands and even some reefs in southern Mexico and Guatemala. It is a benthopelagic species which inhabits the clear waters on the seaward side of reefs.

== Biology ==
Acanthurus achilles is herbivorous, grazing largely on benthic algae. It is territorial and monogamous.
