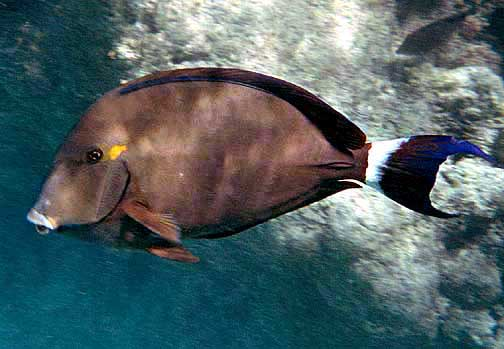

Conservation status
- Least Concern (IUCN 3.1)

Scientific classification
- Kingdom: Animalia
- Phylum: Chordata
- Class: Actinopterygii
- Order: Acanthuriformes
- Family: Acanthuridae
- Genus: Acanthurus
- Species: A. blochii

Binomial name
- Acanthurus blochii Valenciennes, 1835

= Acanthurus blochii =

Ringtail surgeonfish

Species of fish

Acanthurus blochii, the ringtail surgeonfish or dark surgeonfish, is a marine ray-finned fish belonging to the family Acanthuridae, the surgeonfishes, unicornfishes and tangs. This fish is found in the Indo-Pacific.

== Taxonomy ==
Acanthurus blochii was first formally described in 1835 by the French zoologist Achille Valenciennes with its type locality given as Mauritius. The genus Acanthurus is one of two genera in the tribe Acanthurini which is one of three tribes in the subfamily Acanthurinae which is one of two subfamilies in the family Acanthuridae.

== Etymology ==
Acanthurus blochii honours the German physician and naturalist Marcus Elieser Bloch with its specific name. Bloch had originally described this fish as Chaetodon nigricans.

== Description ==
Acanthurus blochii has 9 spines and 25 to 27 soft rays supporting the dorsal fin while the anal fin is supported by 3 spines and 24 or 25 soft rays. It has a relatively large spine on the caudal peduncle, the length of the spine fitting 3 to 4.4 times into the length of the head. The overall colour is blue-grey marked with a yellow spot to the rear of the eye and a white bar on the caudal fin base. There is a dark blotch surrounding the spine on the caudal peduncle. The caudal, dorsal and anal fins are dark blue to black. When seen underwater the overall colour is black broken by a lighter band on the caudal peduncle. This species has a maximum standard length of 45 cm (18 in).

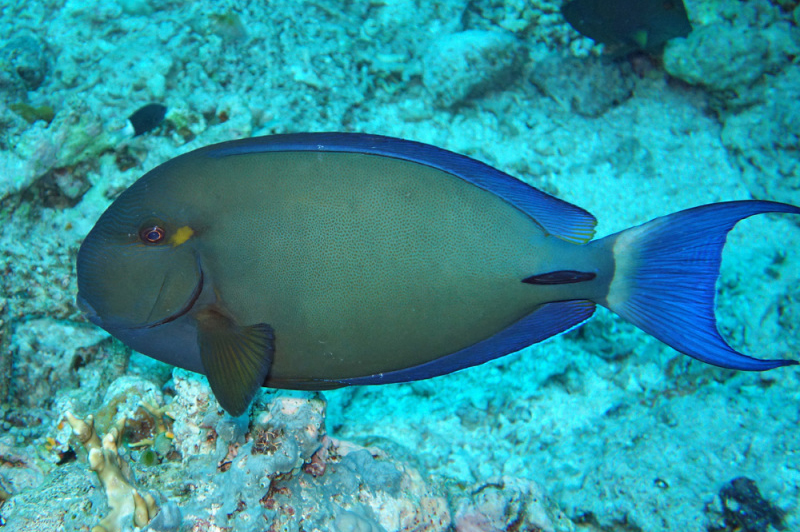
Acanthurus blochii, at the Cod Hole near Lizard Island, Great Barrier Reef, Queensland

== Distribution and habitat ==
Acanthurus blochii has a wide Indo-Pacific distribution from East Africa between Djibouti and South Africa east to Hawaii, south to northern Australia and Lord Howe Island and as far north as the Ryukyu Islands of southern Japan. It is found on the outer slopes and lagoon slopes of coral reefs where it grazes algae and detritus, especially off compacted sand.
