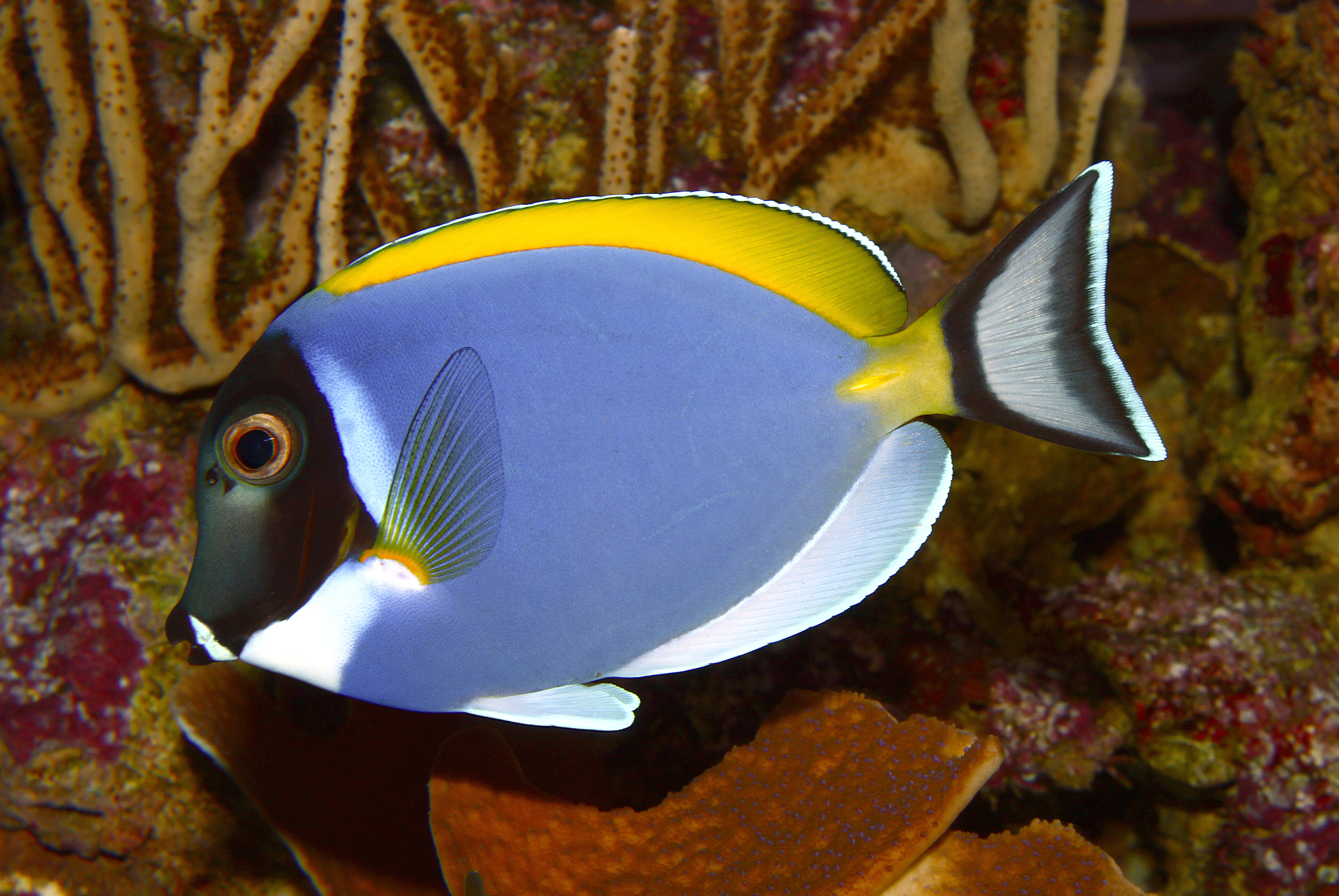
- Acanthurus leucosternon
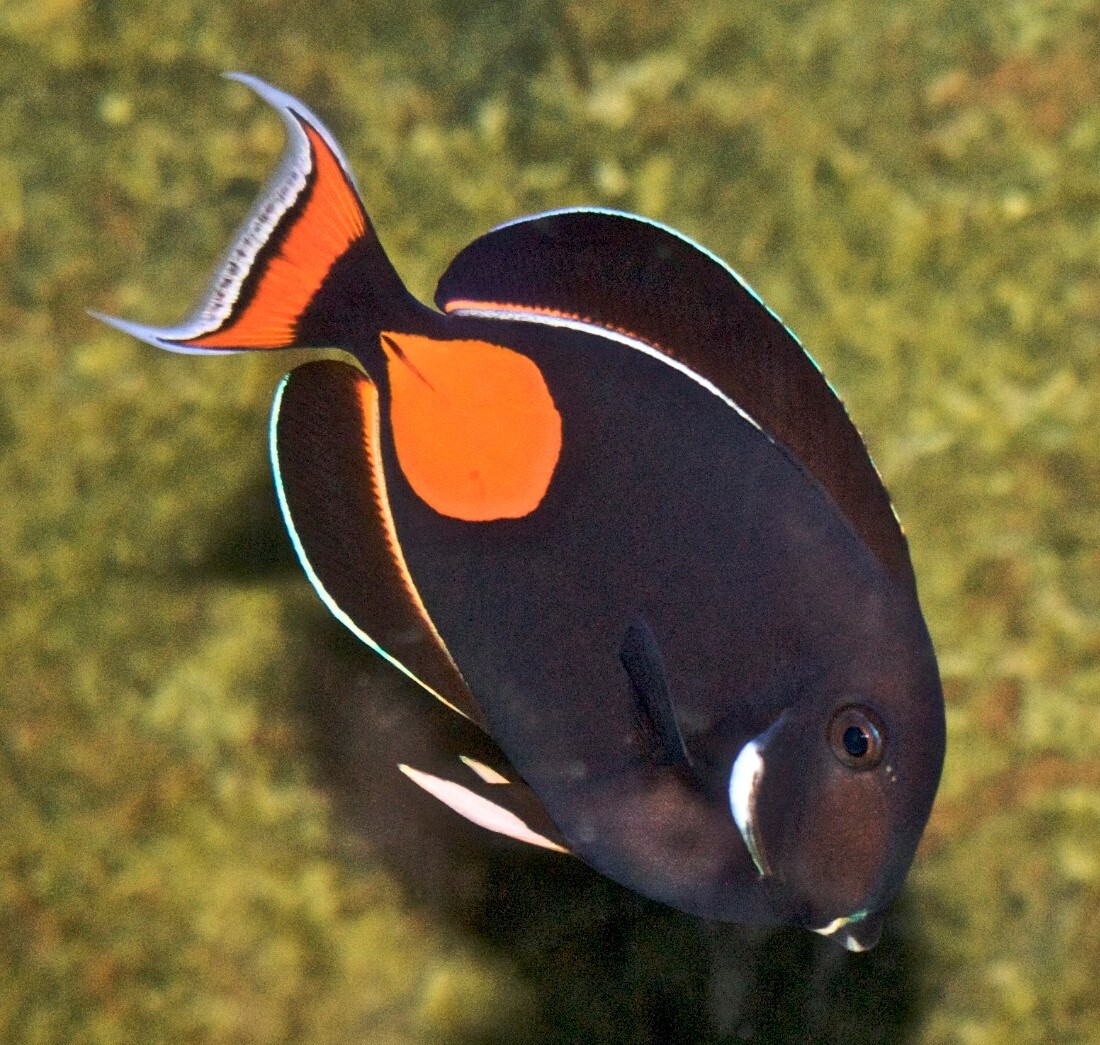
- Acanthurus achilles

Scientific classification
- Kingdom: Animalia
- Phylum: Chordata
- Class: Actinopterygii
- Division: Teleostei
- Order: Acanthuriformes
- Family: Acanthuridae
- Tribe: Acanthurini
- Genus: Acanthurus; Forsskål, 1775

Type species
- Acanthurus triostegus (Linnaeus, 1758)

Species
- See text

Synonyms
- List: Acronurus Gronow in Gray 1854; Aspisurus Lacépède, 1802; Ctenodon Swainson, 1839; Harpurina Fowler & Bean, 1929; Harpurus Johann Reinhold Forster, 1788; Rhomboteuthis Fowler, 1944; Rhombotides Bleeker, 1863; Theutis Bonnaterre, 1788; Theutys Goüan, 1770

= Acanthurus =

Acanthurus Temporal range: Middle Miocene to present

Genus of fishes

Acanthurus is a genus of marine ray-finned fish belonging to the family Acanthuridae, which includes the surgeonfishes, unicornfishes and tangs, found in the Atlantic, Indian and Pacific Ocean. They are found in tropical oceans, especially near coral reefs, with most species in the Indo-Pacific but a few are found in the Atlantic Ocean. As other members of the family, they have a pair of spines, one on either side of the base of the tail which are dangerously sharp. The genus name Acanthurus comes from Ancient Greek ἄκανθα (ákantha), meaning "spine", and οὐρά (ourá), meaning "tail", in reference to the scalpel-like bony plates on the caudal peduncle.

== Taxonomy ==
Acanthurus was first proposed as a subgenus of Chaetodon in 1775 by the Swedish-speaking Finnish explorer, orientalist and naturalist Peter Forsskål, although he recognised that it was probably different from Chaetodon even at the family level. In 1856 Desmarest designated Teuthis hepatus, which had been described from a type now known to have been collected at Ambon Island in the Moluccas (other erroneous type localities were named) in 1758 by Linnaeus, as the type species of the genus. T. hepatus is a synonym of Paracanthurus hepatus and this would make Paracanthurus synonymous with Acanthurus. An alternative would be to use the name Harpurus proposed as a monospecific genus in 1788 by Johann Reinhold Forster when he described Harpurus fasciatus, a synonym of Acanthurus triostegus. It has been proposed that the International Commission on Zoological Nomenclature should be petitioned to stabilise the genera Acanthurus and Paracanthurus. In 2014 it was proposed that the type species of Acanthurus should be Chaetodon sohal, which had also been described by Forsskål in 1775 as a member of the subgenus alongside C. bifasciatus, C. nigrofuscus and C. unicornis, and had been designated as the type species by Jordan and Evermann in 1917.

It has been proposed that the genus Ctenochaetus should be merged with Acanthurus, as Acanthurus is currently paraphyletic. All Ctenochaetus species are nested within Acanthurus, while A. nubilis and A. pyroferus are furthermore nested within Ctenochaetus. The 5th edition of Fishes of the World recognises these two genera as valid and classifies them as the two genera in the tribe Acanthurini of the subfamily Acanthurinae within the family Acanthuridae.

=== Etymology ===
The genus name Acanthurus comes from Ancient Greek ἄκανθα (ákantha), meaning "spine", and οὐρά (ourá), meaning "tail", a reference to the scalpel-like bony plates on the caudal peduncle, these also give rise to the vernacular English names surgeonfish and doctorfish.

== Evolution ==
Fossil remains of Acanthurus are known from the Middle Miocene of the former Paratethys region, including Austria, Croatia, Hungary, and Ukraine. The specimens from Austria and Ukraine are assigned to the extinct species †Acanthurus haueri. Their presence coincides with the Middle Miocene Climatic Optimum, and they likely inhabited coralgal and bryozoan-dominated reefs. Previously, specimens from Monte Bolca in Italy were also assigned to the modern Acanthurus, but they have since been split into their own genera.

== Distribution ==
Acanthrus surgeonfishes are distributed around the world in tropical waters.

== Species ==
There are currently 41 recognized species in this genus:

Species	Common name	Image
Acanthurus achilles G. Shaw, 1803	Achilles surgeonfish	
Acanthurus albimento K. E. Carpenter, J. T. Williams & M. D. Santos, 2017	White-chin surgeonfish	
Acanthurus albipectoralis G. R. Allen & Ayling, 1987	White-fin surgeonfish	
Acanthurus auranticavus J. E. Randall, 1956	Orange-socket surgeonfish	
Acanthurus bahianus Castelnau, 1855	Barber surgeonfish	
Acanthurus bariene Lesson, 1831	Black-spot surgeonfish	
Acanthurus blochii Valenciennes, 1835	Ring-tail surgeonfish	
Acanthurus chirurgus (Bloch, 1787)	Doctorfish tang	
Acanthurus chronixis J. E. Randall, 1960	Chronixis surgeonfish	
Acanthurus coeruleus Bloch & J. G. Schneider, 1801	Atlantic blue tang	
Acanthurus dussumieri Valenciennes, 1835	Eye-stripe surgeonfish	
Acanthurus fowleri de Beaufort, 1951	Fowler's surgeonfish	
Acanthurus gahhm (Forsskål, 1775)	Black surgeonfish	
Acanthurus grammoptilus J. Richardson, 1843	Fine-lined surgeonfish	
Acanthurus guttatus J. R. Forster, 1801	White-spotted surgeonfish	
Acanthurus japonicus (P. J. Schmidt, 1931)	Japan surgeonfish	
Acanthurus leucocheilus Herre, 1927	Pale-lipped surgeonfish	
Acanthurus leucopareius (O. P. Jenkins, 1903)	White-bar surgeonfish	
Acanthurus leucosternon E. T. Bennett, 1833	Powder-blue surgeonfish	
Acanthurus lineatus (Linnaeus, 1758)	Lined surgeonfish	
Acanthurus maculiceps (C. G. E. Ahl, 1923)	White-freckled surgeonfish	
Acanthurus mata (G. Cuvier, 1829)	Elongate surgeonfish	
Acanthurus monroviae Steindachner, 1876	Monrovia surgeonfish	
Acanthurus nigricans (Linnaeus, 1758)	White-cheek surgeonfish	
Acanthurus nigricauda Duncker & Mohr (de), 1929	Epaulette surgeonfish	
Acanthurus nigrofuscus (Forsskål, 1775)	Brown surgeonfish	
Acanthurus nigroris Valenciennes, 1835	Blue-lined surgeonfish	
Acanthurus nigros Günther, 1861	Grey-head surgeonfish	
Acanthurus nubilus (Fowler & B. A. Bean, 1929)	Pin-striped surgeonfish	
Acanthurus olivaceus Bloch & J. G. Schneider, 1801	Orange-spot surgeonfish	
Acanthurus polyzona (Bleeker, 1868)	Black-barred surgeonfish	
Acanthurus pyroferus Kittlitz, 1834	Chocolate surgeonfish	
Acanthurus randalli J. C. Briggs & D. K. Caldwell, 1957		
Acanthurus reversus J. E. Randall & Earle, 1999		
Acanthurus sohal (Forsskål, 1775)	Sohal surgeonfish	
Acanthurus tennentii Günther, 1861	Double-band surgeonfish	
Acanthurus thompsoni (Fowler, 1923)	Thompson's surgeonfish	
Acanthurus tractus F. Poey, 1860	Ocean surgeonfish	
Acanthurus triostegus (Linnaeus, 1758)	Convict surgeonfish	
Acanthurus tristis J. E. Randall, 1993	Indian Ocean mimic surgeonfish	
Acanthurus xanthopterus Valenciennes, 1835	Yellow-fin surgeonfish	

=== Fossil species ===
- †Acanthurus haueri (von Meyer, 1842) (Middle Miocene of Austria and Ukraine)

== Characteristics ==
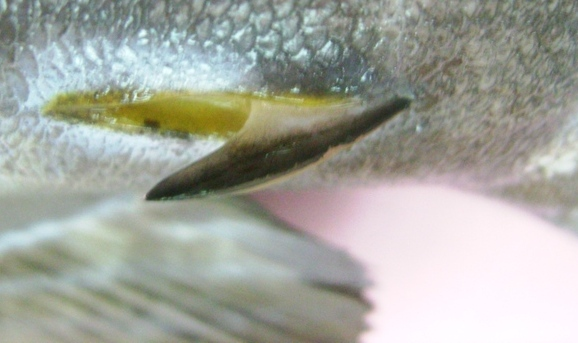
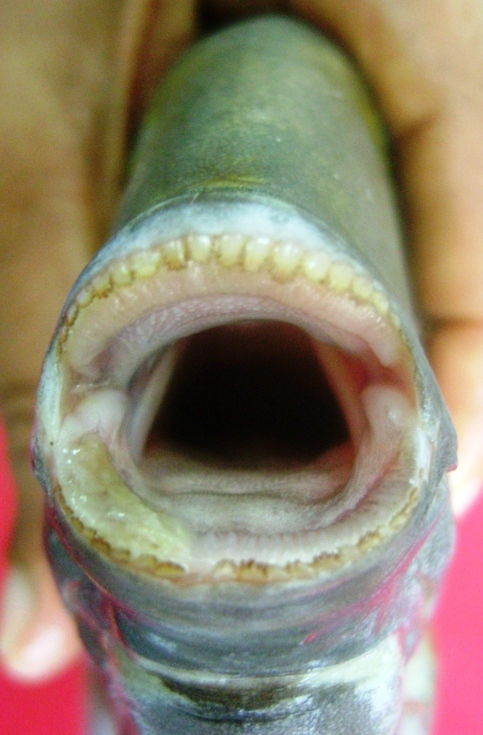
A. xanthopterus tail spine and teeth

Acanthurus surgeonfishes have disc shaped, highly laterally compressed bodies with a steep dorsal profile to the head. They have a small mouth positioned low on the head and the fish can protrude the jaws. The 8 to 28 teeth in the jaws are fixed and have flattened, serrated tips. There are typically 11 spines in the dorsal fin. There is a single spine on each side of the caudal peduncle and these can be pressed down into a groove.

The Indo-Pacific yellowfin surgeonfish (A. xanthopterus) is the largest species with a maximum published total length of 70 cm (28 in) while the smallest is the black-barred surgeonfish (A. polyzona) with a maximum published total length of 11 cm (4.3 in).
