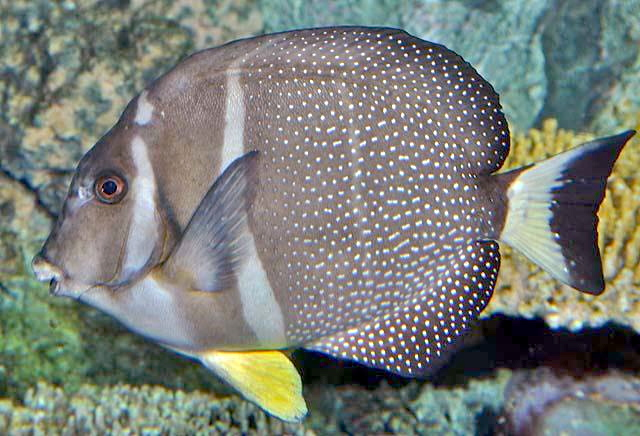

Conservation status
- Least Concern (IUCN 3.1)

Scientific classification
- Kingdom: Animalia
- Phylum: Chordata
- Class: Actinopterygii
- Division: Teleostei
- Order: Acanthuriformes
- Family: Acanthuridae
- Genus: Acanthurus
- Species: A. guttatus

Binomial name
- Acanthurus guttatus J. R. Forster, 1801

Synonyms
- List: Harpurus guttatus (Forster, 1801); Hepatus guttatus (Forster, 1801); Rhombotides guttatus (Forster, 1801); Teuthis guttatus (Forster, 1801); Zabrasoma guttatus (Forster, 1801)

= Acanthurus guttatus =

Species of fish

Acanthurus guttatus, the whitespotted surgeonfish, spotted surgeonfish, mustard surgeonfish, mustard tang or spotband surgeonfish, is a species of marine ray-finned fish belonging to the family Acanthuridae, the surgeonfishes, unicornfishes or tangs. It is found in shallow waters on reefs in the Indo-Pacific.

== Description ==
The whitespotted surgeonfish is deep-bodied and laterally compressed. The basic colour is grey which darkens towards the posterior and the body is liberally spotted with white. There is a band of white just behind the eye stretching from the operculum to the nape of the neck. Another white band encircles the fish just behind the yellow pelvic fins. The other fins are dark coloured except for the rather small caudal fin which is half pale yellow and half black. The dorsal fin has 9 spines and 27 to 30 soft rays. The anal fin has 3 spines and 23 to 26 rays and the pectoral fin has 17 to 20 rays. The fish grows to a maximum length of 26 cm (10 in).

== Distribution and habitat ==
The whitespotted surgeonfish is found in shallow water in the Indo-Pacific. Its native range extends from Mauritius to southern Japan, Indonesia and northern Australia but in 2003, it was observed off the coast of Florida in the vicinity of Palm Beach. Its main habitat is exposed reefs and rocky shores where it occurs in groups. Its spots may provide camouflage in the churned up, bubble-filled water.

== Biology ==
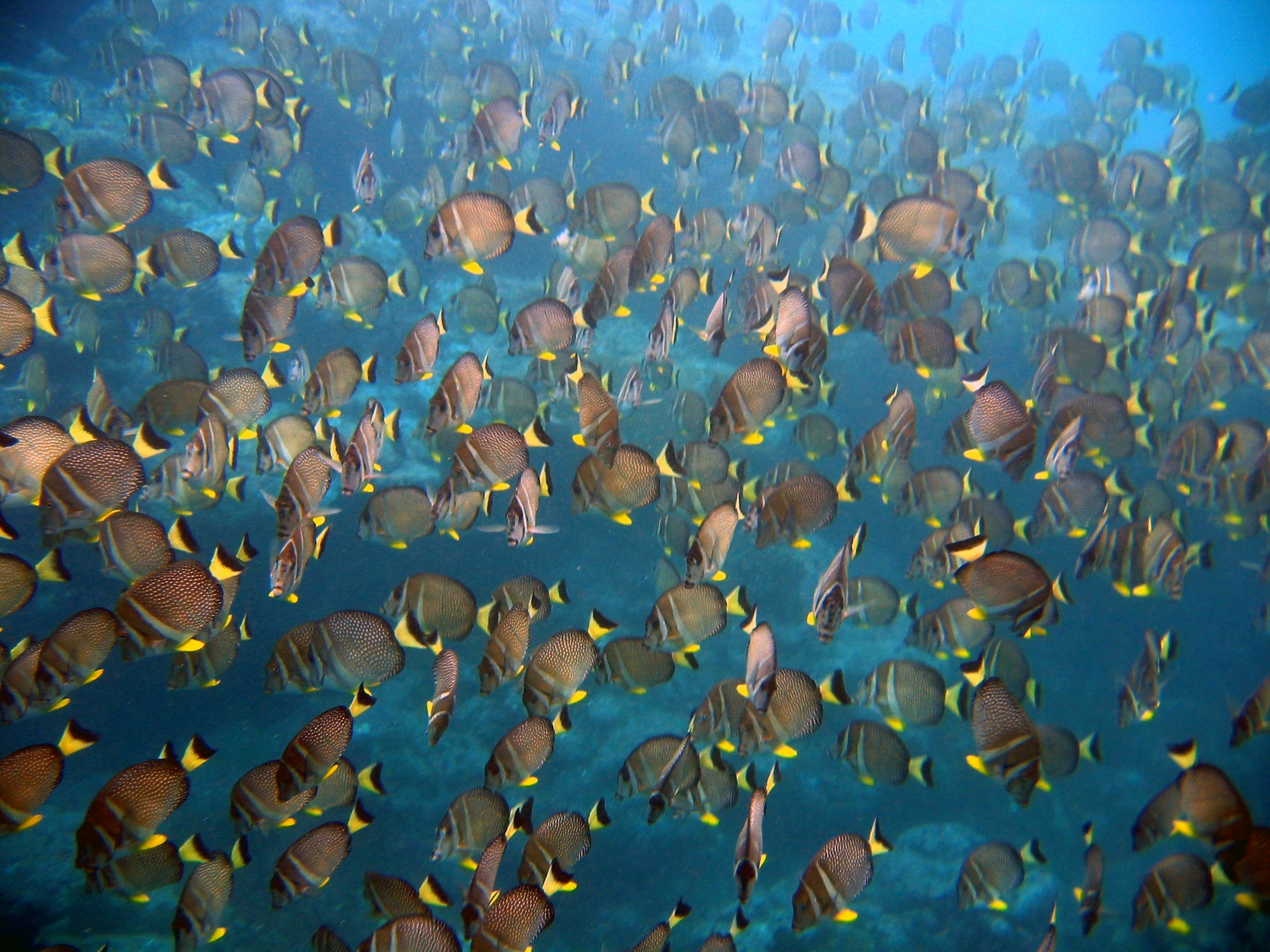
Schooling, in American Samoa

The whitespotted surgeonfish feeds on filamentous algae and calcareous algae. It is considered to form an important link between algae, the primary producers in the ocean, and the detrital food web in the Pacific Ocean.

In American Samoa, breeding takes place all year round with eggs being deposited in drainage channels in the reef at dusk.
