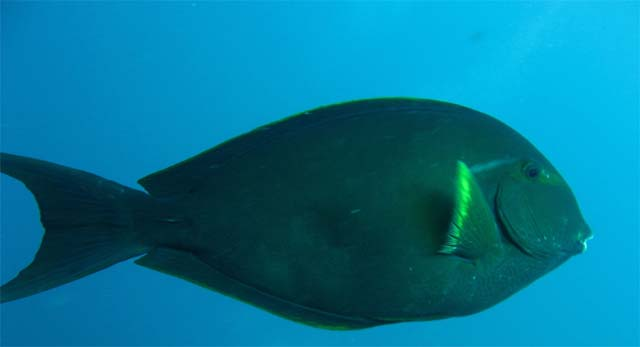

Conservation status
- Least Concern (IUCN 3.1)

Scientific classification
- Kingdom: Animalia
- Phylum: Chordata
- Class: Actinopterygii
- Order: Acanthuriformes
- Family: Acanthuridae
- Genus: Acanthurus
- Species: A. albipectoralis

Binomial name
- Acanthurus albipectoralis G. R. Allen & Ayling, 1987

= Acanthurus albipectoralis =

Species of fish

Acanthurus albipectoralis, the whitefin surgeonfish, is a species of marine ray-finned fish belonging to the family Acanthuridae, the surgeonfishes, unicornfishes and tangs. This species is found in the Western Pacific Ocean.

== Taxonomy ==
Acanthurus albipectoralis Was first formally described in 1987 by Gerald R. Allen and Anthony Michael Ayling with its type locality given as Swain Reef in the Great Barrier Reef off Queensland. The genus Acanthurus is one of two genera in the tribe Acanthurini which is one of three tribes in the subfamily Acanthurinae which is one of two subfamilies in the family Acanthuridae.

== Etymology ==
Acanthurus albipectoralish has the specific nae albipectoralis which is a compound of albus, meaning "white", and pectoralis, meaning "pectoral". This is a reference to the white distal part of the pectoral fins contrasting with the overall black colour of this fish.

== Description ==
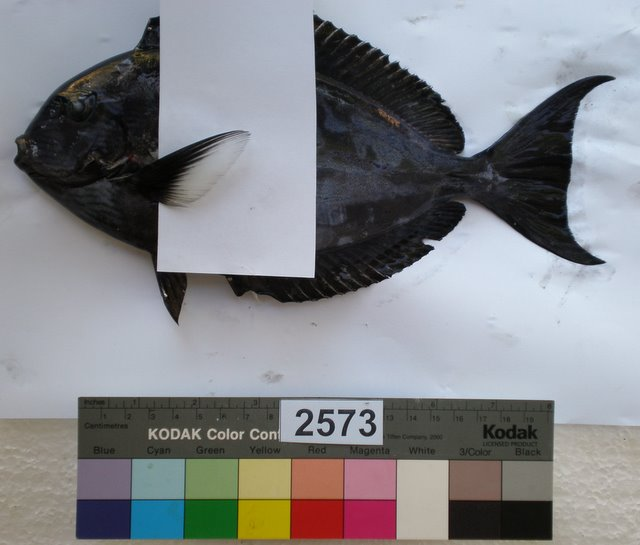
Acanthurus albipectoralis (with paper to show white fin)

Acanthurus albipectoralis has an oblong, laterally compressed body with a blunt snout. The dorsal and anal fins are relatively long and low and are supported by 8 or 9 spines and between 22 and 33 soft rays for the dorsal fin and 3 spines and between 18 and 31 soft rays for the anal fin. The caudal fin is crescentic and has pointed tips on each lobe. The overall colour is black without any wavy blue lines. The pectoral fin has a blackish base and a clear white distal portion. This species attains a maximum published standard length of 33 cm (13 in).

== Distribution and habitat ==
Acanthurus albipectoralis is found in the southwestern Pacific Ocean from eastern Australia to Tonga. They are found on the exposed outer slopes of reefs, typically in small groups high in the water column feeding on zooplankton.
