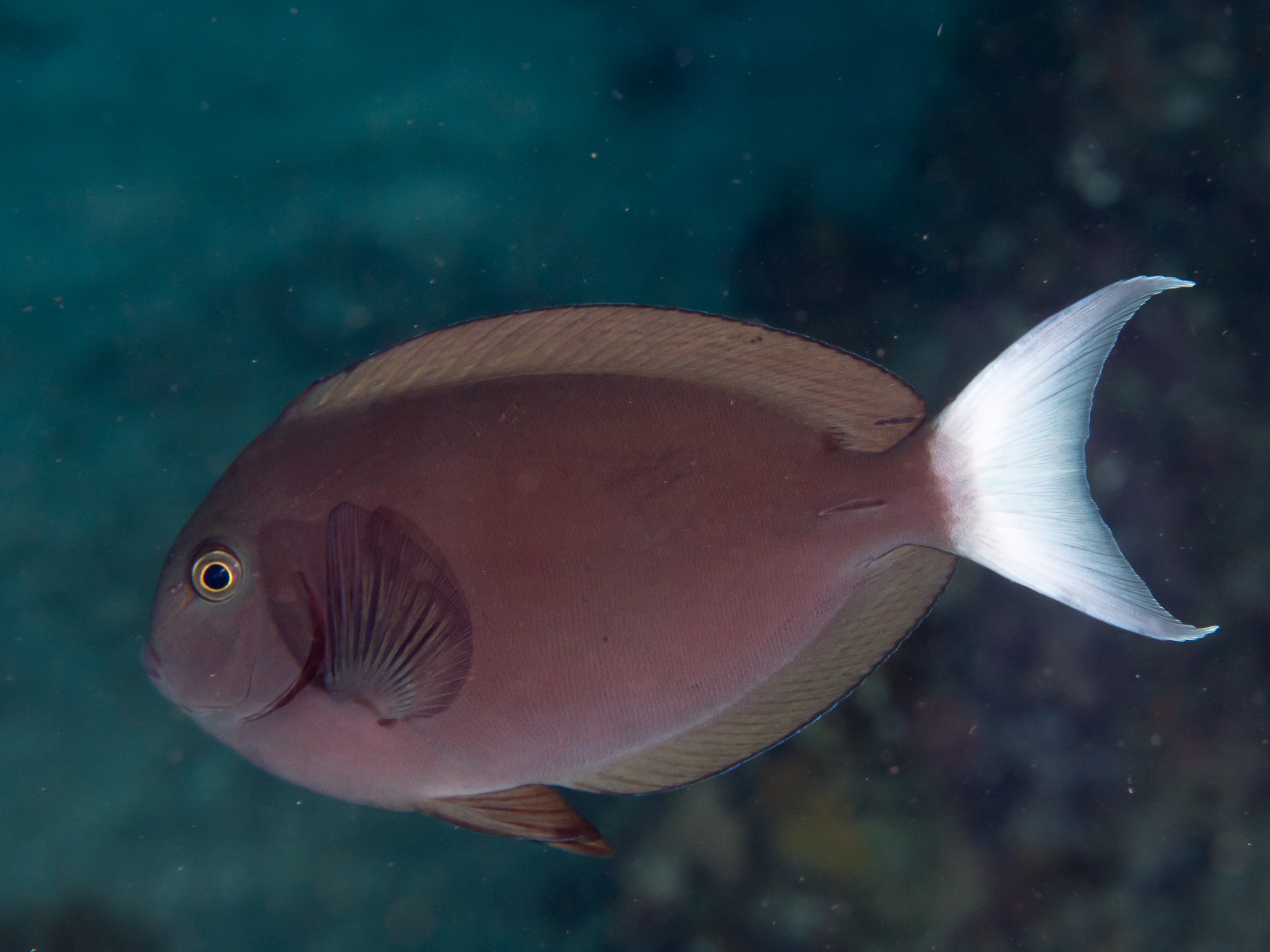

Conservation status
- Least Concern (IUCN 3.1)

Scientific classification
- Kingdom: Animalia
- Phylum: Chordata
- Class: Actinopterygii
- Order: Acanthuriformes
- Family: Acanthuridae
- Genus: Acanthurus
- Species: A. thompsoni

Binomial name
- Acanthurus thompsoni (Fowler, 1923)

Synonyms
- Hepatus thompsoni Fowler, 1923; Teuthis thompsoni (Fowler, 1923); Acanthurus philippinus Herre, 1927; Hepatus philippinus (Herre, 1927)

= Acanthurus thompsoni =

Species of fish

Acanthurus thompsoni, the night surgeonfish, chocolate surgeonfish, Thompson's surgeonfish, Thompson's tang or whitetail surgeonfish, is a species of marine ray-finned fish belonging to the family Acanthuridae which includes the surgeonfishes, unicornfishes and tangs. This species has a wide Indo-Pacific distribution.

== Taxonomy ==
Acanthurus thompsoni was first formalled described in 1923 as Hepatus thompsoni by the American zoologist Henry Weed Fowler with its type locality given as Oahu in Hawaii. The genus Acanthurus is one of two genera in the tribe Acanthurini which is one of three tribes in the subfamily Acanthurinae which is one of two subfamilies in the family Acanthuridae.

== Etymology ==
Acanthurus thompsoni has a specific name honouring John W. Thompson, an artist and modeller at the Bishop Museum in Honolulu who received the type specimen.

== Description ==
Acanthurus thompsoni has its dorsal fin supported by 9 spines and between 23 and 26 soft rays while its anal fin is supported by 3 spines and between 23 and 26 soft rays. The pectoral fins have 17 fin rays. In adults there are 20 or 21 teeth in the upper jaw and 24 teeth in the lower jaw. The oblong body has a depth which is less than half its standard length. The dorsal profile of the head is clearly convex and the snout is short. This species has a maximum published total length of 27 cm (11 in). The overall colour is uniformly brown with a white caudal fin and a small, dark spot behind the base of the pectoral fin.

== Distribution and habitat ==
Acanthurus thompsoni has a wide Indo-Pacific distribution. It is absent from the Red Sea but occurs along the eastern coast of Africa from the Gulf of Aden, although its occurrence in Somalia is not yet confirmed, south to Sodwana Bay in South Africa. It is then found across the Indian Ocean east into the Pacific Ocean as far east as the Pitcairn Islands and Hawaii, south to the Great Barrier Reef and New Caledonia and north to Kochi Prefecture of southern Japan.In Australian waters this species is found at Christmas Island, the Cocos (Keeling) Islands, Rowley Shoals, Scott Reef, Ashmore Reef and the northern Great Barrier Reef as well as reefs in the Coral Sea. This species has been reported from water as deep as 75 m (246 ft) but it is typically found in water at depths of less than 30 m (98 ft). It lives in sandy and coral areas in clear water on steep drop offs and outer reef slopes.

== Biology ==
Acanthurus thompsoni lives singly or in small groups and feeds on zooplankton.

== Utilisation ==
Acanthuris thompsoni is traded in the aquarium trade but is not a major part of that trade. It is fished for as a food fish in Thailand.
