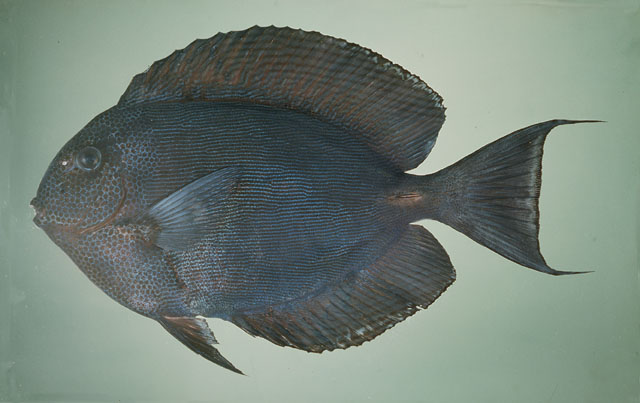

Conservation status
- Least Concern (IUCN 3.1)

Scientific classification
- Kingdom: Animalia
- Phylum: Chordata
- Class: Actinopterygii
- Order: Acanthuriformes
- Family: Acanthuridae
- Genus: Acanthurus
- Species: A. nubilus

Binomial name
- Acanthurus nubilus (Fowler & B. A. Bean, 1929)

Synonyms
- Hepatus nubilus Fowler & Bean, 1929; Harpurina nubilus (Fowler & Bean, 1929)

= Acanthurus nubilus =

Species of fish

Acanthurus nubilus, the bluelined surgeon, pin-striped surgeon, dark surgeonfish or dropoff surgeonfish, is a species of marine ray-finned fish belonging to the family Acanthuridae, which includes the surgeonfishes, unicornfishes and tangs. This species is found in the Western Pacific Ocean.

== Taxonomy ==
Acanthurus nubilus was first formally described as Hepatus nubilus in 1929 by the American ichthyologists Henry Weed Fowler and Barton Appler Bean with its type locality given as Dodepo Island on the Gulf of Tomini off Sulawesi. The genus Acanthurus is one of two genera in the tribe Acanthurini which is one of three tribes in the subfamily Acanthurinae which is one of two subfamilies in the family Acanthuridae.

== Etymology ==
Acanthurus nubilus has the specific name nubilus, which means "cloudy", and is a reference to the overall dull dark colour of this fish with dusky median and pelvic fins.

== Description ==
Acanthurus nubilus has its dorsal fin supported by 6 or 7 spines and between 25 and 27 soft rays while the anal fin is supported by 3 spines and 23 or 24 soft rays. The head and front part of the body are bluish-grey with many dense brown or brownish-yellow spots, which change into horizontal lines towards the rear of the body. This species has a maximum published total length of 26 cm (10 in).

== Distribution and habitat ==
Acanthurus nubilus is found in the western Pacific Ocean where it has been recorded from Indonesia, the Society Islands and the New Caledonia and has been reported from the Austral Islands, Pitcairn Islands, the Philippines and the Marianas. It is found at depths between 25 and 90 m (82 and 295 ft) on steep drop offs exposed to strong currents where it feeds on plankton.
