= Acanthurus chronixis =

Conservation status
- Vulnerable (IUCN 3.1)

Scientific classification
- Kingdom: Animalia
- Phylum: Chordata
- Class: Actinopterygii
- Order: Acanthuriformes
- Family: Acanthuridae
- Genus: Acanthurus
- Species: A. chronixis

Binomial name
- Acanthurus chronixis J. E. Randall, 1960

Species of fish

Acanthurus chronixis the chronixis surgeonfish, Kapingamarangi surgeonfish or the half black mimic surgeonfish is a species of marine ray-finned fish belonging to the family Acanthuridae, the surgeonfishes, unicornfishes and tangs. This fish is found in the western Pacific Ocean.

== Taxonomy ==
Acanthurus chronixis was first formally described in 1960 by the American ichthyologist John Ernest Randall with its type locality given as Teawataman Ship Pass on the southern side of Kapingamarangi Atoll in the Caroline Islands. The genus Acanthurus is one of two genera in the tribe Acanthurini which is one of three tribes in the subfamily Acanthurinae which is one of two subfamilies in the family Acanthuridae.

== Description ==
Acanthurus chronixis is known from only a few specimens . The colour in life is not known but in the type the colour of the preserved fish is brown with two white spots around the gill opening and a dark brown band around the caudal peduncle.. The dorsal fin is supported by 8 spines and 26 soft rays while the anal fin has 3 spines and 24 soft rays. This specimen had a total length of 28 cm (11 in).

== Distribution and habitat ==
Acanthurus chronixis is found in the Western Pacific Ocean where it has been only definitely recorded from Kapingamarangi Atoll in the Caroline Islands. Records from Japan and Taiwan are thought to be misidentifications of Acanthurus pyroferus. The type was collected in water 6 m (20 ft) deep over a mixed coral and sand substrate.

== Status ==
Acanthurus chronixis has a very restricted known distribution and is assessed as Vulnerable by the IUCN.
