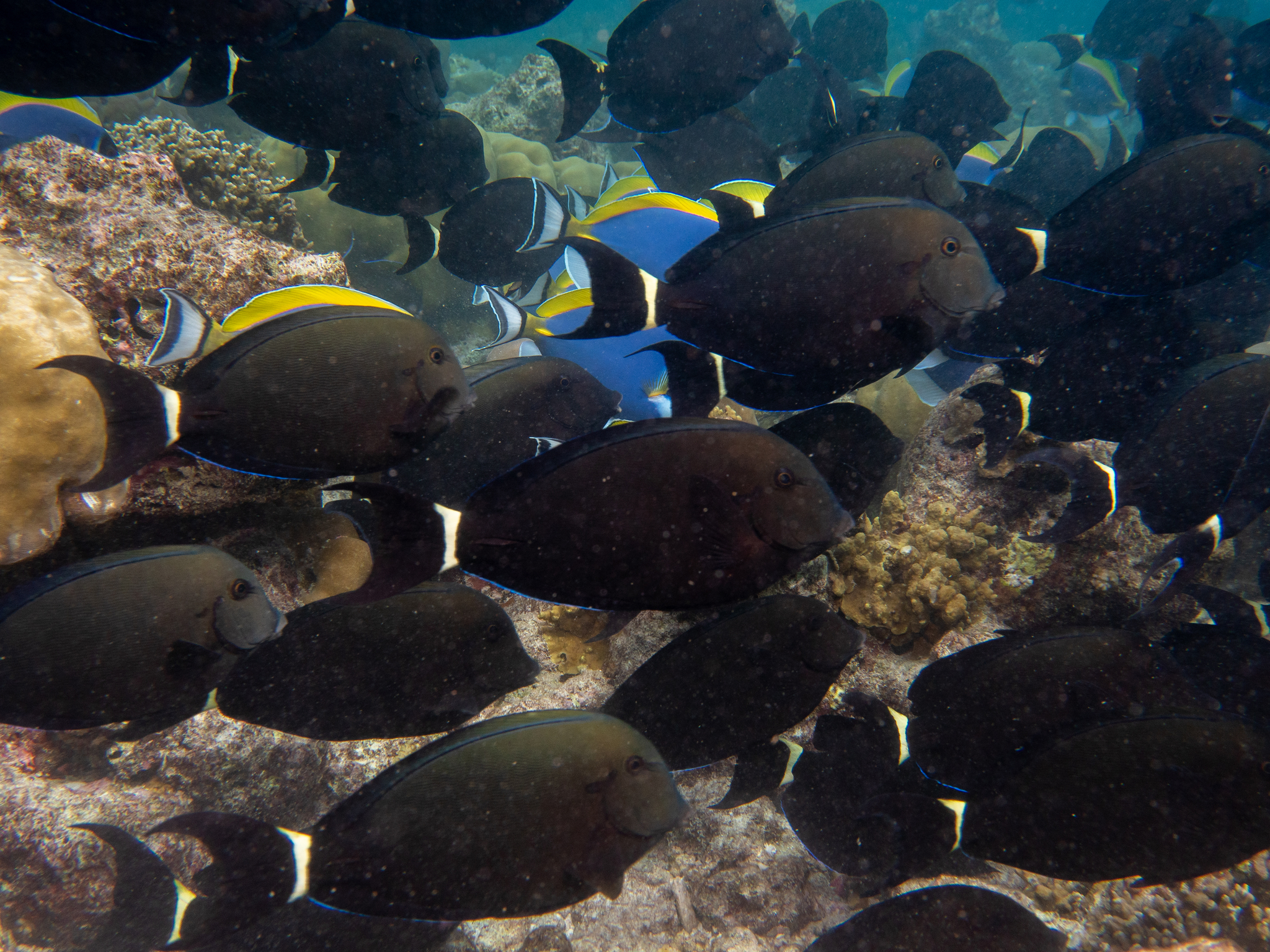

Conservation status
- Least Concern (IUCN 3.1)

Scientific classification
- Kingdom: Animalia
- Phylum: Chordata
- Class: Actinopterygii
- Order: Acanthuriformes
- Family: Acanthuridae
- Genus: Acanthurus
- Species: A. auranticavus

Binomial name
- Acanthurus auranticavus J. E. Randall, 1956

= Acanthurus auranticavus =

Species of fish

Acanthurus auranticavus, the ringtail surgeonfish or orange-socket surgeonfish, is a species of marine ray-finned fish belonging to the family Acanthuridae, the surgeonfishes, unicornfishes and tangs. This species is found in the Indo-West Pacific.

== Taxonomy ==
Acanthurus auranticavus was first formally described in 1956 by the American ichthyologist John Ernest Randall with its type locality give as Ataluyan Island in the Lagonoy Gulf off the eastern coast of Luzon in the Philippines. The genus Acanthurus is one of two genera in the tribe Acanthurini which is one of three tribes in the subfamily Acanthurinae which is one of two subfamilies in the family Acanthuridae.

== Etymology ==
Acanthurus auranticavus has a specific name, auranticavus, which is a compound of aurantia, meaning "orange", and cavus, meaning "cavity". This is a reference to the orange colour of the socket holding the spine on the caudal peduncle.

== Description ==
Acanthurus auranticavus has 9 spines and 25 or 26 soft rays supporting the dorsal fin while the anal fin is supported by 3 spines and 23 or 24 soft rays. The sharp spine on the caudal peduncle is large and is between a quarter and half of the length of the head. The overall colour is dark brown with an area diffused with orange brown beneath the pectoral fin. The socket containing the spine on the caudal peduncle is orange and there are orange blotches to the front and rear of the pupil. There is a white band around the base of the caudal fin. This species has a maximum published standard length of 45 cm (18 in).

== Distribution and habitat ==
Acanthurus auranticavus is found in the Indian and Western PacificOceans. In the Indian Ocean it has been reported from the Maldives and the Seychelles, and recently Christmas Island. In the Western Pacific it is more widespread being found from the Philippines, Indonesia, Malaysia, Samoa, the Solomon Islands and Papua New Guinea. In Australia it is found on the northern Great Barrier Reef and other reefs in the Coral Sea, possibly as far south as Lady Elliot Island in Queensland. It has also been found at Ashmore Reef, Scott reef and Rowley Shoals in the Timor Sea. Adults are encountered in the vicinity of shallow water reefs in both the lagoon and outer reef zones and they often swim in schools, sometimes in mixed species schools. Juveniles live in shallow water down to 2 m (6 ft 7 in) among soft corals.
