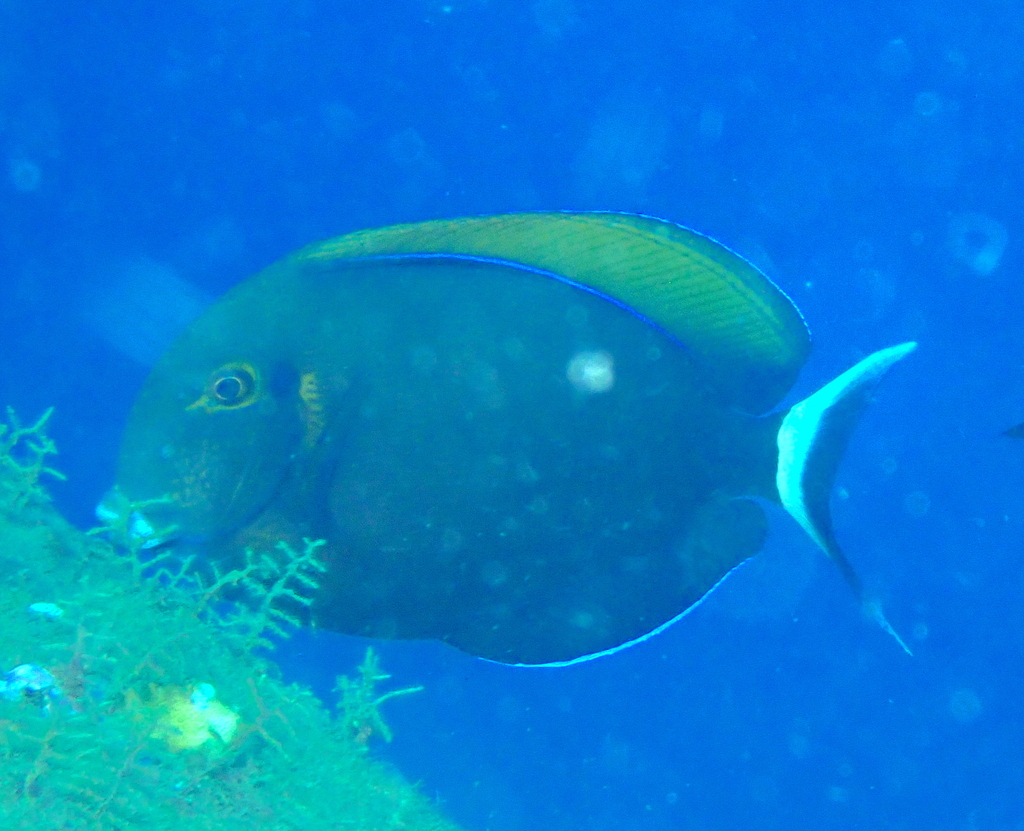

Conservation status
- Least Concern (IUCN 3.1)

Scientific classification
- Kingdom: Animalia
- Phylum: Chordata
- Class: Actinopterygii
- Division: Teleostei
- Order: Acanthuriformes
- Family: Acanthuridae
- Genus: Acanthurus
- Species: A. bariene

Binomial name
- Acanthurus bariene Lesson, 1831

Synonyms
- Hepatus bariene (Lesson, 1831); Acanthurus kingii Bennett, 1835; Acanthurus nummifer Valenciennes, 1835; Rhombotides nummifer (Valenciennes, 1835)

= Acanthurus bariene =

Species of fish

Acanthurus bariene, the bariene surgeonfish, black-spot surgeonfish, or eye-spot surgeonfish, is a species of marine ray-finned fish belonging to the family Acanthuridae, the surgeonfishes, unicornfishes and tangs. This species is found in the Indo-Pacific.

== Taxonomy ==
Acanthurus bariene was first formally described in 1835 by the French zoologist René Primevère Lesson with its type locality given as Offack Bay on Waigeo in Indonesia. The genus Acanthurus is one of two genera in the tribe Acanthurini which is one of three tribes in the subfamily Acanthurinae which is one of two subfamilies in the family Acanthuridae.

== Etymology ==
Acanthurus bariene has a specific name, bariene, which is derived from barîène, the local name for surgeonfishes at the type locality.

== Description ==
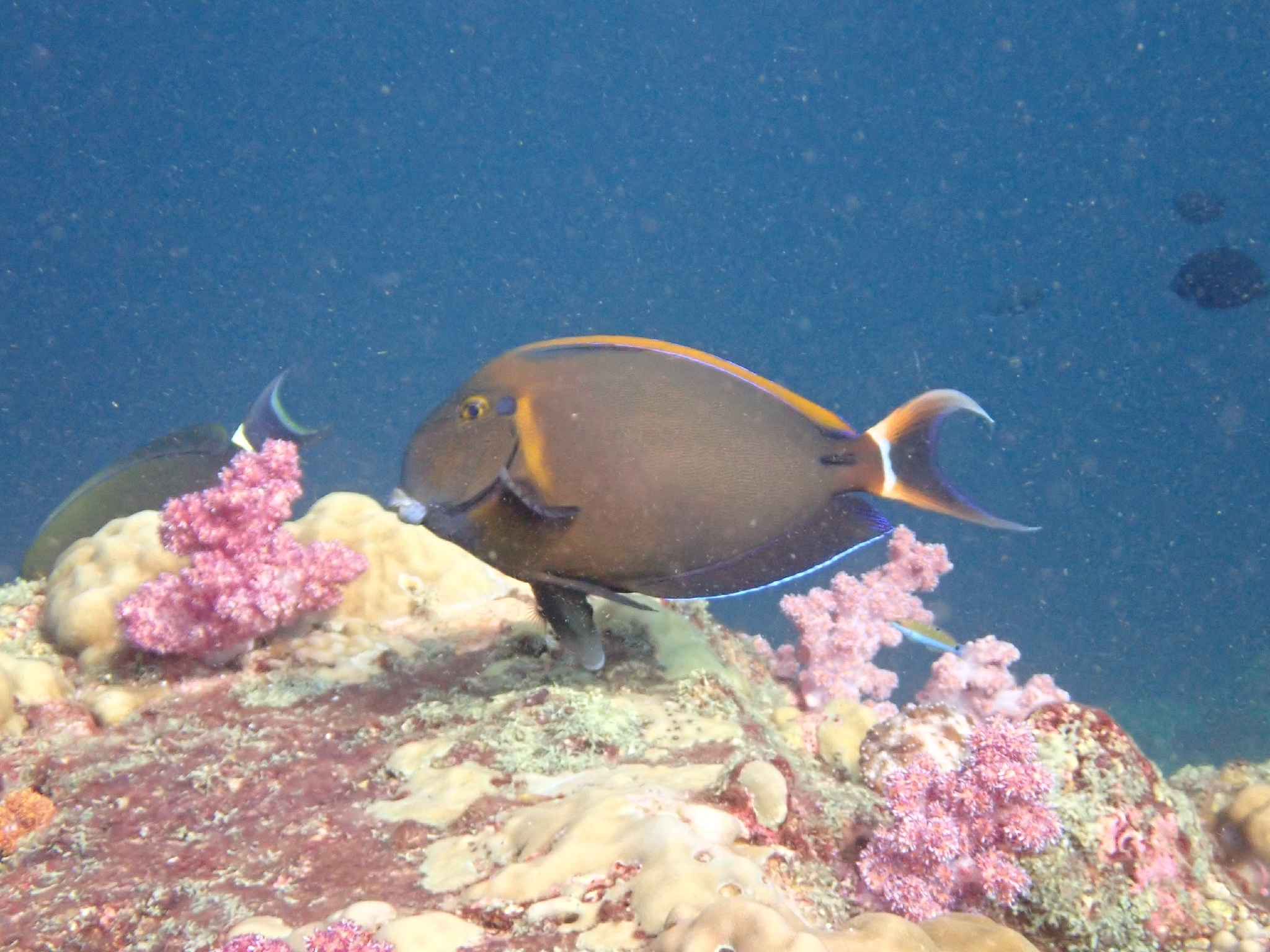
In Thailand

Acanthurus bariene has 9 spines and between 26 and 28 soft rays supporting the dorsal fin while the anal fin is supported by 3 spines and 25 or 26 soft rays. It has a deep body with its body being half its standard length and a convex dorsal profile to the head. The overall colour of the body is brown, gradually changing to yellowish-brown on the breast and belly, this is broken up by a large number of irregular horizontal greyish-blue lines. There is a black spot, similar in size to the eye, at upper end of gill opening, with a yellow bar running from the rear of the spot to under the pectoral fin. The dorsal fin is yellow with a thin blue line along its margin and base while the lobes of the lunate caudal fin are yellow. This species has a maximum published total length of 50 cm (20 in).

== Distribution and habitat ==
Acanthurus bariene is found in the Indian and Pacific Oceans from the Seychelles east to the Solomon Islands, south to Australia and north to the Ryukyu Islands. It is typically found in the outer slopes of coral reefs at depths greater than 30 m (98 ft).
