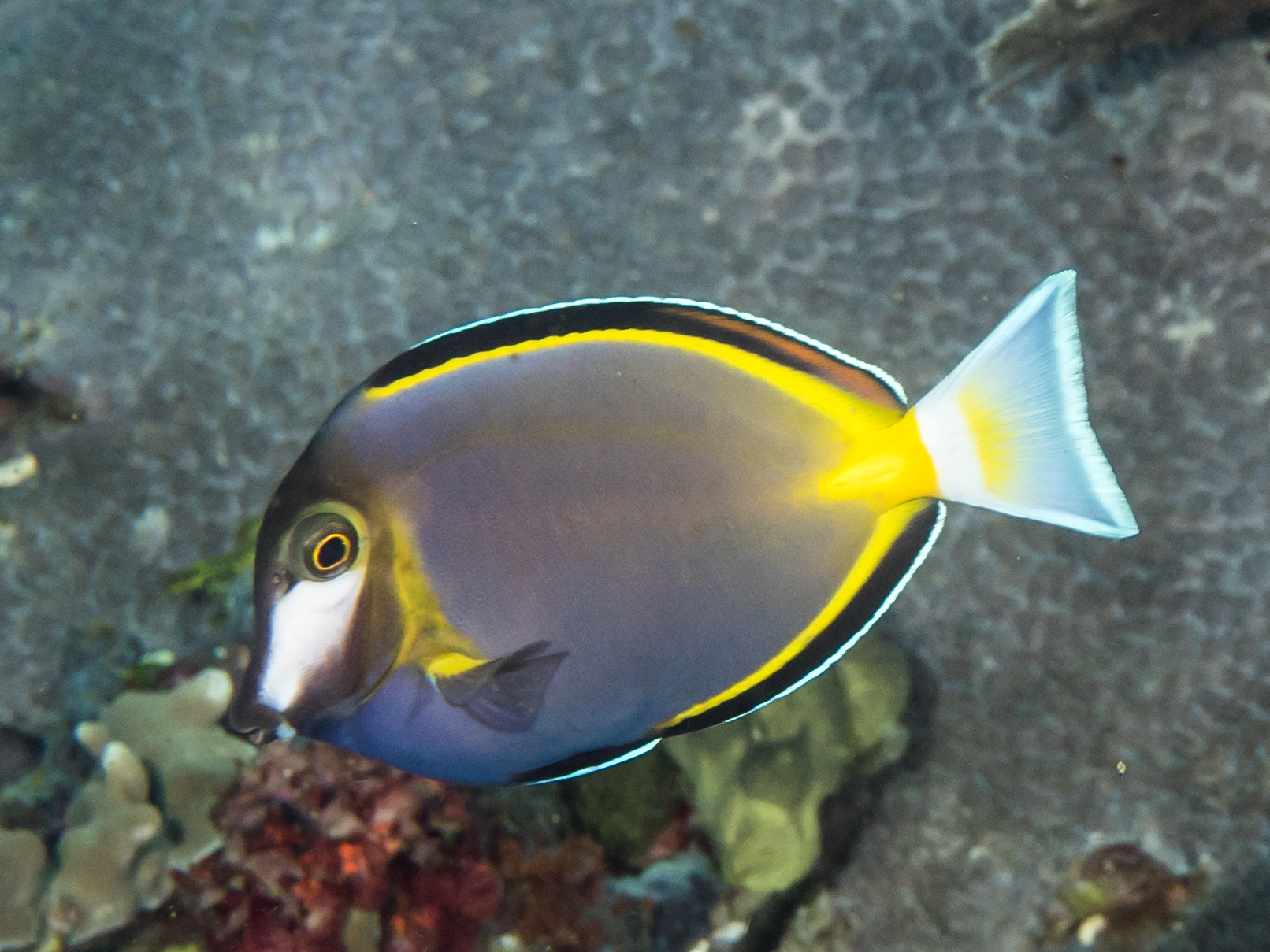

Conservation status
- Least Concern (IUCN 3.1)

Scientific classification
- Kingdom: Animalia
- Phylum: Chordata
- Class: Actinopterygii
- Order: Acanthuriformes
- Family: Acanthuridae
- Genus: Acanthurus
- Species: A. japonicus

Binomial name
- Acanthurus japonicus (Schmidt, 1931)

Synonyms
- Hepatus aliala japonicus Schmidt, 1931

= Acanthurus japonicus =

Species of fish

Acanthurus japonicus, the Japan surgeonfish, white-faced surgeonfish, gold rim tang, powder brown tang and white-nose surgeonfish, is a species of marine ray-finned fish belonging to the family Acanthuridae, the surgeonfishes, unicornfishes or tangs. This fish is found in the Western Pacific Ocean.

== Taxonomy ==
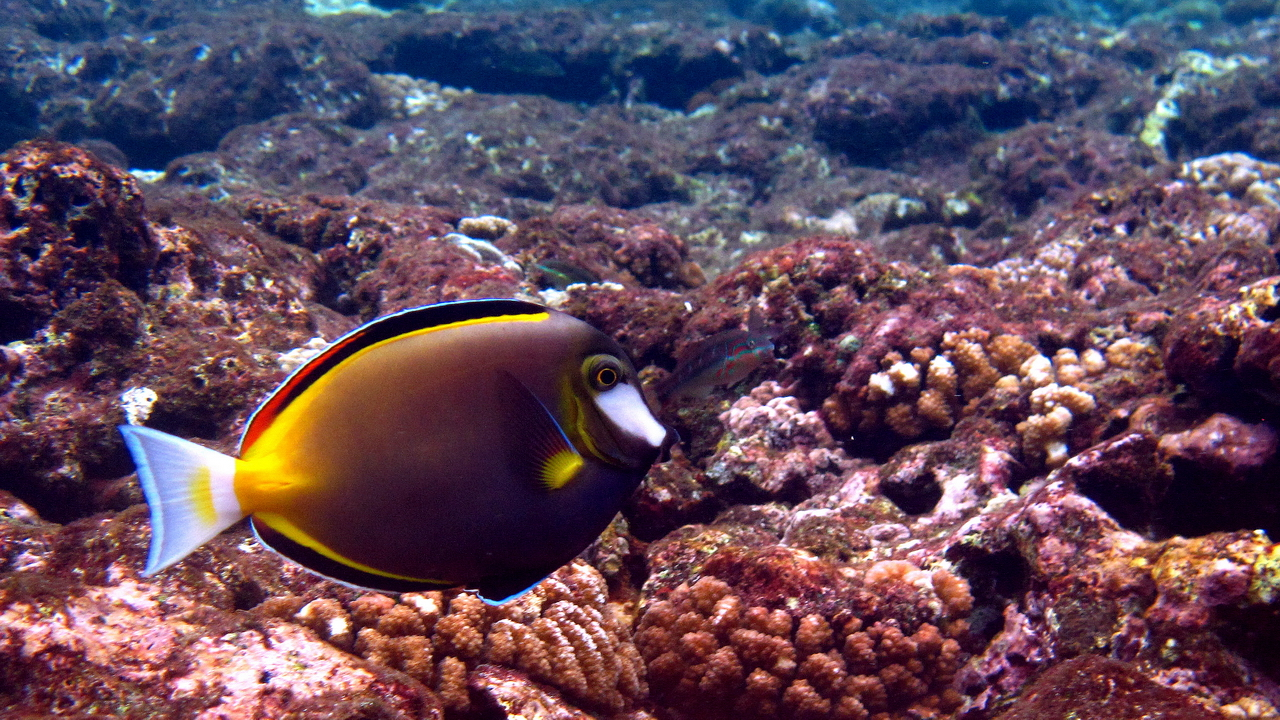
In Taiwan

Acanthurus japonicus was first formally described as Hepatus aliala japonicus in 1931 by the Soviet ichthyologist Peter Schmidt (zoologist) with its type locality given as Kominato on Amami-Oshima in the Ryukyu Islands of southern Japan.

The genus Acanthurus is one of two genera in the tribe Acanthurini which is one of three tribes in the subfamily Acanthurinae which is one of two subfamilies in the family Acanthuridae.

== Distribution and habitat ==
Acanthurus japonicus is found in the Western Pacific Ocean from southern Japan south to Sulawesi in Indonesia. This species occurs in small schools at depths between 1 and 20 m (3 ft 3 in and 65 ft 7 in) in clear water on lagoon and seaward reefs.

== Description ==
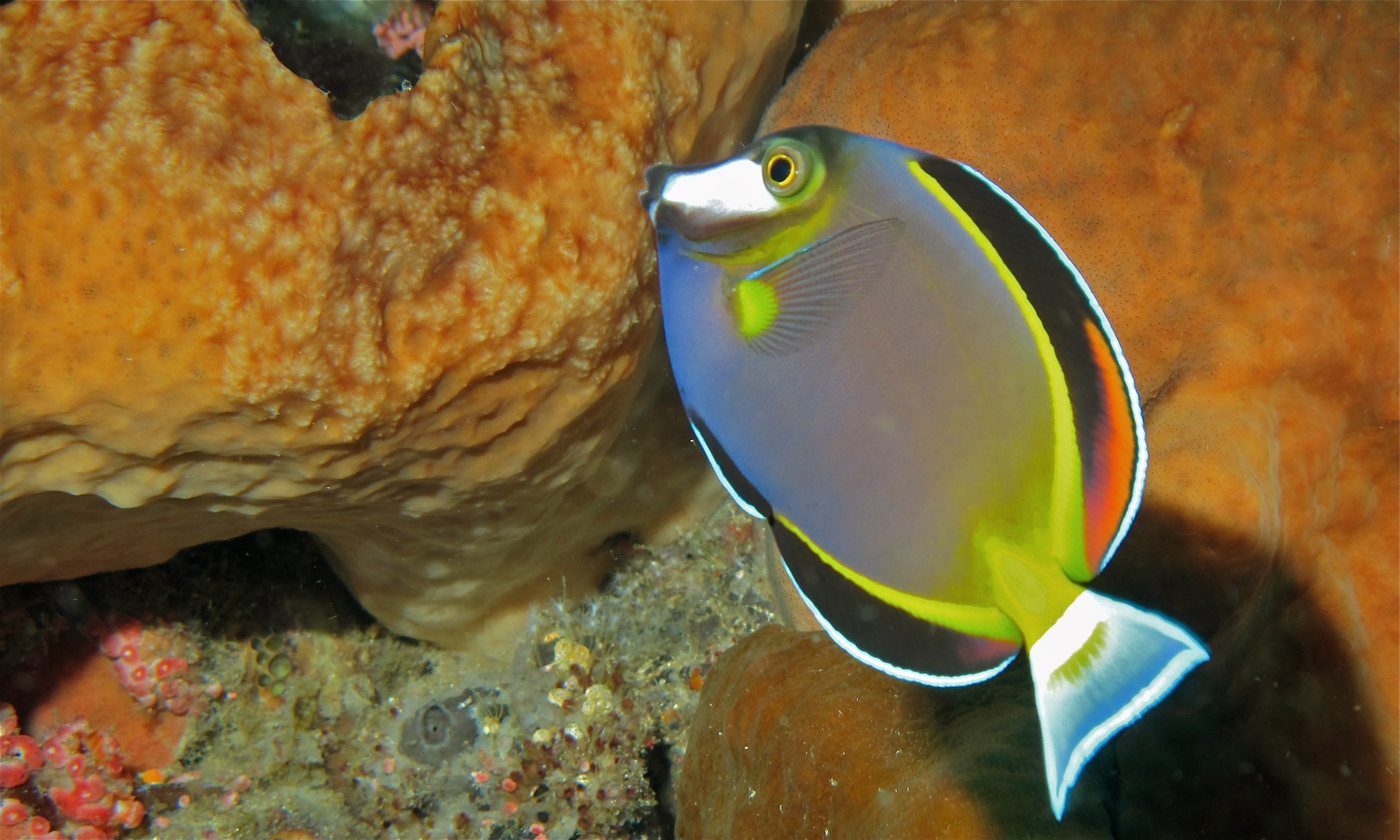
In Indonesia

Acanthurus japonicus has a laterally compressed oval body with long based dorsal and anal fins. 9 spines and between 28 and 31 soft rays support the dorsal fin while the anal fin is supported by 3 spines and between 26 and 29 soft rays.

The colour of this fish varies with the emotional state of the fish and may be brown, diffused with blue through to almost yellow but its most notable feature is a wide white band extending from the lower part of the orbit to the upper lip. There is a pink band along the soft-rayed part of the dorsal fin. The caudal peduncle is black with a yellow base. The caudal fin is truncate and the pectoral fins have yellow bases.

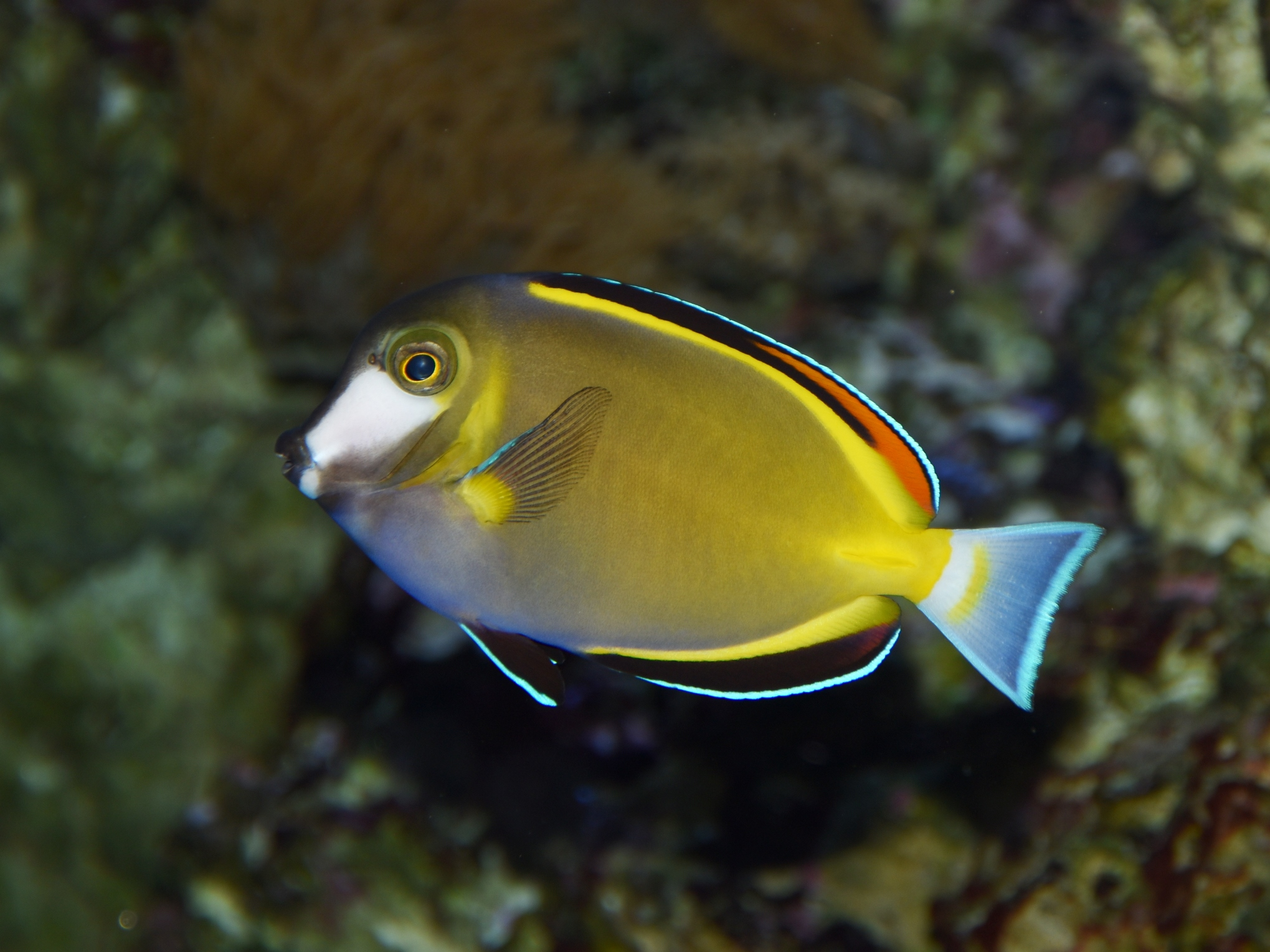
In captivity

This species has a maximum published total length 21 cm (8.3 in).
