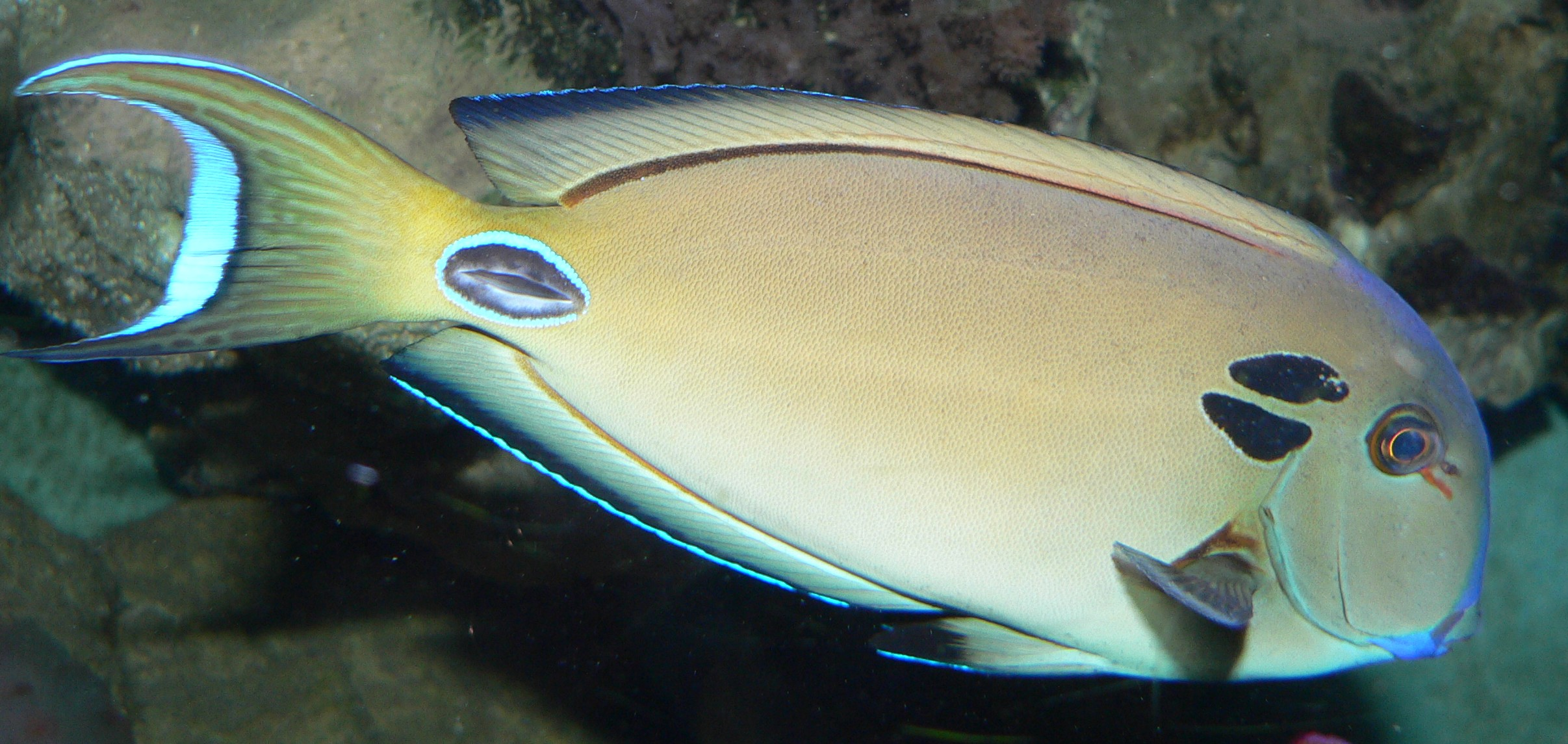

Conservation status
- Least Concern (IUCN 3.1)

Scientific classification
- Kingdom: Animalia
- Phylum: Chordata
- Class: Actinopterygii
- Order: Acanthuriformes
- Family: Acanthuridae
- Genus: Acanthurus
- Species: A. tennenti

Binomial name
- Acanthurus tennenti Günther, 1861

= Doubleband surgeonfish =

Species of ray-finned fish

The doubleband surgeonfish or lieutenant tang (Acanthurus tennenti) is a marine ray-finned fish in the family Acanthuridae. It is found in tropical and sub-tropical Indo-Pacific regions and can grow to be up to 50 cm (19.7") long.

== Physical Description ==
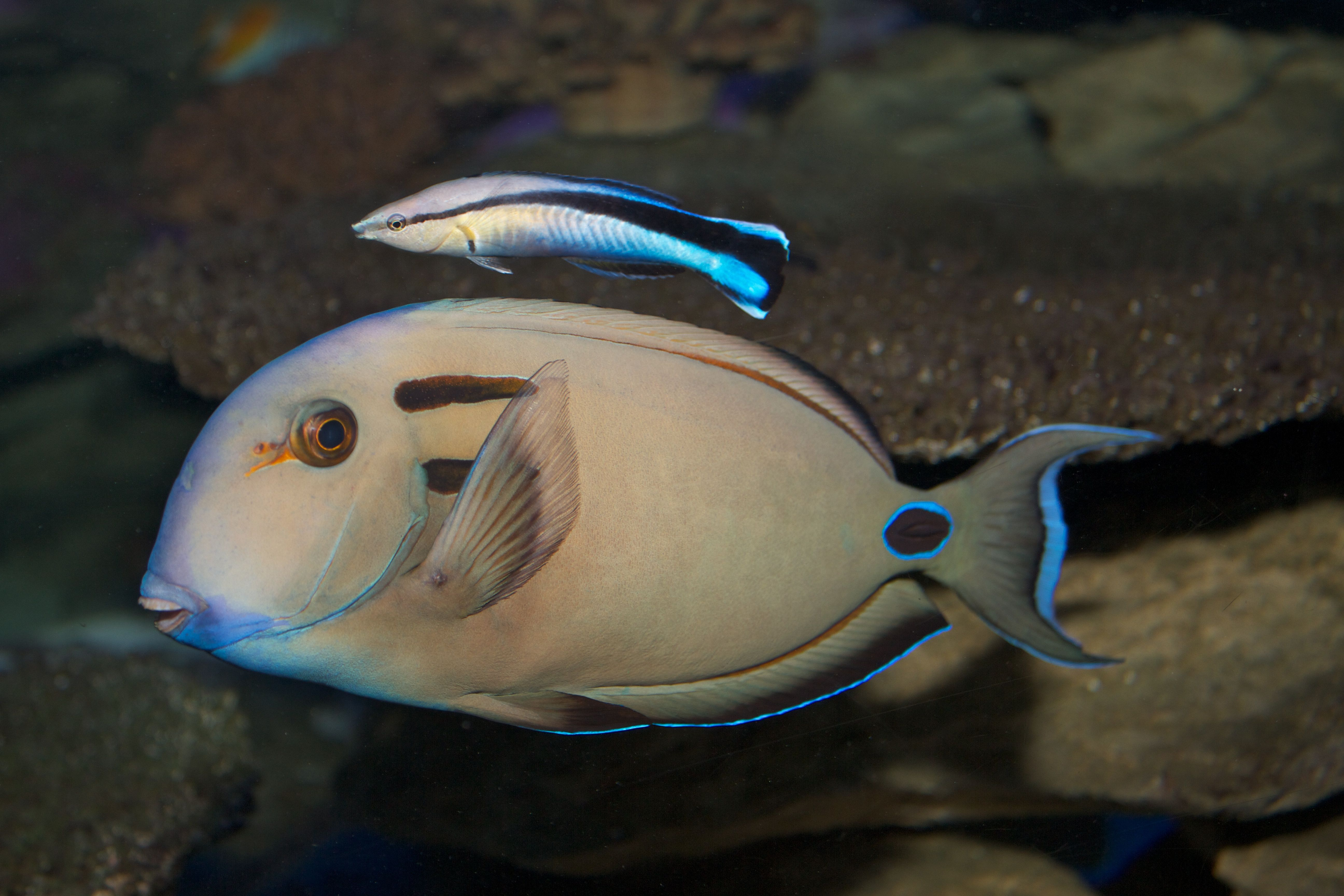
With a blue streak cleaner wrasse

The Doubleband Surgeonfish is a deep-bodied, laterally-compressed oval fish, with a body length over half its depth. It grows to an average length typically ranging between 25 cm (10 in) and 31 cm (12 in). Both male and female Doublebands are similar in appearance until they reach their breeding season, when the mature male takes on more vibrant hues or darker streaks to attract a mate. Coloration amongst the species can vary, ranging from orange-beige, olive-tan or steely grey, but can turn a dark-brown shade with hints of red or purple when stressed. A dark line runs along the base of the dorsal fin with a similar line at the base of the anal fin. There are two dark streaks behind the eye, with blackish scalpel-like scales that project from the caudal peduncle surrounded by a large black spot with a bluish border. Both dorsal and anal fins are long, extending out to the caudal peduncle. The caudal fin is crescent-shaped and continues to grow longer as the fish ages. It is rimmed by a band of bluish-white.

Habitat distribution around the Indian Ocean

== Distribution and habitat ==
This species has a wide range of distribution across the tropical and subtropical Indo-Pacific region, extending from East Africa and Madagascar to southeast Asia, Sri Lanka, Malaysia, Thailand and Indonesia. They mostly reside on rocks and coral reefs, on the reef slopes, and in the channels between reefs. They can be commonly found at depths between 1-40m (3-131ft) and prefer waters with temperatures between 25-29°C.

== Reproduction ==
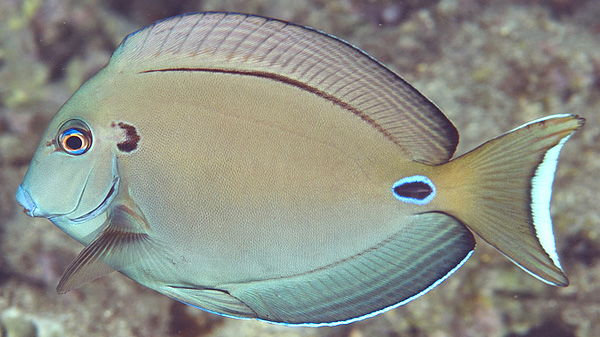
Subadult

Doublebands reproduce via external fertilization. Females will approach the reef surface and begin releasing their eggs, while the males follow their trail and release sperm as a response. Once the two gametes join and the egg is fertilized, the resulting larvae will float around for a certain period in the water column until they grow out of their planktonic stage. After approximately seven weeks, the larvae return to their reef habitat to settle in. The breeding season typically spans from July to August, with physical changes in preparation for this season beginning to occur cyclically around April.

== Ecology ==
The Doubleband Surgeonfish feeds on algae growing on the seabed and detritus, as well as the algal film that grows on sand and other substrates. The juveniles tend to join other fish species to form mixed species groups. At first they may be black, or yellow with a black horseshoe-shaped eye ring, but later they resemble the adult fish, apart from the black markings behind the eye. This fish feeds in the open during the day, often in small groups with parrotfish and other species.

== Status ==
This is a common fish in much of its range. It is sometimes caught for human consumption and commonly used in the aquarium trade. It is susceptible to the destruction of the reef habitats in which it lives, but is found in several marine protected areas. The International Union for Conservation of Nature has rated its conservation status as being of "least concern".
