= Lunate (microlith) =

Crescent or moon-shaped microlith

Lunate is a crescent or moon-shaped microlith. In the specialized terminology of lithic reduction, a lunate flake is a small, crescent-shaped flake removed from a stone tool during the process of pressure flaking.

In the Natufian period, a lunate was a small crescent-shaped stone tool that was sometimes used to harvest grasses.

In archaeology a lunate is a small stone artifact, that has a sharpened straight edge and a blunt crescent shaped back. The word originates from the Latin word lunatus which means to bend like a crescent, and from luna meaning moon in Latin.

A lunate object can be typically used as a decorative piece or as a stone tool.

== Israeli lunate ==
In the earlier findings of Epipaleolithic lunate in the Natufian, Harifian, and Negev Kebaran periods in Israel, they were roughly 10–40 mm long and were formed on small blades or bladelets. While the later findings Natufian and Harifian range of lengths varied then between 9 mm and 17 mm. In the later period, the lunate resulted in three specific types:

- Helwan Backing (Bifacial)
- Plain Abrupt Backing
- Bipolar Backing (anvil)

The differences among these three types are also associated with the length of the lunate objects, with Helwan lunate normally being the longest and bipolar being the shortest. For unknown reasons, the epipaleolithic lunate tool type disappeared and did not reappear until around the end of the 4th millennium B.C.

These Lunate tools were most likely used as barbs in arrow shafts, or as transverse arrowheads coated with poison. The Lunate are also a very rare artifact from the Early Bronze Age because there was not as much emphasis on hunting during that period. The reappearance of Lunate after several millennia could shed some light on the hunting emphasis in the society.

Lunate have been found as far north as the Azor tombs in Israel and was far south as south Sinai in this particular region.

== Other cultural examples ==
Lunate artefacts have been discovered among early Māori stone carving in New Zealand. The original lunate pendant found in New Zealand appears to be of clear transparent pounamu (greenstone), from Ruapuke Island, in Foveaux Strait. Its characteristics include a notched edge and the stone itself is thought to originate from Tangiwai, New Zealand. There was a second rare lunate-shaped object discovered in the New Zealand ethnological region as well. A handful of ancient societies shaped their tools in the form of lunate such as the Puebloan peoples who originated around San Juan County, Utah. There have also been findings of lunate used by Puebloan peoples dating back to the 3rd/4th millennium B.C.
