= Randalli =

Randalli may refer to:

- Alpheus randalli
- Valenciennea randalli
- Myripristis randalli
- Ptereleotris randalli
- Synodus randalli
- Nemipterus randalli
- Brimus randalli
- Amblyeleotris randalli
- Acanthurus randalli
- Cirripectes randalli
- Maculabatis randalli
- Gordiichthys randalli
- Gymnothorax randalli
- Antennarius randalli
- Heteronyx randalli
- Chlidichthys randalli
- Assessor randalli
- Bryx randalli
- Plectroglyphidodon randalli
- Enneapterygius randalli
- Plectroglyphidodon randalli
- Cybocephalus randalli
- Parapercis randalli
- Emblemariopsis randalli
- Torquigener randalli
- Ecsenius randalli
- Callechelys randalli
- Synchiropus randalli
- Paragaleus randalli
- Scarus randalli
- Ematops randalli
- Bathycongrus randalli
- Helcogramma randalli
- Siganus randalli
