= Ocean surgeon =

Ocean surgeon may refer to:

- Acanthurus bahianus, a fish found off the coast of Brazil.
- Acanthurus tractus, a fish found in the western Atlantic Ocean, Florida, the Bahamas, the Caribbean Sea and the Gulf of Mexico.
