= Cybocephalus nigritulus =

Scientific classification
- Domain: Eukaryota
- Kingdom: Animalia
- Phylum: Arthropoda
- Class: Insecta
- Order: Coleoptera
- Suborder: Polyphaga
- Infraorder: Cucujiformia
- Family: Cybocephalidae
- Genus: Cybocephalus
- Species: C. nigritulus

Binomial name
- Cybocephalus nigritulus LeConte, 1863

Species of beetle

Cybocephalus nigritulus is a species of sap, bark and fungus beetles in the family Cybocephalidae. It is found in North America. It can grow to be 1.0 mm to 1.55 mm in size.
