= Cybocephalus nipponicus =

Scientific classification
- Domain: Eukaryota
- Kingdom: Animalia
- Phylum: Arthropoda
- Class: Insecta
- Order: Coleoptera
- Suborder: Polyphaga
- Infraorder: Cucujiformia
- Family: Cybocephalidae
- Genus: Cybocephalus
- Species: C. nipponicus

Binomial name
- Cybocephalus nipponicus Endrödy-Younga, 1971

Species of beetle

Cybocephalus nipponicus is a species of beetle in the family Cybocephalidae. It is found in Africa, the Caribbean, Europe and Northern Asia (excluding China), North America, Oceania, and Southern Asia. It can grow to be 1 mm to 1.35 mm in size.
