= Cybocephalus californicus =

Scientific classification
- Kingdom: Animalia
- Phylum: Arthropoda
- Clade: Pancrustacea
- Class: Insecta
- Order: Coleoptera
- Suborder: Polyphaga
- Infraorder: Cucujiformia
- Family: Cybocephalidae
- Genus: Cybocephalus
- Species: C. californicus

Binomial name
- Cybocephalus californicus Horn, 1879

Species of beetle

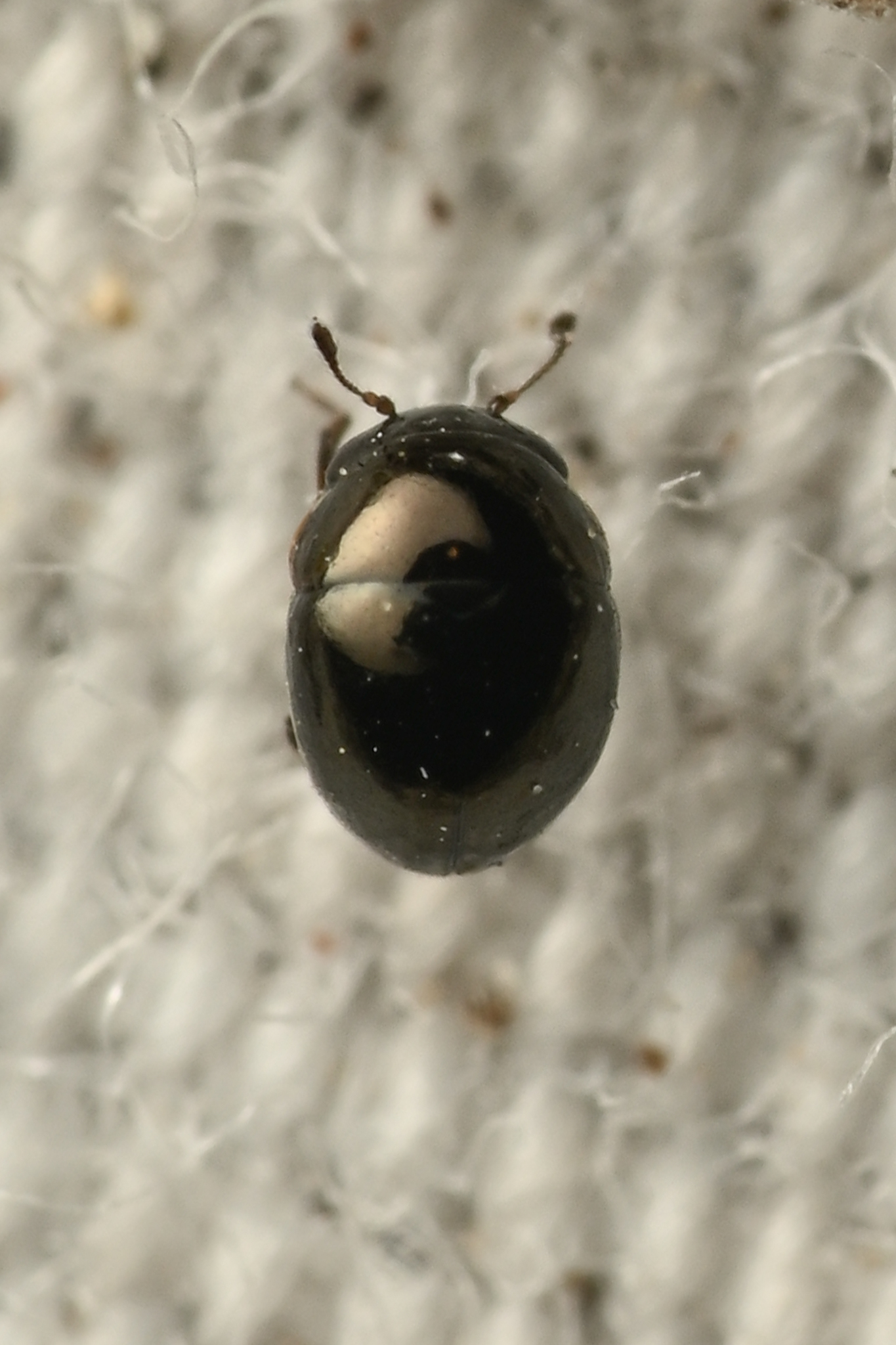
Cybocephalus californicus in the United States

Cybocephalus californicus is a species of beetle in the family Cybocephalidae. It is found in North America. It can grow to be 0.95 mm to 1.30 mm in size.
