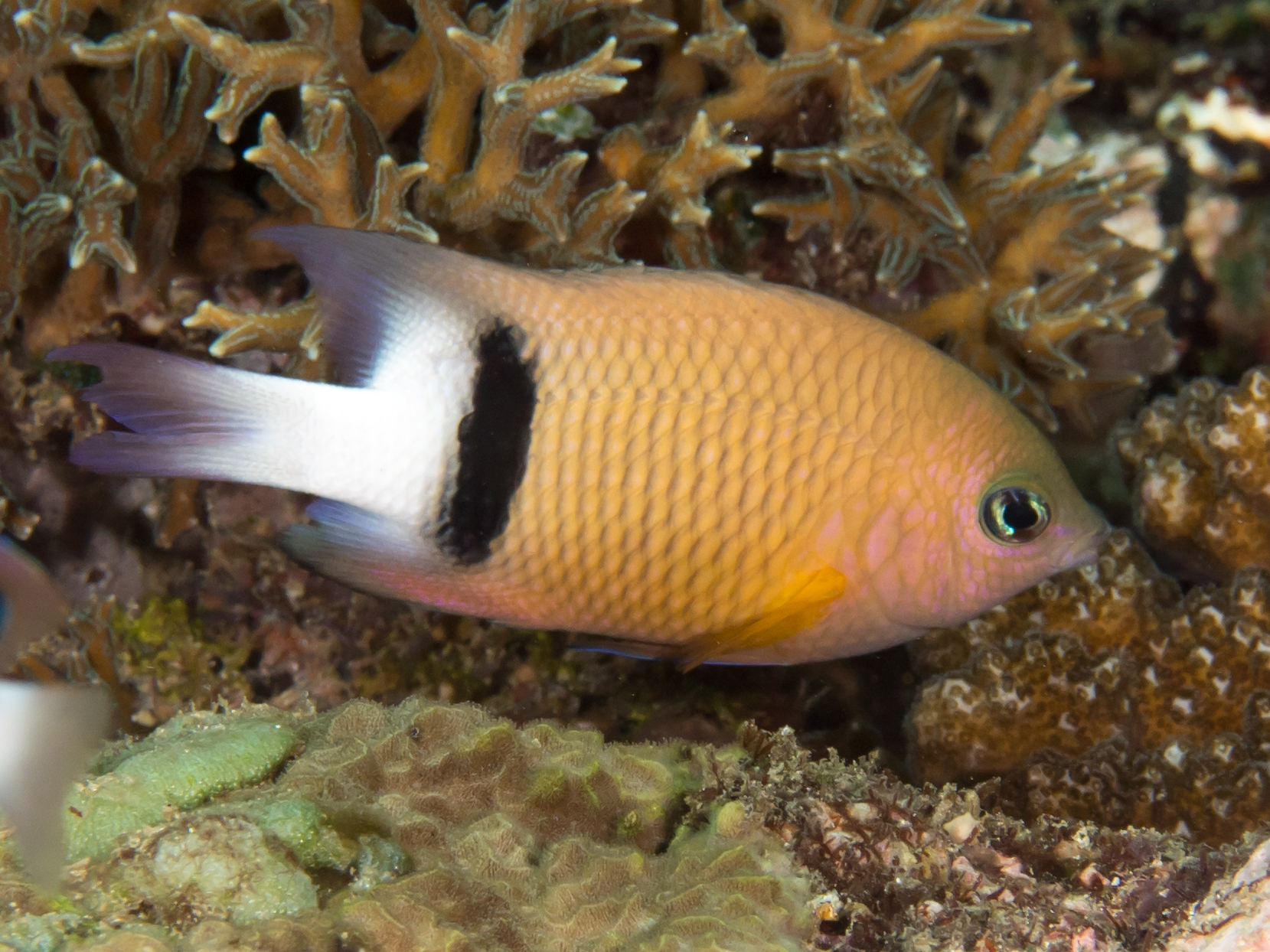
- With white tail, in Indonesia
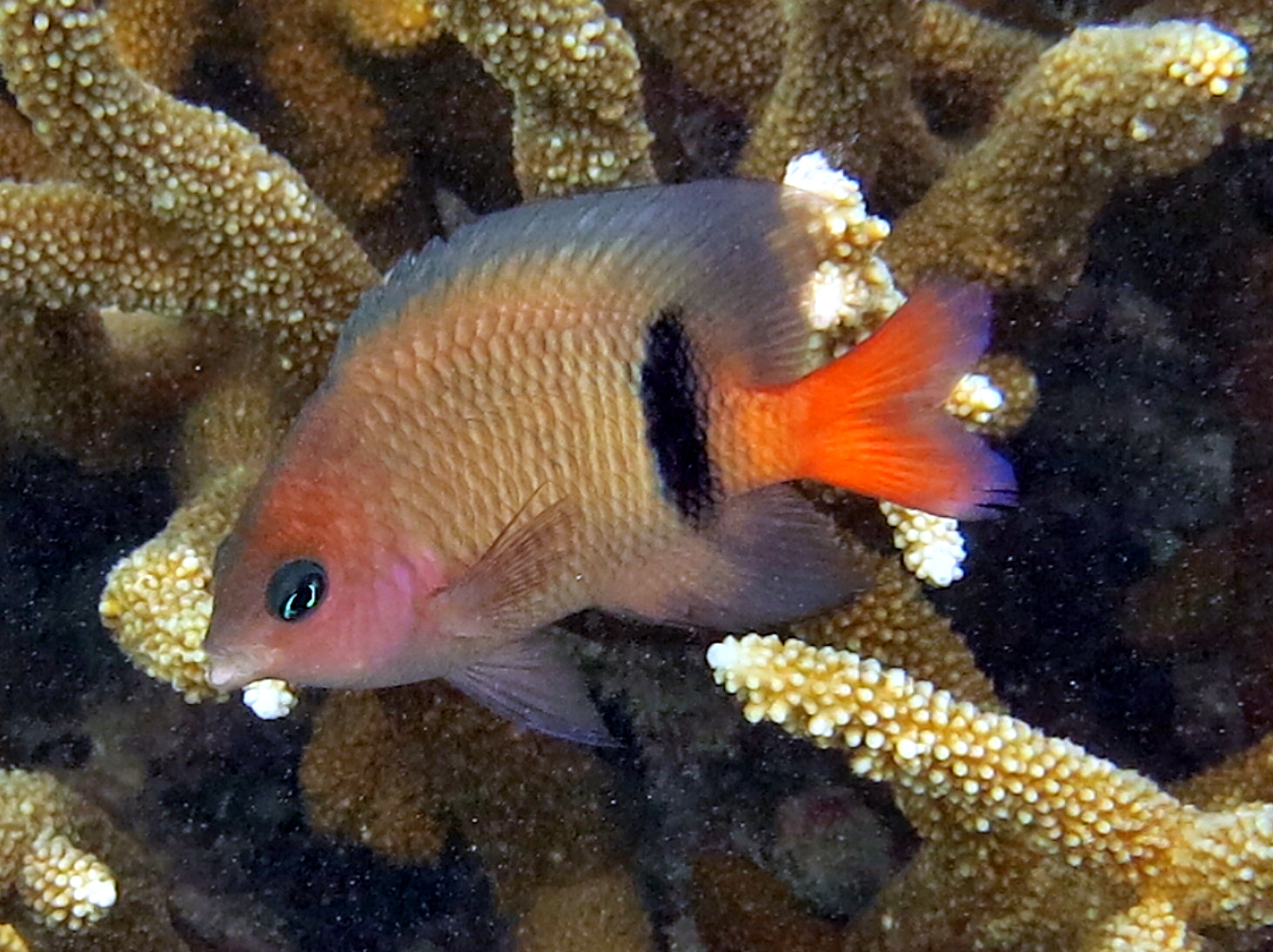
- With orange tail, in the Maldives

Conservation status
- Near Threatened (IUCN 3.1)

Scientific classification
- Kingdom: Animalia
- Phylum: Chordata
- Class: Actinopterygii
- Order: Blenniiformes
- Family: Pomacentridae
- Genus: Plectroglyphidodon
- Species: P. dickii

Binomial name
- Plectroglyphidodon dickii (Liénard, 1839)

Synonyms
- List: Glyphidodon unifasciatus Kner & Steindachner, 1867; Paraglyphidodon dickii (Liénard, 1839); Plectoglyphidodon dickii (Liénard, 1839); Abudefduf dicki (Liénard, 1839); Plectroglypidodon dickii (Liénard, 1839); Plectrogliphidodon dickii ^{(Liénard, 1839)}; Abudefduf dickii (Liénard, 1839); Glyphisodon dickii Liénard, 1839

= Plectroglyphidodon dickii =

Species of fish

Plectroglyphidodon dickii, common name blackbar devil, Dick's damsel or narrowbar damselfish, is a species of damselfish in the family Pomacentridae. This species was formerly classified as Dascyllus aruanus, but recently the populations of western Indian Ocean and Pacific Ocean have been split off.

== Etymology ==
The genus epithet Plectroglyphidodon derives from the Greek words plektron (meaning = anything to strike with, spur), plus the suffixes glyphis (mening carved) and odous (meaning teeth).

== Distribution ==
This species is present in the Indo-Pacific, from East Africa to the Line Islands and Tuamotu, north to Japan, south to Australia and east to French Polynesia.

== Habitat ==
These tropical marine reef-associated damselfishes occur in shallow coral reefs, especially with branching corals, in areas of high wave action, in clear waters lagoons and seaward reefs, at depths of 1 to 15 m. They are commonly present with Pocillopora or Acropora corals.

== Description ==
Plectroglyphidodon dickii can reach a body length of about 9–11 cm (3.5–4.3 in). These damselfishes have a compact and stocky body, with 12 dorsal spines, 16-18 dorsal soft rays, 2 anal spines and 14-16 anal soft rays. The background coloring is mainly light brown with very visible scales and a small vertical black bar crossing the rear of the body, just ahead of the caudal area. The eyes show light blue rings and light purple markings. The dorsal, pectoral and pelvic fins are yellow orange or light brown, while the caudal fin is white, more rarely orange, with a transparent blue shaded fringe on the rear. The operculum sometimes shows a purplish tinge. Also the caudal peduncle can be white or orange.

== Biology ==
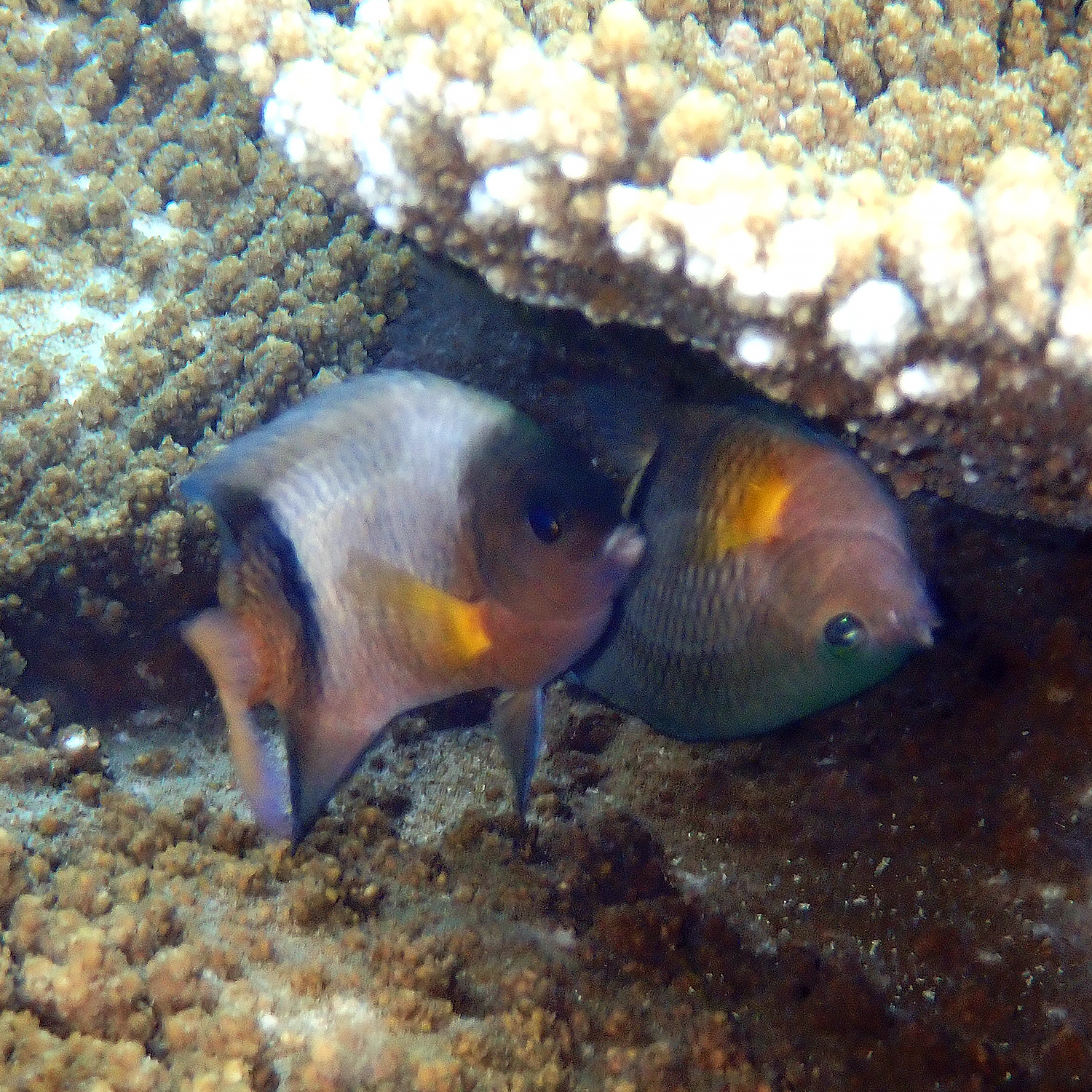
P. dickii spawning, at Norfolk Island

These damselfishes usually live in groups, but they are often encountered as solitary and highly territorial individuals. They commonly feed on filamentous algae, benthic small invertebrates and sometimes on small fishes.

They are oviparous. Eggs are demersal and adhere to the substrate, always protected and aerated by the male.

== Bibliography ==
- Allen, G.R. 1975. Damselfishes of the South Seas. TFH Publications. Pp. 237.
- Allen, G.R. 1991. Damselfishes of the World. Mergus. Pp. 271.
- Allen, G.R. 1997. Marine Fishes of Tropical Australia and South-east Asia. Western Australian Museum. Pp. 220.
- Baissac, J. de B. (1990) SWIOP/WP/54 - Checklist of the marine fishes of Mauritius., RAF/87/008/WP/54/90 Regional Project for the Development & Management of Fisheries in the Southwest Indian Ocean
- Hiatt, R.W. and D.W. Strasburg (1960) Ecological relationships of the fish fauna on coral reefs of the Marshall Islands., Ecol. Monogr. 30(1):65-127.
- Myers, R.F. 1999. Micronesian Reef Fishes. Coral Graphics. Pp. 330.
- Randall, J.E., Allen, G.R. & R.C. Steene. 1997. Fishes of the Great Barrier Reef and Coral Sea. Crawford House Press. Pp. 251.
- Rau, N. and A. Rau (1980) Commercial marine fishes of the Central Philippines (bony fish)., German Agency for Technical Cooperation, Germany. 623 pp.
