= Plectroglyphidodon sagmarius =

Scientific classification
- Kingdom: Animalia
- Phylum: Chordata
- Class: Actinopterygii
- Order: Blenniiformes
- Family: Pomacentridae
- Genus: Plectroglyphidodon
- Species: P. sagmarius

Binomial name
- Plectroglyphidodon sagmarius Randall & Earle, 1999

Species of fish

Plectroglyphidodon sagmarius is a species of Perciformes in family Pomacentridae.
