= Cybocephalus randalli =

Scientific classification
- Domain: Eukaryota
- Kingdom: Animalia
- Phylum: Arthropoda
- Class: Insecta
- Order: Coleoptera
- Suborder: Polyphaga
- Infraorder: Cucujiformia
- Family: Cybocephalidae
- Genus: Cybocephalus
- Species: C. randalli

Binomial name
- Cybocephalus randalli Smith in Smith & Cave, 2006

Species of beetle

Cybocephalus randalli is a species of beetle in the family Cybocephalidae. It is found in North America.
