= Plectroglyphidodon flaviventris =

Scientific classification
- Kingdom: Animalia
- Phylum: Chordata
- Class: Actinopterygii
- Order: Blenniiformes
- Family: Pomacentridae
- Genus: Plectroglyphidodon
- Species: P. flaviventris

Binomial name
- Plectroglyphidodon flaviventris Allen & Randall, 1974

Species of fish

Plectroglyphidodon flaviventris is a species of Perciformes in the family Pomacentridae.
