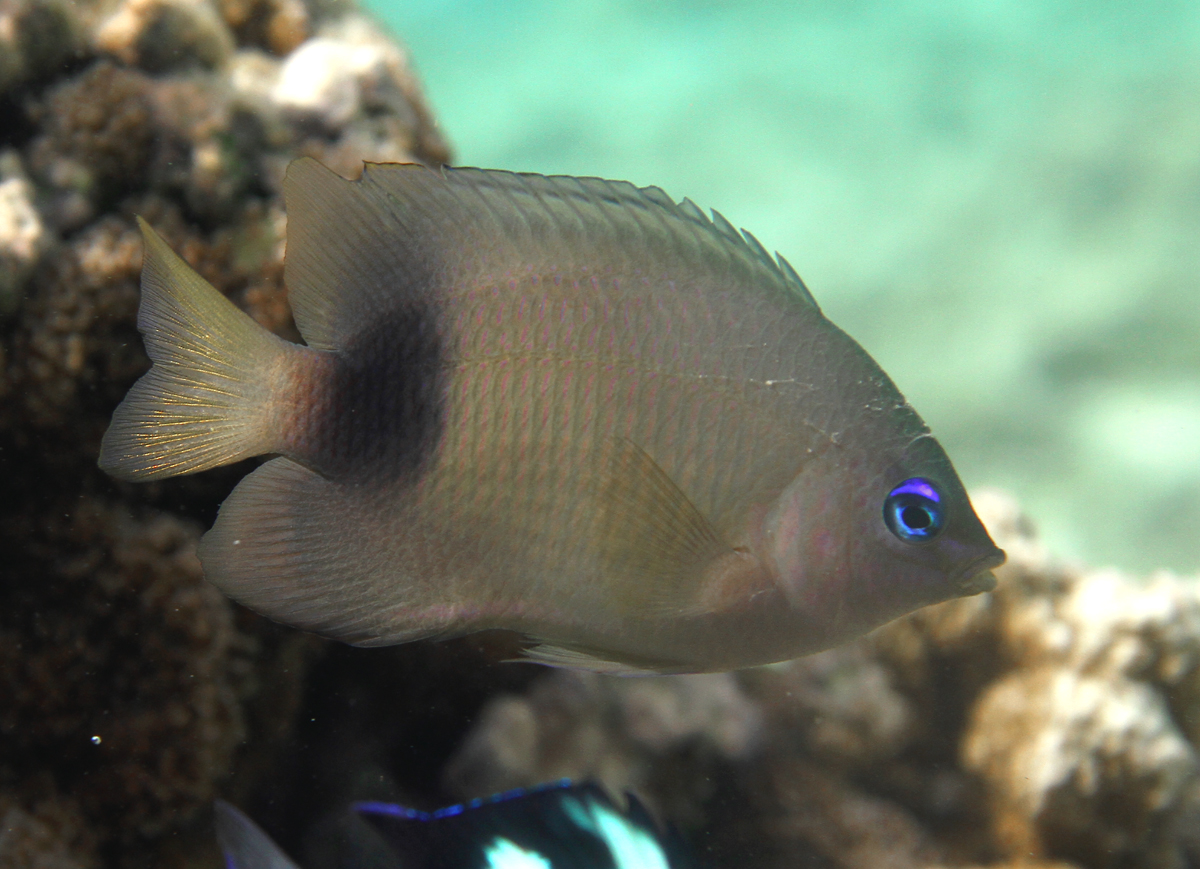

Conservation status
- Least Concern (IUCN 3.1)

Scientific classification
- Kingdom: Animalia
- Phylum: Chordata
- Class: Actinopterygii
- Order: Blenniiformes
- Family: Pomacentridae
- Genus: Plectroglyphidodon
- Species: P. johnstonianus

Binomial name
- Plectroglyphidodon johnstonianus Fowler & Ball, 1924

Synonyms
- Plectroglyphidodon nitidus J. L. B. Smith, 1956

= Plectroglyphidodon johnstonianus =

Species of fish

Plectroglyphidodon johnstonianus, commonly known as the Johnstone Island damselfish, is a species of damselfish from the Indo-Pacific. It occasionally makes its way into the aquarium trade. It grows to a size of 14 cm in length.
