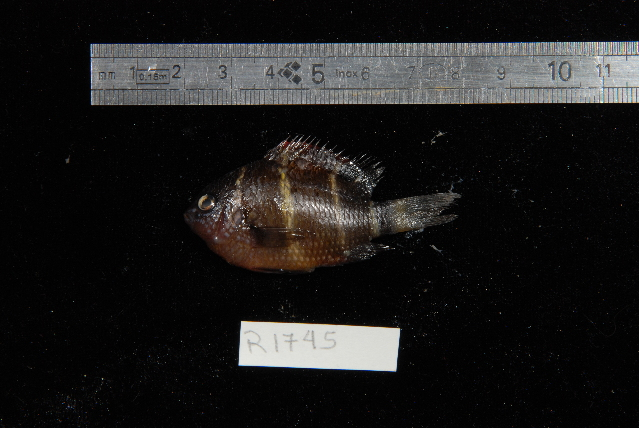

Conservation status
- Least Concern (IUCN 3.1)

Scientific classification
- Kingdom: Animalia
- Phylum: Chordata
- Class: Actinopterygii
- Order: Blenniiformes
- Family: Pomacentridae
- Genus: Plectroglyphidodon
- Species: P. phoenixensis

Binomial name
- Plectroglyphidodon phoenixensis (Schultz, 1943)

Synonyms
- Abudefduf phoenixensis Schultz, 1943

= Plectroglyphidodon phoenixensis =

Species of Actinopterygii

Plectroglyphidodon phoenixensis, also known as the phoenix damsel, is a species of Perciformes in the family Pomacentridae.

== Description ==
They have a total of 12 dorsal spines, 16-17 dorsal soft rays, 2 anal spines, and 13-14 anal soft rays. They grow to a maximum length of 9 centimetres (3.5 in).

== Distribution ==
The phoenix damsel is found in the Indo-Pacific region from East Africa through Marquesas Islands, Society Islands and Tuamotus, and north to Ryukyu Islands.

== Habitat and biology ==
The phoenix damsel is found in the surge zone of seaward reef margins, and generally occurs in or near Acropora or Pocillopora coral patches between 1 and 8 m (3.3 and 26.2 ft) depth. They are demersal; i.e. they occupy the sea floors. They are solitary and territorial. They are herbivores and live off benthic algae. Phoenix damsels are oviparous. They lay eggs which are demersal and adhere to the substrate, and the male guards and aerates them.

== Conservation ==
Their status on the IUCN Red List of Threatened Species is considered Least Concern as of 2025. They appear to be fairly rare in their native range, however. The only known threat to the species is their use in the aquarium trade, but this is not considered a significant one.
