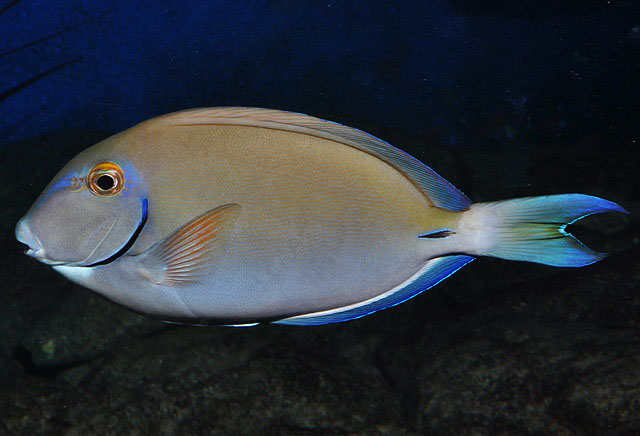

Conservation status
- Least Concern (IUCN 3.1)

Scientific classification
- Kingdom: Animalia
- Phylum: Chordata
- Class: Actinopterygii
- Order: Acanthuriformes
- Family: Acanthuridae
- Genus: Acanthurus
- Species: A. tractus

Binomial name
- Acanthurus tractus F. Poey, 1860
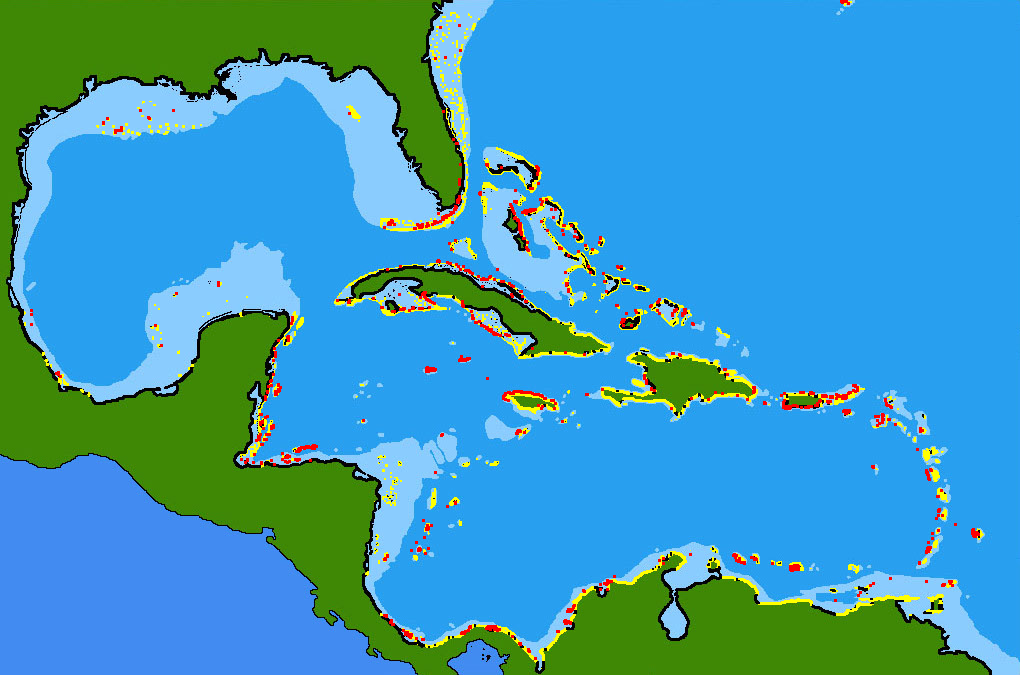
- Acanthurus tractus range

Synonyms
- Acronurus nigriculus Poey, 1875; Teuthis tractus (Poey, 1860)

= Acanthurus tractus =

Species of fish

Acanthurus tractus, the five-band surgeonfish, ocean surgeon, or ocean surgeonfish, is a species of ray-finned fish in the family Acanthuridae found in the western Atlantic Ocean, Florida, the Bahamas, the Caribbean Sea and the Gulf of Mexico. Until recently, it was considered a synonym of Acanthurus bahianus, but its status as a separate species was resurrected in 2011.

== Taxonomy ==
Acanthurus tractus was first formally described in 1860 by the Cuban zoologist Felipe Poey with its type locality given as Cuba.

This taxon was considered to be a synonym of A. bahianus. In 2011 it was shown that the populations in the North Atlantic differ morphologically and genetically from the South Atlantic populations and the northern Atlantic population is now recognised as a valid and distinct species.

== Etymology ==
Acanthurus tractus was given the specific name tractus which means "streak", Poey did not explain what this alluded to but it may refer to the sinuous, yellow horizontal lines on the body.

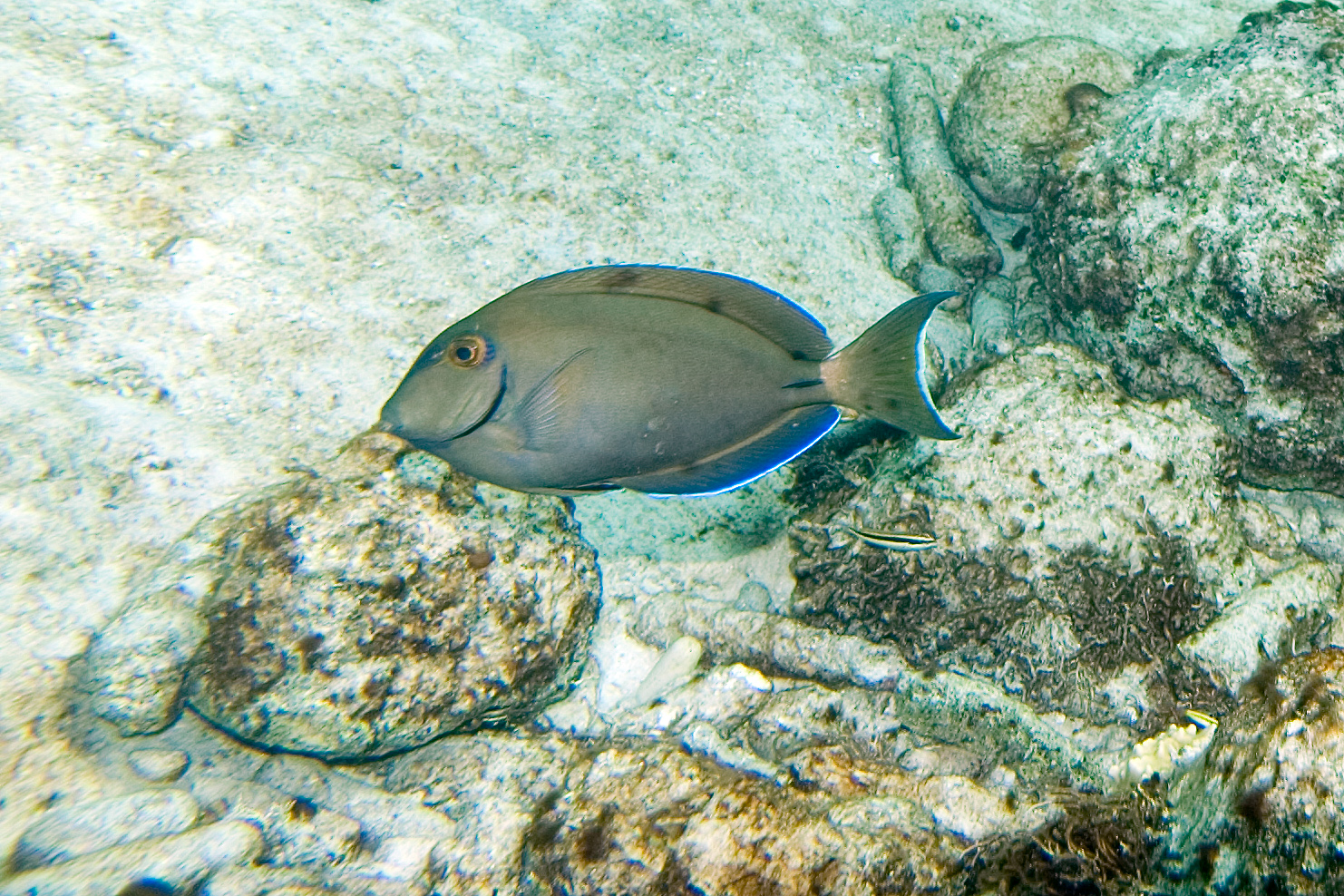
In Bonaire

== Description ==
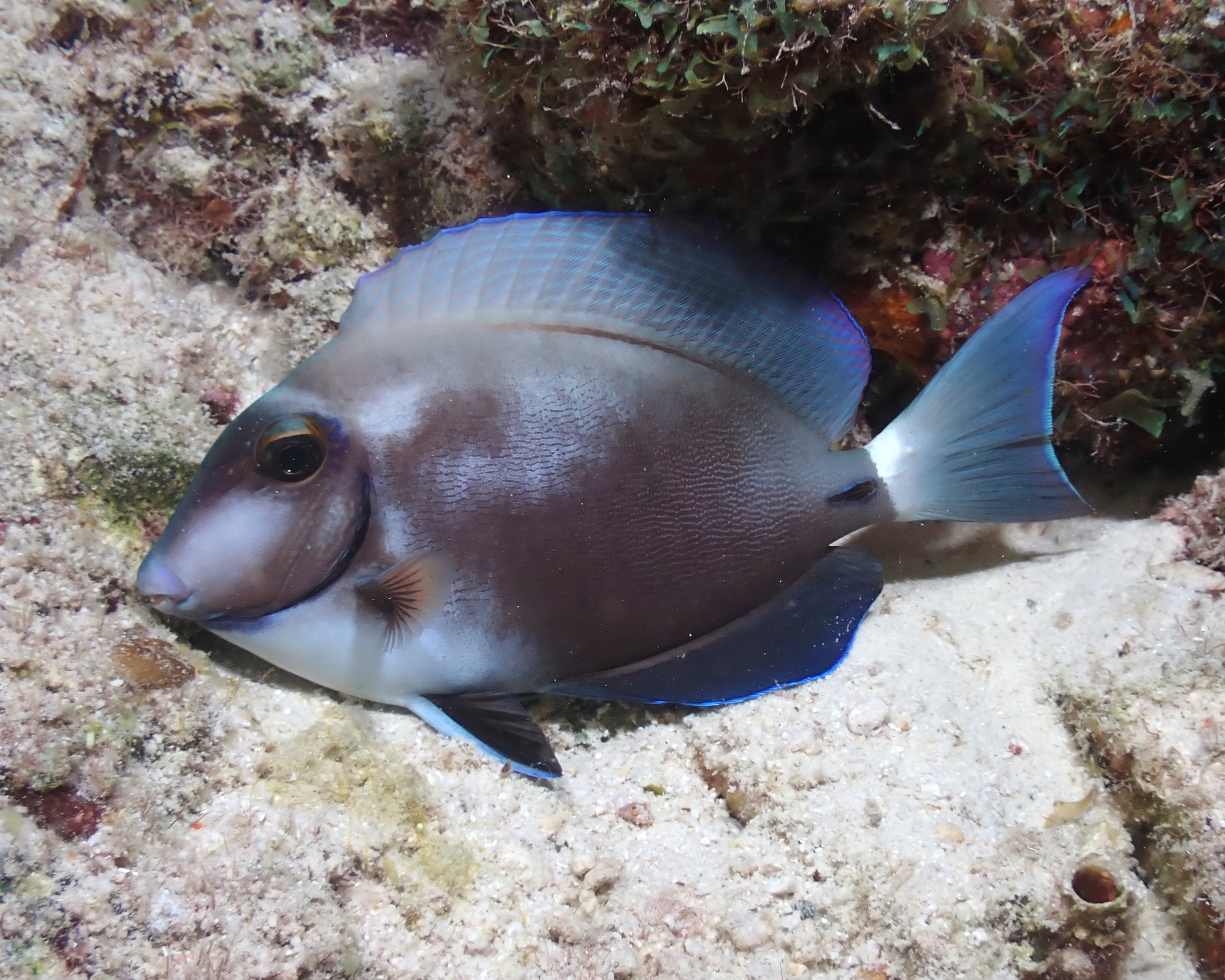
Nocturnal colouration, in Bonaire

Acanthurus tractus grows to a length of about 38 cm (15 in), although 25 cm (10 in) is a more typical size. It is a deep-bodied, laterally-compressed oval fish with a steep head profile and large eyes high on the sides of the head. The mouth is small and has protrusible lips. The elongated dorsal fin has nine spines and 23 to 26 soft rays. The elongated anal fin has three spines and 21 to 23 soft rays. The caudal peduncle bears a single depressible spine on either side, and the caudal fin has a concave edge with pointed tips. The colour is somewhat variable, being light beige over sandy substrates and darker brown over rocks. The flanks are sometimes bluish-green, with almost invisible fine vertical striping. Short blue lines radiate from the eye, and the dorsal, anal and caudal fins are edged with blue. The rays of the pectoral fins are often orange, and there is frequently a pale or white ring around the caudal peduncle.

This species could be confused with Acanthurus chirurgus, but that species has about eleven dark vertical stripes on its flanks and its fins are more conspicuously blue. In the Gulf of Mexico, it could be confused with Acanthurus randalli, but that species is rather smaller and has yellower fins. Another similar species is Acanthurus bahianus, but that species has a yellow rather than a blue margin to the dorsal and caudal fins.

== Distribution and habitat ==
Acanthurus tractus is native to the shallow sub-tidal areas of the western Atlantic Ocean, the Caribbean Sea and parts of the Gulf of Mexico. Its range extends from North Carolina to the Bahamas, Bermuda, Florida and Tuxpan, Mexico, including the Caribbean Sea and the Flower Garden Banks National Marine Sanctuary in the Gulf of Mexico. It is typically found on rocky and coral reefs at depths down to about 56 m (184 ft), but also inhabits rocky shores with patches of sand, and seagrass meadows.

== Ecology ==
Acanthurus tractus is diurnal. It feeds by grazing on the algal film that grows on coral and rock substrates. It swallows sand as it feeds, and this is retained in the thin-walled stomach which acts as a gizzard. This fish grows faster than many other species in the genus, and researchers have found that the fish's longevity depends on the temperature of the water rather than the size of the fish.

== Status ==
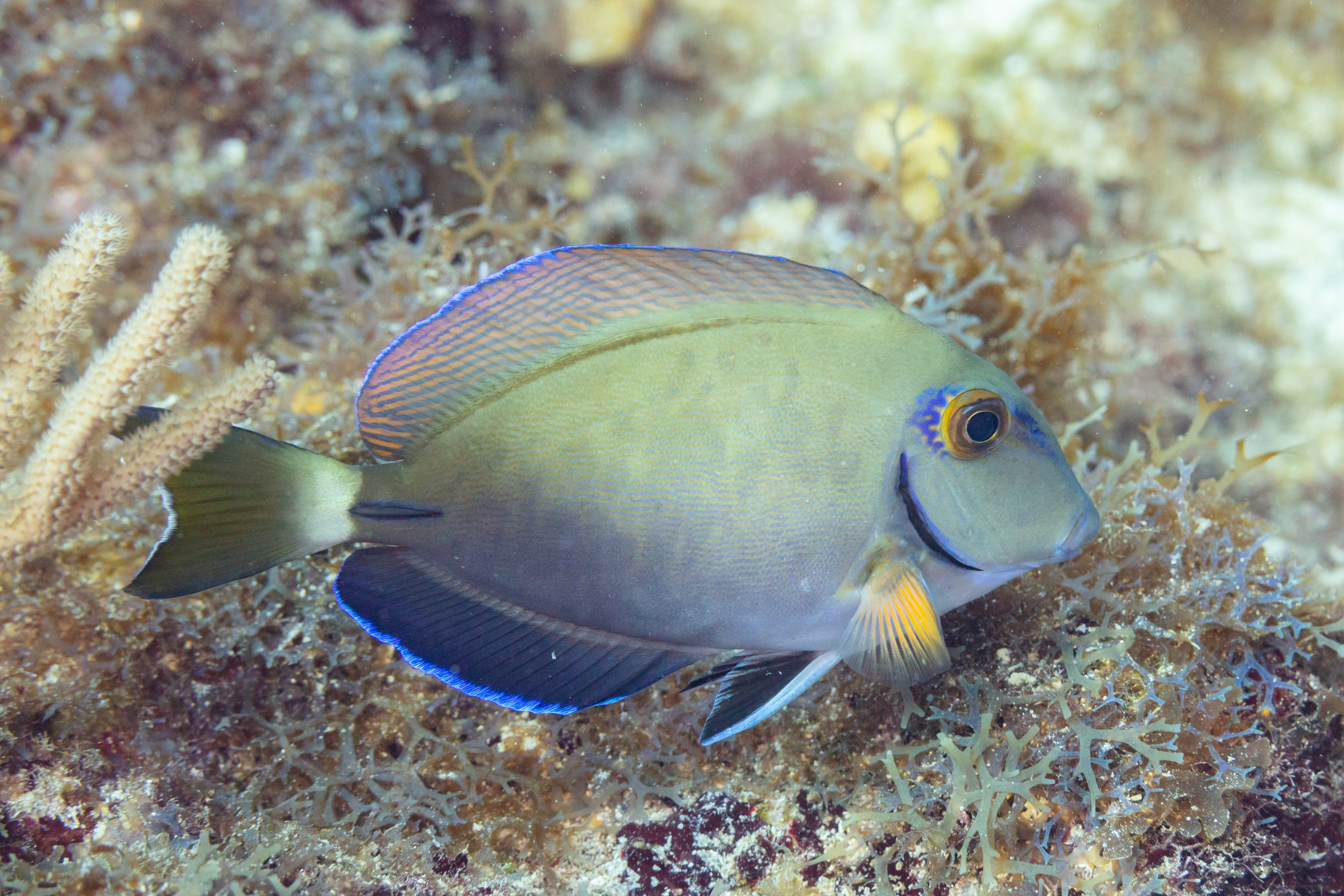
In Belize

Acanthurus tractus is a common species with a widespread distribution; it faces no known major threats, and is neither targeted by the fishing industry nor by the aquarium trade to any great extent. For these reasons, the International Union for Conservation of Nature has assessed its conservation status as being of least concern.
