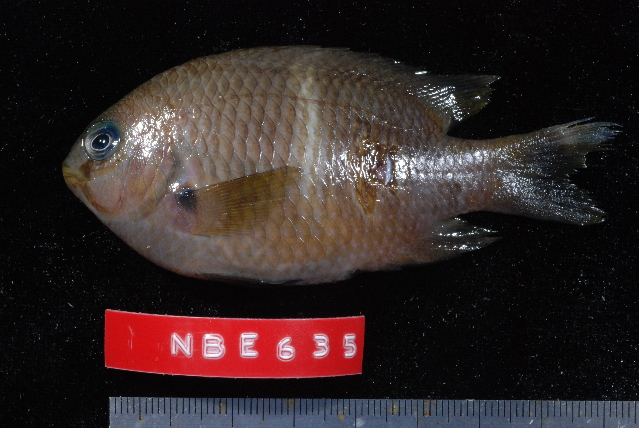

Conservation status
- Least Concern (IUCN 3.1)

Scientific classification
- Kingdom: Animalia
- Phylum: Chordata
- Class: Actinopterygii
- Order: Blenniiformes
- Family: Pomacentridae
- Genus: Plectroglyphidodon
- Species: P. leucozonus

Binomial name
- Plectroglyphidodon leucozonus (Bleeker, 1859)

Synonyms
- Abudefduf atrapinna Seale, 1935; Abudefduf cingulum (Klunzinger, 1871); Abudefduf corneyi Jordan and Dickerson, 1908; Abudefduf leucozonus (Bleeker, 1859); Abudefduf melanozonatus Aoyagi, 1941; Abudefduf yamashinai Okada and Ikeda, 1937; Chrysiptera yamashinai (Okada and Ikeda, 1937); Glyphidodon cingulum Klunzinger, 1871; Plectroglyphidodon leucozonus leucozonus (Bleeker, 1859)

= Plectroglyphidodon leucozonus =

Species of fish

Plectroglyphidodon leucozonus is a species of Perciformes in the family Pomacentridae.
