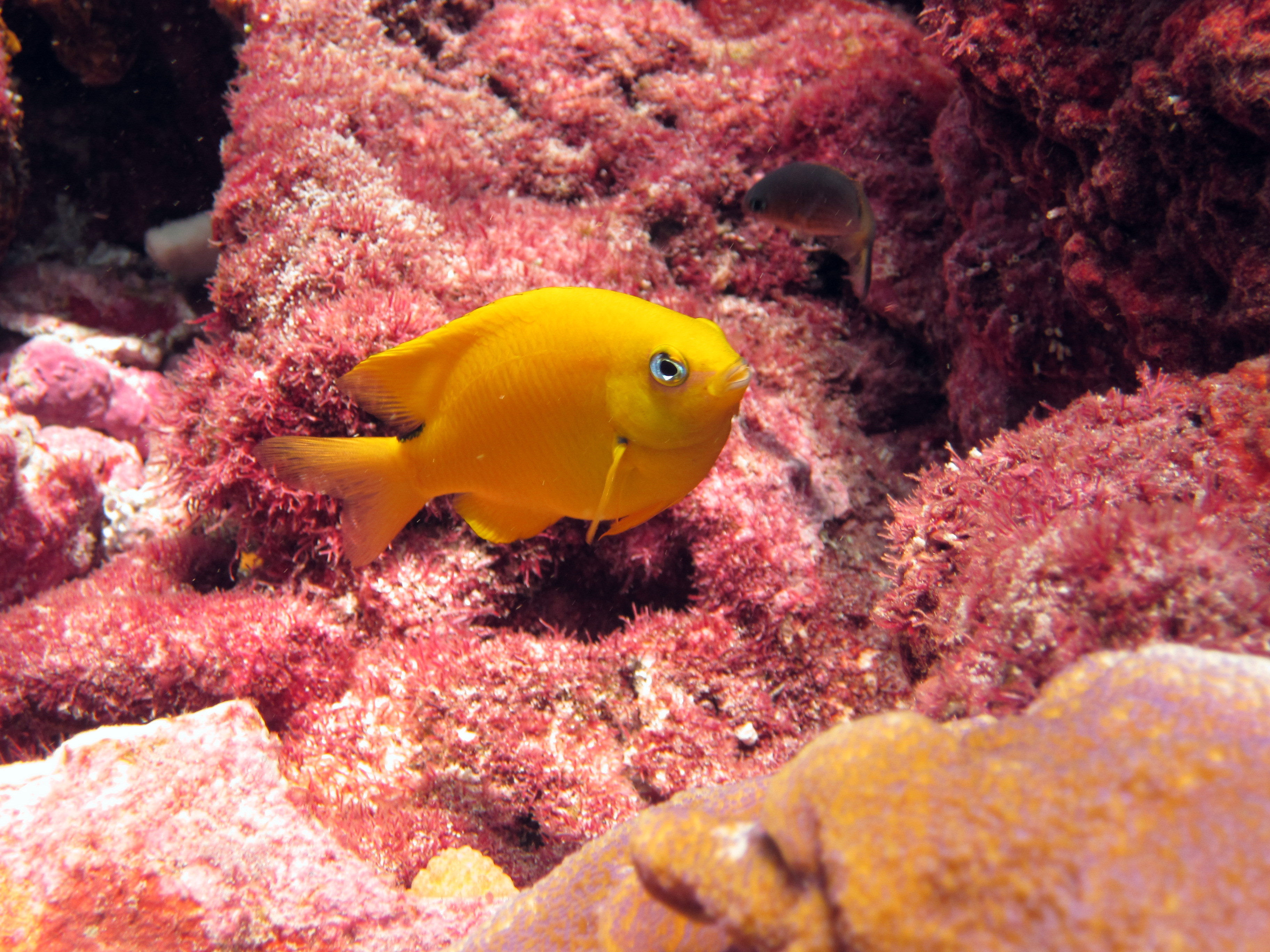

Conservation status
- Least Concern (IUCN 3.1)

Scientific classification
- Kingdom: Animalia
- Phylum: Chordata
- Class: Actinopterygii
- Order: Blenniiformes
- Family: Pomacentridae
- Genus: Plectroglyphidodon
- Species: P. aureus

Binomial name
- Plectroglyphidodon aureus (Fowler, 1927)

Synonyms
- Pomacentrus aureus Fowler, 1927; Parapomacentrus aureus (Fowler, 1927); Stegastes aureus (Fowler, 1927)

= Plectroglyphidodon aureus =

Species of fish

Plectroglyphidodon aureus, the golden gregory, is a damselfish of the family Pomacentridae native to islands in the tropical Pacific Ocean, its range including New Caledonia, the Gilbert Islands, Line Island, Phoenix Island, Samoa, the Tuamotu Archipelago, and the Marquesas Islands. It is found on coral reefs at depths ranging from 1 to 5 m (3 ft 3 in to 16 ft 5 in).
