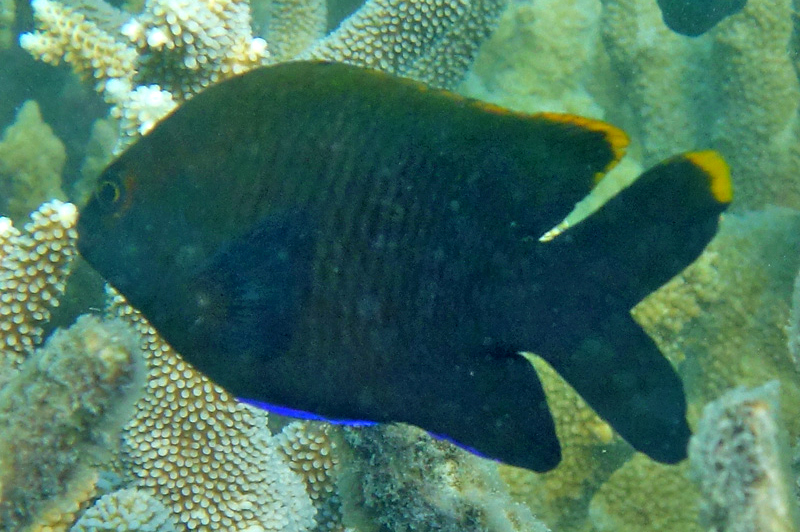

Scientific classification
- Kingdom: Animalia
- Phylum: Chordata
- Class: Actinopterygii
- Order: Blenniiformes
- Family: Pomacentridae
- Genus: Plectroglyphidodon
- Species: P. apicalis

Binomial name
- Plectroglyphidodon apicalis (De Vis, 1885)

Synonyms
- Pomacentrus apicalis De Vis, 1885; Stegastes apicalis (De Vis, 1885)

= Plectroglyphidodon apicalis =

Species of fish

Plectroglyphidodon apicalis, commonly known as the Australian gregory or yellowtip gregory, is a damselfish of the family Pomacentridae. It is native to the Western Pacific where it occurs on the east coast of Australia, the Great Barrier Reef, Queensland and New South Wales. It has also been reported from Taiwan and Ouvéa Island in the Loyalty Islands.

The body of P. apicalis is dark brown, with red or yellow margins on the caudal and dorsal fins. The brown color arises from melanosomes containing some pheomelanin unlike most fish species the melanin of which is eumelanin.
