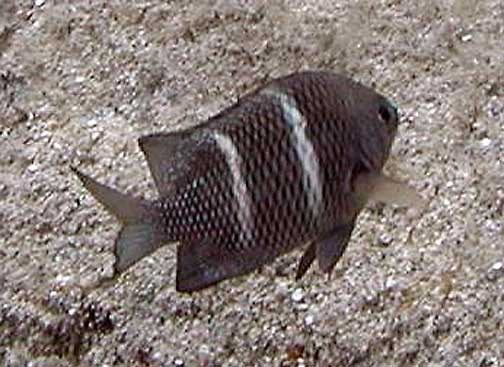

Scientific classification
- Domain: Eukaryota
- Kingdom: Animalia
- Phylum: Chordata
- Class: Actinopterygii
- Order: Blenniiformes
- Family: Pomacentridae
- Genus: Plectroglyphidodon
- Species: P. sindonis

Binomial name
- Plectroglyphidodon sindonis (D.S. Jordan and Evermann, 1903)

Synonyms
- Glyphisodon sindonis D.S. Jordan & Evermann, 1903; Abudefduf sindonis (D.S. Jordan & Evermann, 1903)

= Plectroglyphidodon sindonis =

Species of fish

Plectroglyphidodon sindonis is a species of damselfish in the family Pomacentridae. It is found in the Pacific Ocean.

== Distribution and habitat ==
This fish only occurs naturally in the Pacific Ocean around Hawaii. It usually lives in coral reefs at depths of 3 meters (9.8 ft).

== Description ==
Adults have a maximum size of 10 centimeters (3.9 in). It has 12 dorsal spines, 19 to 20 dorsal soft rays, two anal spines, and 15 to 16 anal soft rays. They are brown with two vertical white stripes.

== Ecology ==
=== Diet ===
Benthic algae and small invertebrates make up the diet for this fish.

=== Parasites ===
Parasites of this fish include Echinoplectanum plectropomi, Mitotrema anthostomatum, Pacificreadium serrani, and Trochopus plectropomi.

== In the aquarium ==
This fish is found in many aquariums as a hobby fish.
