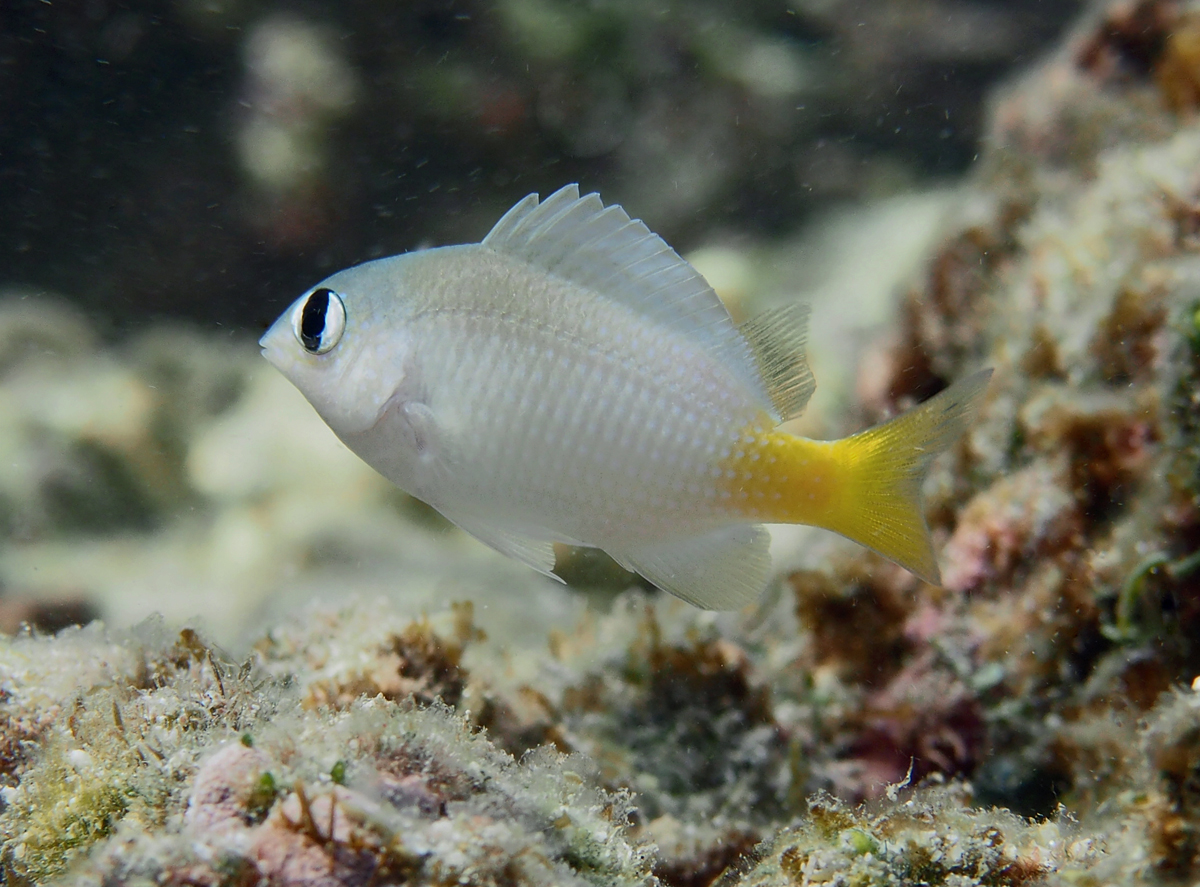

Conservation status
- Least Concern (IUCN 3.1)

Scientific classification
- Kingdom: Animalia
- Phylum: Chordata
- Class: Actinopterygii
- Order: Blenniiformes
- Family: Pomacentridae
- Genus: Plectroglyphidodon
- Species: P. imparipennis

Binomial name
- Plectroglyphidodon imparipennis (Vaillant and Sauvage, 1875)

Synonyms
- List: Glyphisodon imparipennis Vaillant & Sauvage, 1875; Abudefduf imparipennis (Vaillant & Sauvage, 1875); Abudefduf iwasakii Okada and Ikeda, 1939; Chromis elaphrus Jenkins, 1903; Abudefduf iwasakii Okada & Ikeda, 1939; Chrysiptera prughi Fowler, 1946; Oliglyphisodon caeruleomaculatus Fowler, 1946

= Plectroglyphidodon imparipennis =

Species of fish

Plectroglyphidodon imparipennis is a species of damselfish in the family Pomacentridae. It is found in the Indo-Pacific.

Adults can grow up to 6 centimetres (2.4 in) TL.

== Distribution and habitat ==
This species of fish is found in the Indo-Pacific form eastern Africa to the Line Islands and Pitcairn Islands north to the Philippines and the Ryukyu Islands.

== Description ==
Adults of this species can grow up to 6 centimetres (2.4 in) TL. This fish is white in colouration with a yellow caudal fin. Its dorsal fin has 12 spines and 14 to 15 soft rays. Its anal fin has 2 spines and 11 to 12 soft rays.

== Ecology ==
=== Diet ===
This fish feeds on benthic algae and invertebrates.

=== Behaviour ===
Adults stay close to their shelter.
