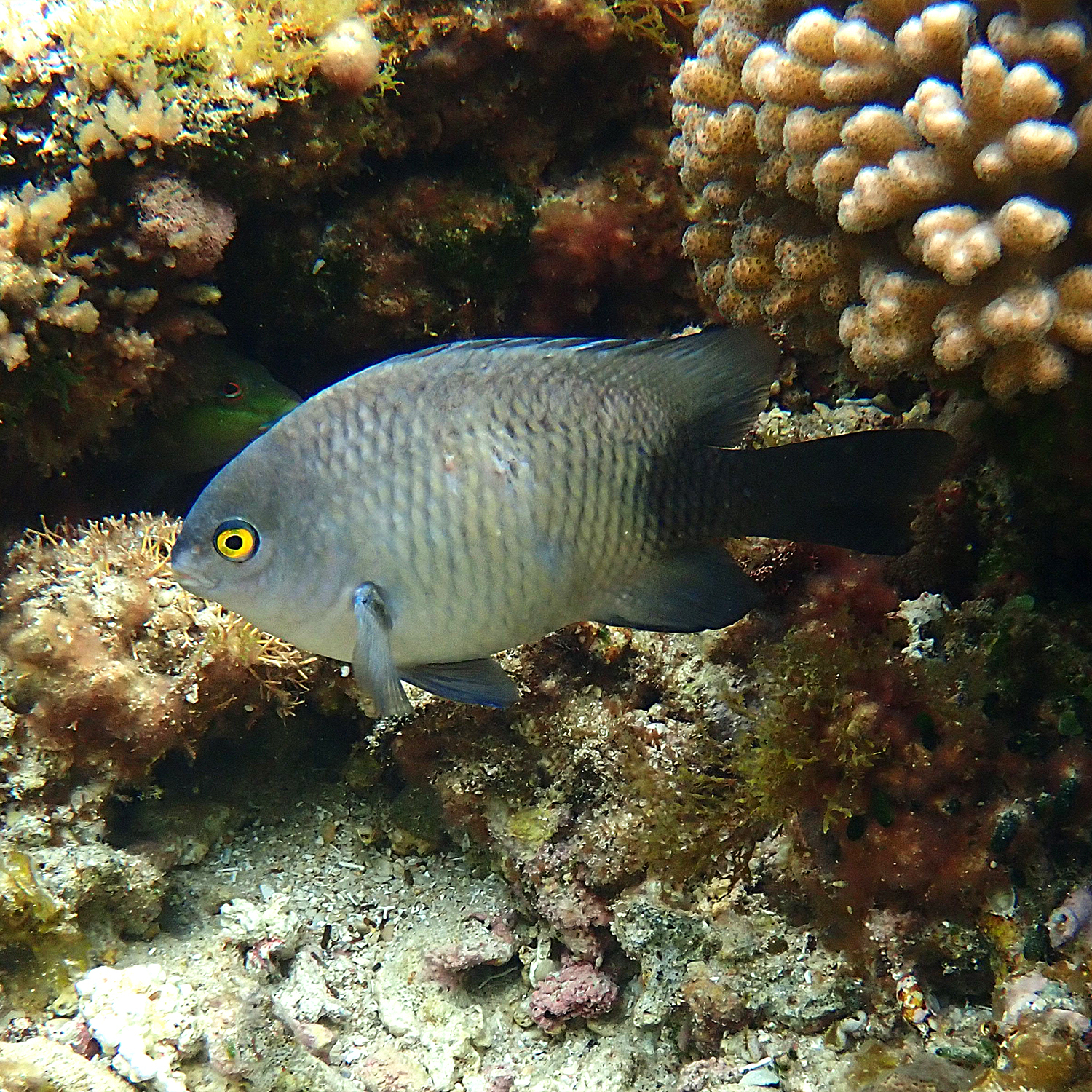

Conservation status
- Least Concern (IUCN 3.1)

Scientific classification
- Kingdom: Animalia
- Phylum: Chordata
- Class: Actinopterygii
- Order: Blenniiformes
- Family: Pomacentridae
- Genus: Plectroglyphidodon
- Species: P. fasciolatus

Binomial name
- Plectroglyphidodon fasciolatus (Ogilby, 1889)

Synonyms
- List: Eupomacentrus fasciolatus (Ogilby, 1889); Eupomacentrus paschalis Whitley, 1929; Pomacentrus atrilabiatus Fowler, 1946; Pomacentrus craticulus J. L. B. Smith, 1965; Pomacentrus fasciolatus Ogilby, 1889; Pomacentrus jenkinsi D.S. Jordan & Evermann, 1903; Pomacentrus niomatus De Vis, 1884; Pomacentrus vanderbilti Fowler, 1941; Pseudopomacentrus navalis Whitley, 1964; Stegastes fasciolatus (Ogilby, 1889)

= Plectroglyphidodon fasciolatus =

Species of fish

Plectroglyphidodon fasciolatus, commonly called the Pacific gregory, is a species of damselfish in the family Pomacentridae. It is native to the tropical western Indo-Pacific. It feeds on filamentous algae.

== Distribution and habitat ==
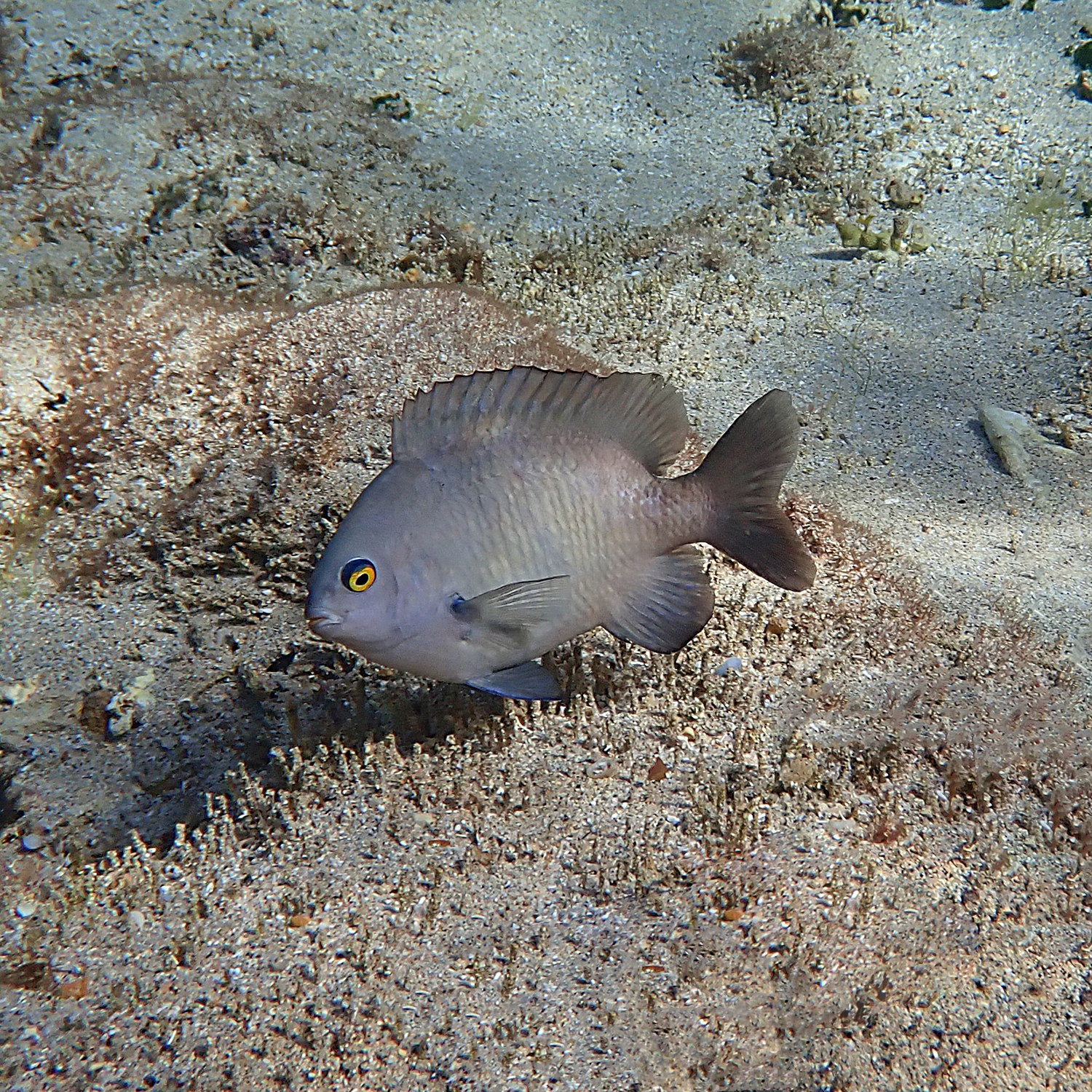
At Norfolk Island

Plectroglyphidodon fasciolatus is native to the western Indo-Pacific region. Its range extends from East Africa to Australia and the Kermadec Islands including Hawaii, Easter Island and the Ryukyu Islands, where it is found on shallow seaward reefs particularly in areas with mild to moderate water movement. At Lord Howe Island and Easter Island it occurs from shallow surge pools down to depths of at least 30 m (98 ft).

== Behavior ==
Plectroglyphidodon fasciolatus is a territorial fish and may defend a small area for nesting or food. When algae is plentiful, they are less aggressive.
