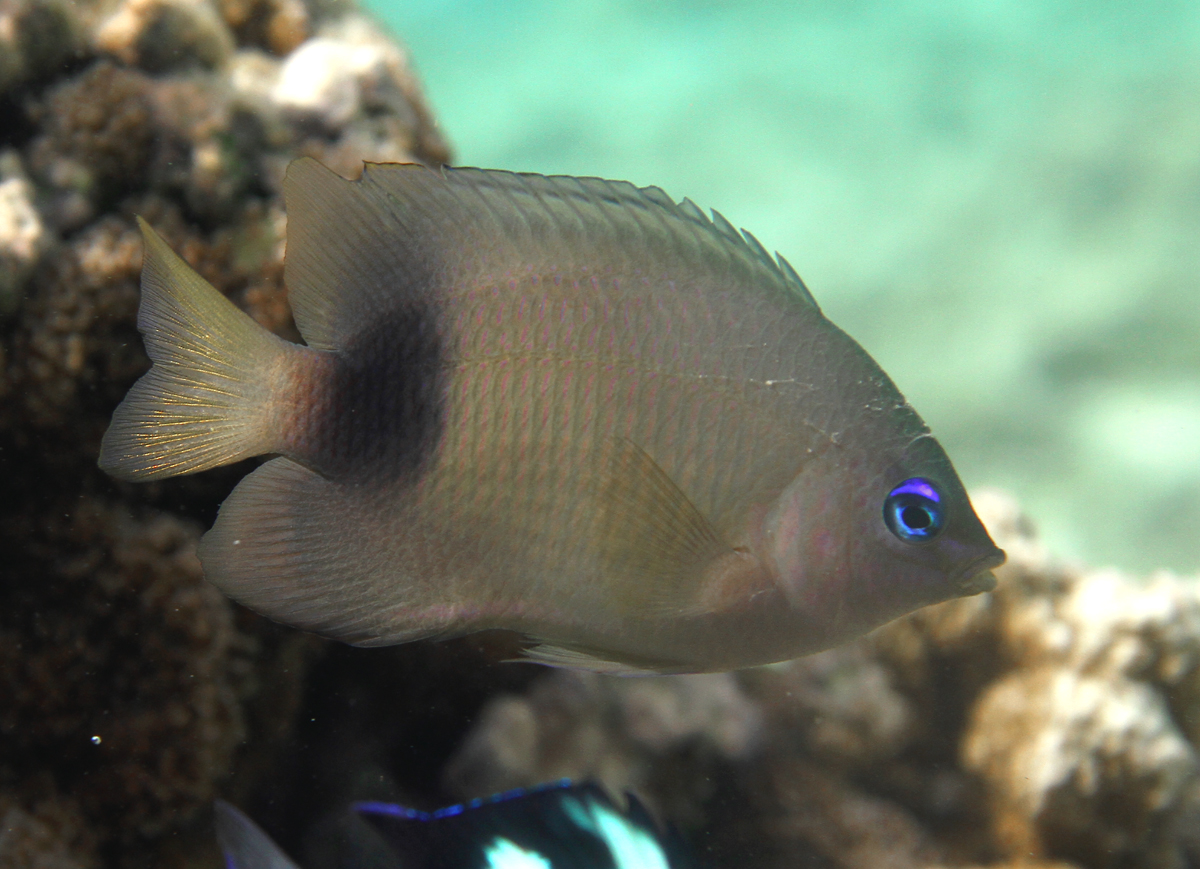
- Plectroglyphidodon johnstonianus

Scientific classification
- Kingdom: Animalia
- Phylum: Chordata
- Class: Actinopterygii
- Order: Blenniiformes
- Family: Pomacentridae
- Subfamily: Pomacentrinae
- Genus: Plectroglyphidodon; Fowler and Ball, 1924

Type species
- Plectroglyphidodon johnstonianus Fowler & Ball, 1924

Synonyms
- Negostegastes Whitley, 1929; Oliglyphisodon Fowler, 1941; Pterocyclosoma Fowler, 1941

= Plectroglyphidodon =

Genus of fishes

Plectroglyphidodon is a genus of fish in the family Pomacentridae.

== Species ==
| Species | Image |
|---|---|
| Plectroglyphidodon altus (Okada and Ikeda, 1937) | |
| Plectroglyphidodon apicalis (De Vis, 1885) | |
| Plectroglyphidodon aureus (Fowler, 1927) | |
| Plectroglyphidodon dickii (Liénard, 1839) | |
| Plectroglyphidodon emeryi (Allen and Randall, 1974) | |
| Plectroglyphidodon fasciolatus (Ogilby, 1889) | |
| Plectroglyphidodon flaviventris Allen and Randall, 1974 | |
| Plectroglyphidodon gascoynei (Whitley, 1964) | |
| Plectroglyphidodon imparipennis (Vaillant and Sauvage, 1875) | |
| Plectroglyphidodon insularis (Allen and Emery, 1985) | |
| Plectroglyphidodon johnstonianus Fowler and Ball, 1924 | |
| Plectroglyphidodon leucozonus (Bleeker, 1859) | |
| Plectroglyphidodon luteobrunneus (Smith, 1960) | |
| Plectroglyphidodon marginatus (Jenkins, 1901) | |
| Plectroglyphidodon obreptus (Whitley, 1948) | |
| Plectroglyphidodon phoenixensis (Schultz, 1943) | |
| Plectroglyphidodon randalli Allen, 1991 | |
| Plectroglyphidodon sagmarius Randall and Earle, 1999 | |
| Plectroglyphidodon sindonis (D.S. Jordan and Evermann, 1903) | |
