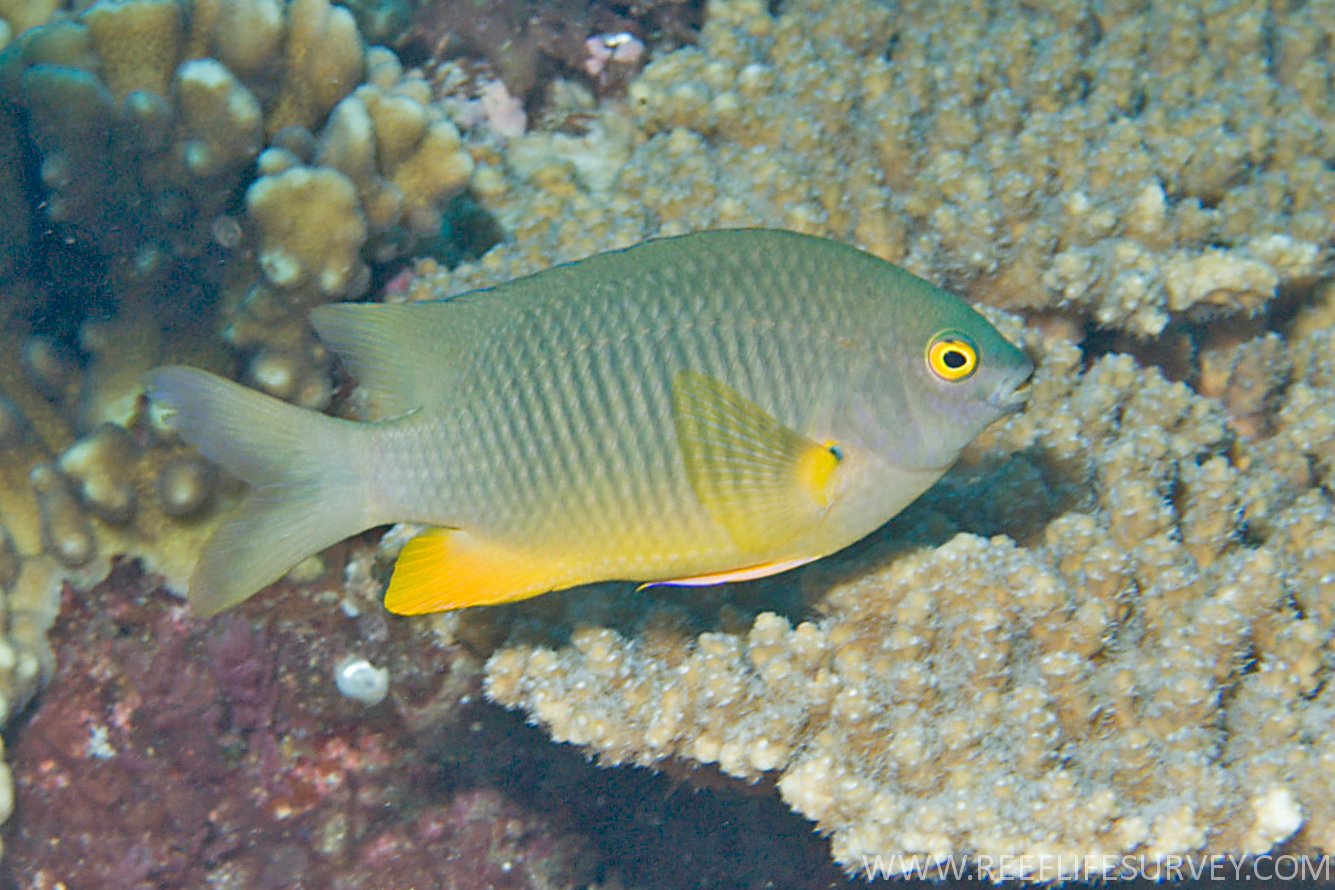

Conservation status
- Least Concern (IUCN 3.1)

Scientific classification
- Kingdom: Animalia
- Phylum: Chordata
- Class: Actinopterygii
- Order: Blenniiformes
- Family: Pomacentridae
- Genus: Plectroglyphidodon
- Species: P. gascoynei

Binomial name
- Plectroglyphidodon gascoynei (Whitley, 1964)

Synonyms
- Pseudopomacentrus gascoyneiWhitley, 1964; Stegastes gascoynei(Whitley, 1964)

= Coral Sea gregory =

Species of fish

The Coral Sea gregory (Plectroglyphidodon gascoynei) is a damselfish of the family Pomacentridae in the western Pacific Ocean at depths between 1 and 30 m. Its length is up to 15 cm. The specific name commemorates the Royal Australian Navy River-class frigate HMAS Gascoyne, from which the type specimen was collected.
