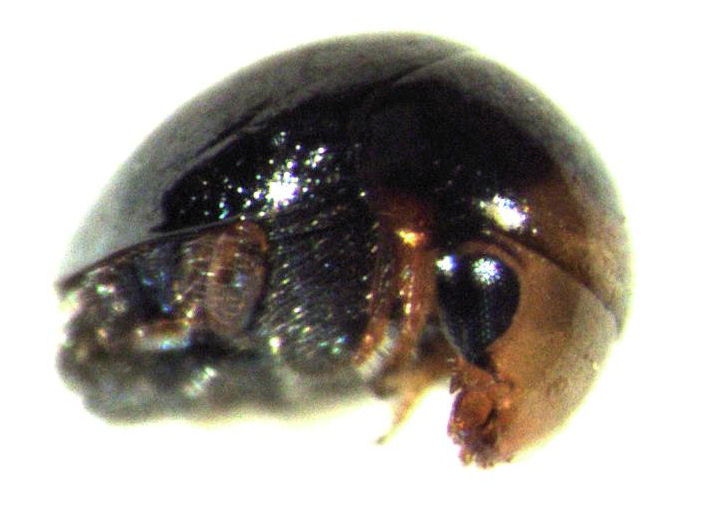
- Cybocephalus sp. (adult male)

Scientific classification
- Kingdom: Animalia
- Phylum: Arthropoda
- Class: Insecta
- Order: Coleoptera
- Suborder: Polyphaga
- Infraorder: Cucujiformia
- Family: Cybocephalidae
- Subfamily: Cybocephalinae
- Genus: Cybocephalus; Erichson, 1844

= Cybocephalus =

Genus of beetles

Cybocephalus is a genus of beetles in the family Cybocephalidae, previously belonging to the subfamily Cybocephalinae of the family Nitidulidae, and comprising over 200 described species.

== Selected species ==
- Cybocephalus aegyptianus Endrödy-Younga^{g}
- Cybocephalus atomus C.Brisout de Barneville, 1866^{g}
- Cybocephalus balticus Kurochkin & Kirejtshuk, 2010^{g}
- Cybocephalus bourbonnensis Vinson, 1959^{g}
- Cybocephalus brevis Grouvelle, 1913^{g}
- Cybocephalus bulbophthalmus Endrödy-Younga, 1962^{g}
- Cybocephalus californicus Horn, 1879^{i c g b}
- Cybocephalus canariensis Endrody-Younga, 1968^{g}
- Cybocephalus caribaeus Smith^{g}
- Cybocephalus championi Smith^{g}
- Cybocephalus chlorocapitis^{g}
- Cybocephalus decaeni Vinson, 1959^{g}
- Cybocephalus diadematus Chevrolat, 1861^{g}
- Cybocephalus electricus Kurochkin & Kirejtshuk, 2010^{g}
- Cybocephalus etiennei Endrödy-Younga, 1982^{g}
- Cybocephalus festivus Erichson, 1845^{g}
- Cybocephalus flavocapitis Smith^{g}
- Cybocephalus fodori Endrödy-Younga, 1965^{g}
- Cybocephalus freyi Endrody-Younga, 1968^{g}
- Cybocephalus gomyi Endrödy-Younga, 1982^{g}
- Cybocephalus heydeni Reitter, 1875^{g}
- Cybocephalus huastecus Smith^{g}
- Cybocephalus hughscotti Vinson, 1959^{g}
- Cybocephalus kathrynae Smith in Smith and Cave, 2006^{i c g}
- Cybocephalus kerneggeri Kurochkin & Kirejtshuk, 2010^{g}
- Cybocephalus krimicus Endrody-Younga, 1968^{g}
- Cybocephalus liui Tian^{g}
- Cybocephalus mauritiensis Vinson, 1959^{g}
- Cybocephalus mediterraneus Endrody-Younga, 1968^{g}
- Cybocephalus membranaceus Reitter, 1874^{g}
- Cybocephalus metallicus Baudi de Selve, 1870^{g}
- Cybocephalus micans Reitter, 1874^{g}
- Cybocephalus mollis Endrödy-Younga, 1964^{g}
- Cybocephalus nigritulus LeConte, 1863^{i c g b}
- Cybocephalus nipponicus Endrödy-Younga, 1971^{i c g b}
- Cybocephalus planiceps Endrödy-Younga, 1968^{g}
- Cybocephalus politissimus Reitter, 1898^{g}
- Cybocephalus politus Gyllenhal, 1813^{g}
- Cybocephalus pulchellus Erichson, 1845^{g}
- Cybocephalus pullus Endrödy-Younga, 1962^{g}
- Cybocephalus randalli Smith in Smith & Cave, 2006^{i c g b}
- Cybocephalus reitteri Uhagon, 1876^{g}
- Cybocephalus rufifrons Reitter, 1874^{g}
- Cybocephalus schwarzi Champion^{g}
- Cybocephalus seminulum Baudi, 1870^{g}
- Cybocephalus similiceps Jacquelin du Val, 1858^{g}
- Cybocephalus sphaerula (Wollaston, 1854)^{g}
- Cybocephalus taiwanensis Tian & Pan, 1994^{g}
- Cybocephalus tantillus Grouvelle, 1913^{g}
- Cybocephalus vinsoni Endrödy-Younga, 1964^{g}
- Cybocephalus wollastoni Har.Lindberg, 1951^{g}

Data sources: i = ITIS, c = Catalogue of Life, g = GBIF, b = Bugguide.net
