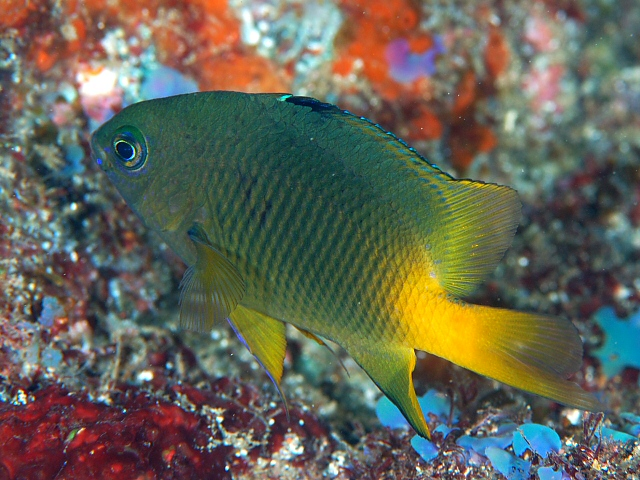

Scientific classification
- Kingdom: Animalia
- Phylum: Chordata
- Class: Actinopterygii
- Division: Teleostei
- Order: Blenniiformes
- Family: Pomacentridae
- Genus: Plectroglyphidodon
- Species: P. altus

Binomial name
- Plectroglyphidodon altus (Okada & Ikeda, 1937)

Synonyms
- Eupomacentrus altus (Okada & Ikeda, 1937); Pomacentrus altus Okada & Ikeda, 1937; Stegastes altus (Okada & Ikeda, 1937)

= Plectroglyphidodon altus =

Species of fish

Plectroglyphidodon altus, commonly known as the Japanese gregory, is a damselfish of the family Pomacentridae.

It is native to the northwestern Pacific Ocean in the seas around Japan and the Ryukyu Islands. It has also been reported from Taiwan and South Korea. It is found on rocky reefs at depths ranging from 5 to 20 m (16 to 66 ft).
