= Heteronyx randalli =

Scientific classification
- Kingdom: Animalia
- Phylum: Arthropoda
- Clade: Pancrustacea
- Class: Insecta
- Order: Coleoptera
- Suborder: Polyphaga
- Infraorder: Scarabaeiformia
- Family: Scarabaeidae
- Genus: Heteronyx
- Species: H. randalli

Binomial name
- Heteronyx randalli Blackburn, 1890

Synonyms
- Heteronyx femoralis Blackburn, 1909; Heteronyx severus Blackburn, 1892

Species of beetle

Heteronyx randalli is a species of beetle of the family Scarabaeidae. It is found in Australia (Northern Territory, South Australia, New South Wales, Western Australia).

== Description ==
Adults reach a length of about 7–9 mm (0.28–0.35 in). They are castaneous, with a shining dorsal surface. The frons and clypeus are coarsely punctured and covered with short setae. The pronotum and elytra are uniformly setose.
