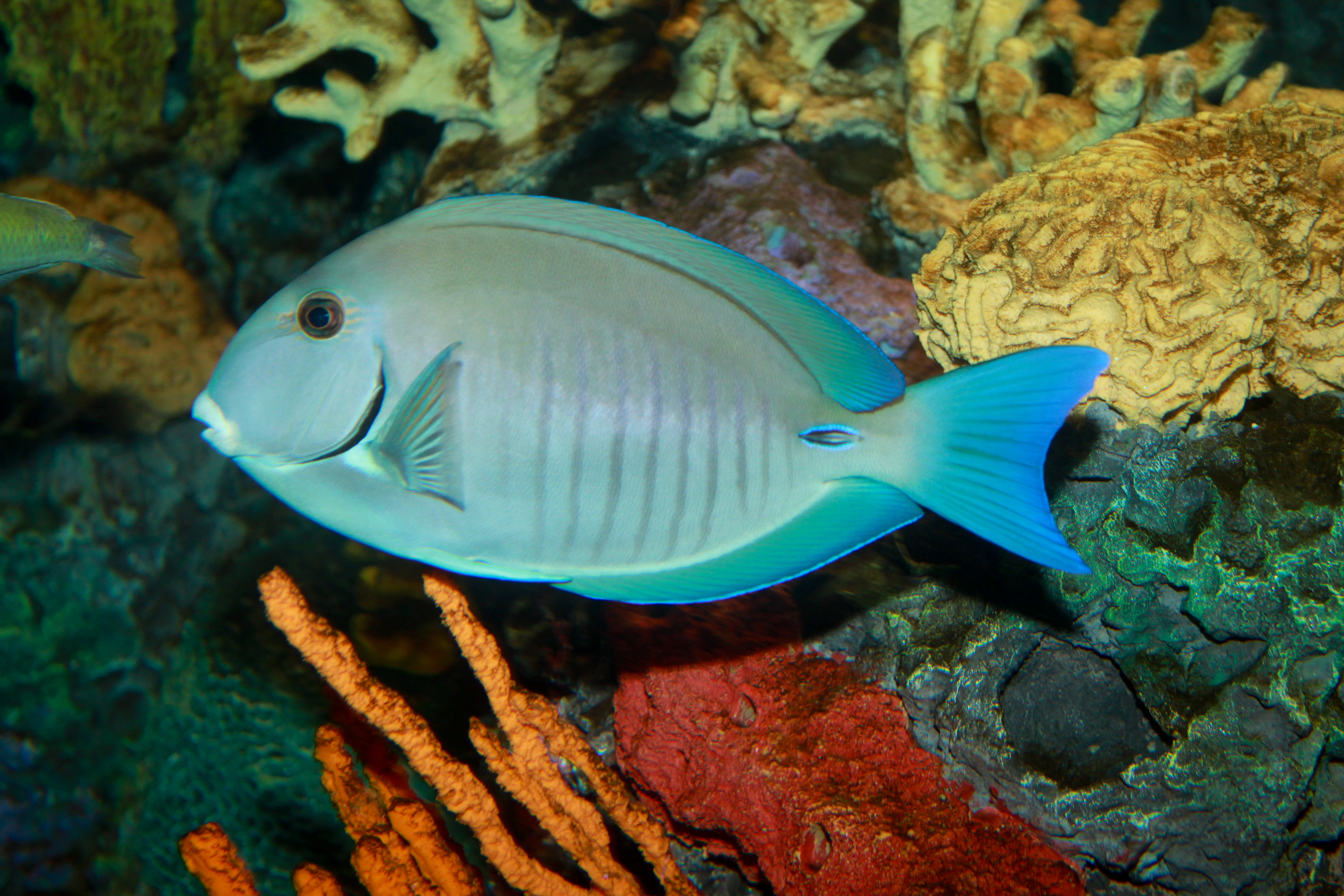

Conservation status
- Least Concern (IUCN 3.1)

Scientific classification
- Kingdom: Animalia
- Phylum: Chordata
- Class: Actinopterygii
- Division: Teleostei
- Order: Acanthuriformes
- Family: Acanthuridae
- Genus: Acanthurus
- Species: A. chirurgus

Binomial name
- Acanthurus chirurgus (Bloch, 1787)
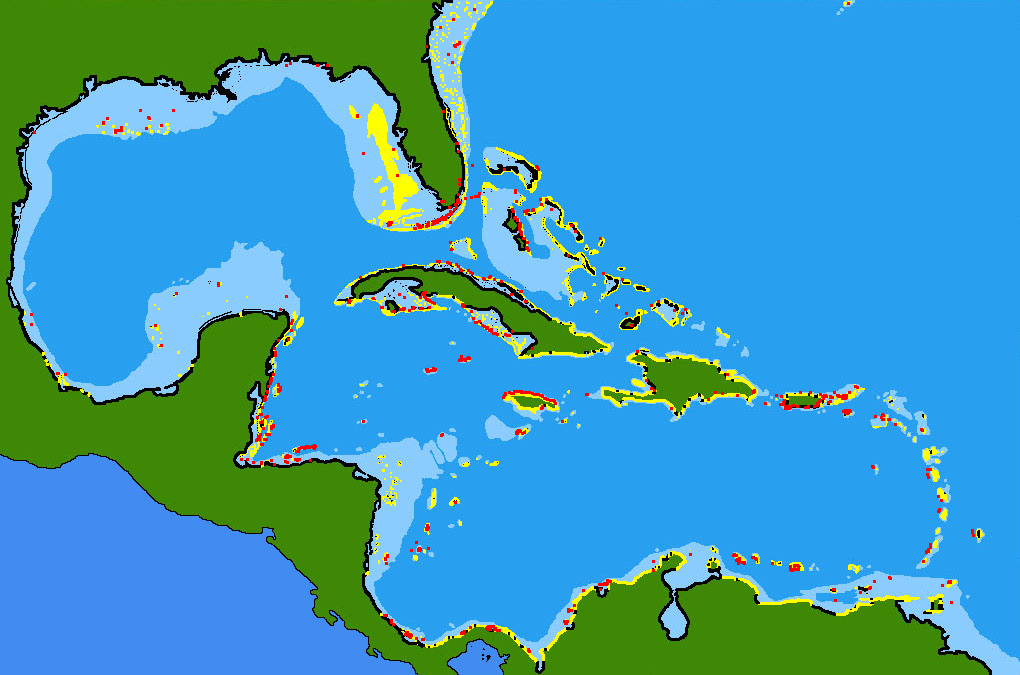

Synonyms
- Chaetodon chirurgus Bloch, 1787; Acanthurus phlebotomus Valenciennes, 1835

= Doctorfish tang =

Species of fish

The doctorfish tang (Acanthurus chirurgus), also known as the doctorfish, is a species of marine ray-finned fish belonging to the family Acanthuridae, the surgeonfishes, unicornfishes and tangs. These fishes are found in the western Atlantic Ocean.

== Taxonomy ==
The doctorfish tang was first formally described as Chaetodon chirurgus in 1787 by the German physician and naturalist Marcus Elieser Bloch with its type locality given as Martinique. The genus Acanthurus is one of two genera in the tribe Acanthurini which is one of three tribes in the subfamily Acanthurinae which is one of two subfamilies in the family Acanthuridae.

== Etymology ==
The doctorfish tang has the specific name chirurgus, meaning "surgeon", an allusion to the sharp scalpel-like spines on caudal peduncle, these also gave rise to the common names surgeonfish and doctorfish.

== Description ==
The doctorfish tang reaches a maximum size of 39 centimetres (15 in) and 5.1 kilograms (11 lb). Acanthurus chirurgus gets its common name for the structures called "scalpels", which are found on either side of the caudal peduncle. The "scalpel" is used during fights with other doctorfish and as a defense mechanism against predators. Its coloration generally varies from blue-gray to dark brown. 10 to 12 vertical bars are always present, but often faint. The edges of the caudal, dorsal, and anal fins are blue. There is also a faint blue ring that can be seen encircling the "scalpel" on either side.

There is a black morph, as well, but it is neither a subspecies nor a regional mutation. It has only been documented a limited number of times.

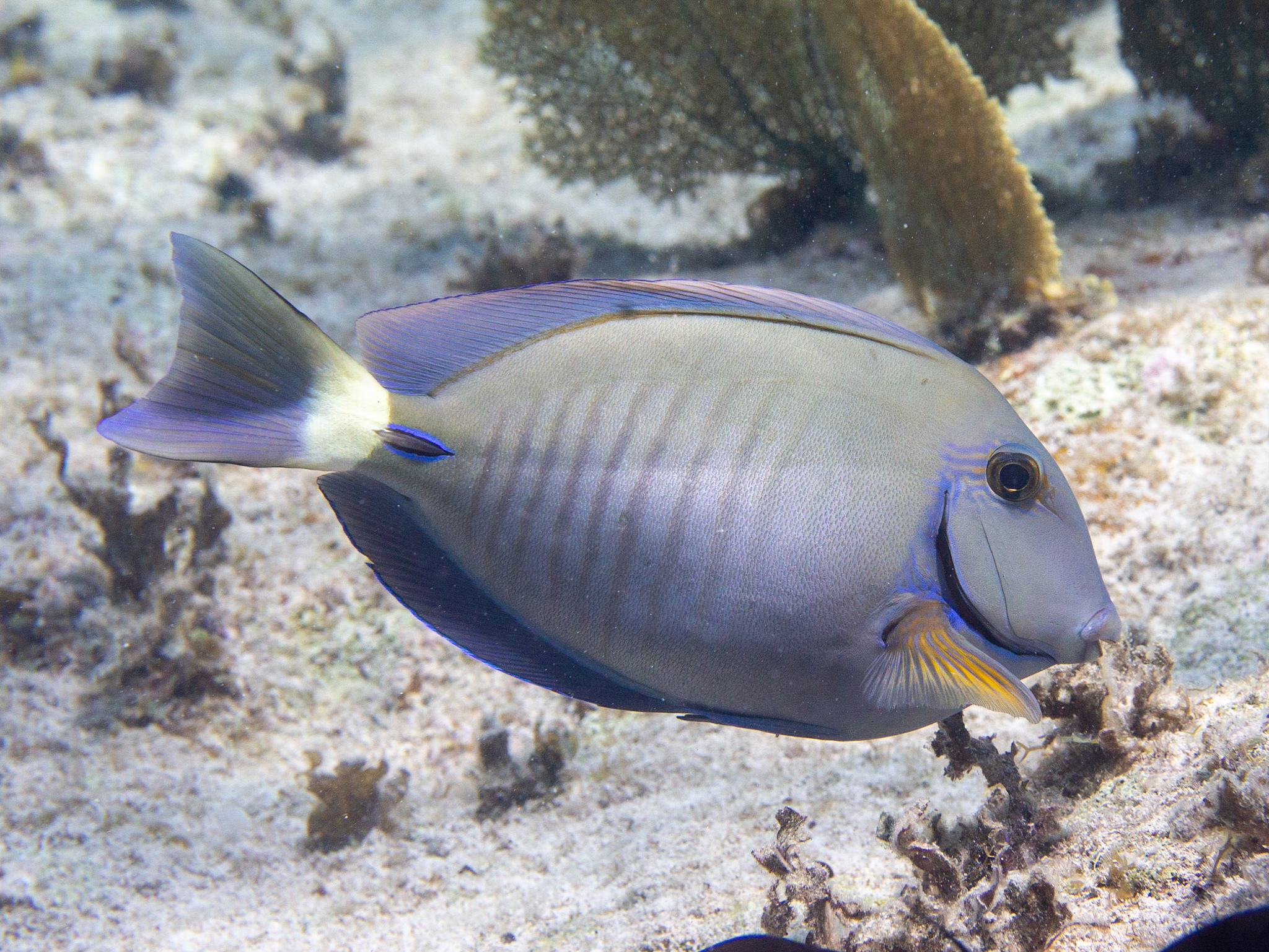
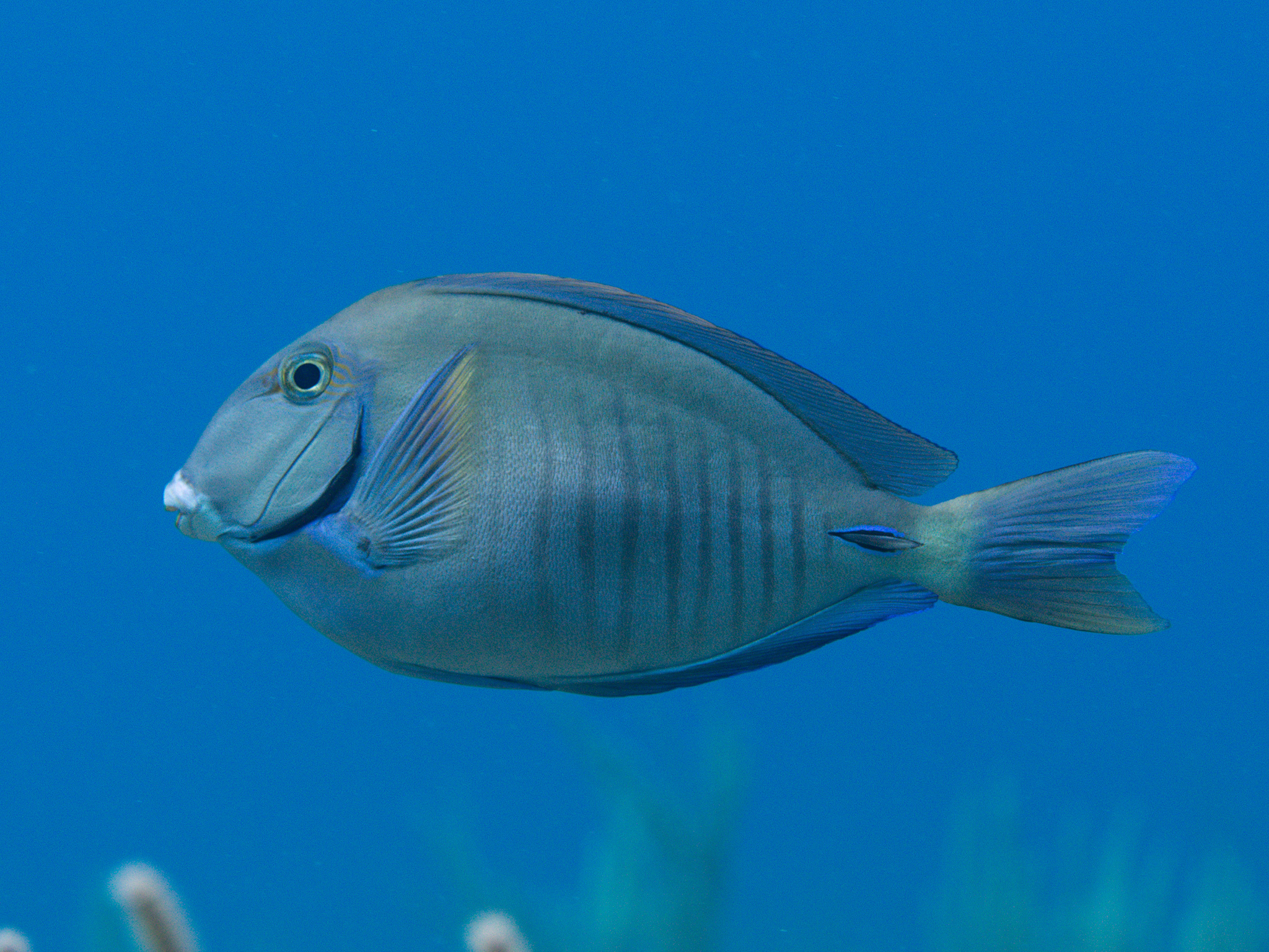
In Grand Cayman

== Range and habitat ==
This species is typically found among rocky outcrops and coral reefs. Its distribution includes the Atlantic from Massachusetts to Brazil, and the tropical west coast of Africa, although the African records may be misidentifications of Acanthurus monroviae. It has been recorded twice recently (2012, 2016) in the central Mediterranean Sea.

== Behavior ==
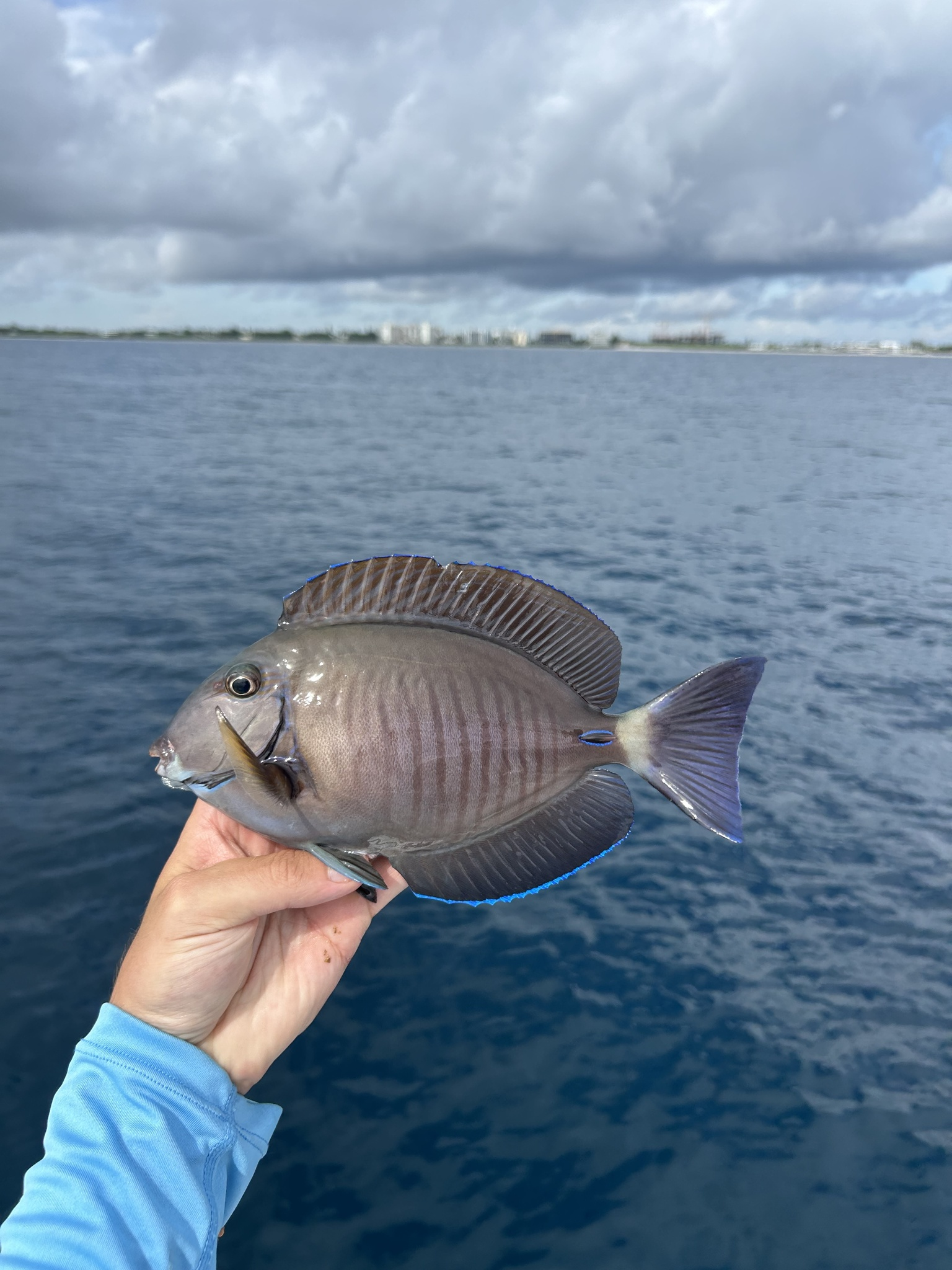
In Florida

Acanthurus chirurgus spends its daylight hours grazing on algae and organic detritus. Its teeth are specially shaped for scraping algae and plant matter from rocks. Because it swallows its food whole, it has a gizzard-like organ in the intestine filled with particles of sand which help to grind food before it starts the digestive process.

Spawning occurs during evening hours in a group event. Each egg is less than a millimeter in diameter and contains a small amount of oil for flotation. The translucent, plankton-like larvae hatch within 24 hours of fertilization. They are laterally compressed and diamond-shaped with large eyes and pectoral fins. Many body parts, such as scales and the dorsal and anal fins, do not develop until the larvae have reached 2–6 mm in length. The "scalpel" does not appear until they are about 13 mm long. As the "scalpel" grows, the anal and dorsal spines shrink. Once the fish reaches around 25 mm in length, it moves to the bottom where it continues to grow, eventually reaching sexual maturity in roughly nine months.
