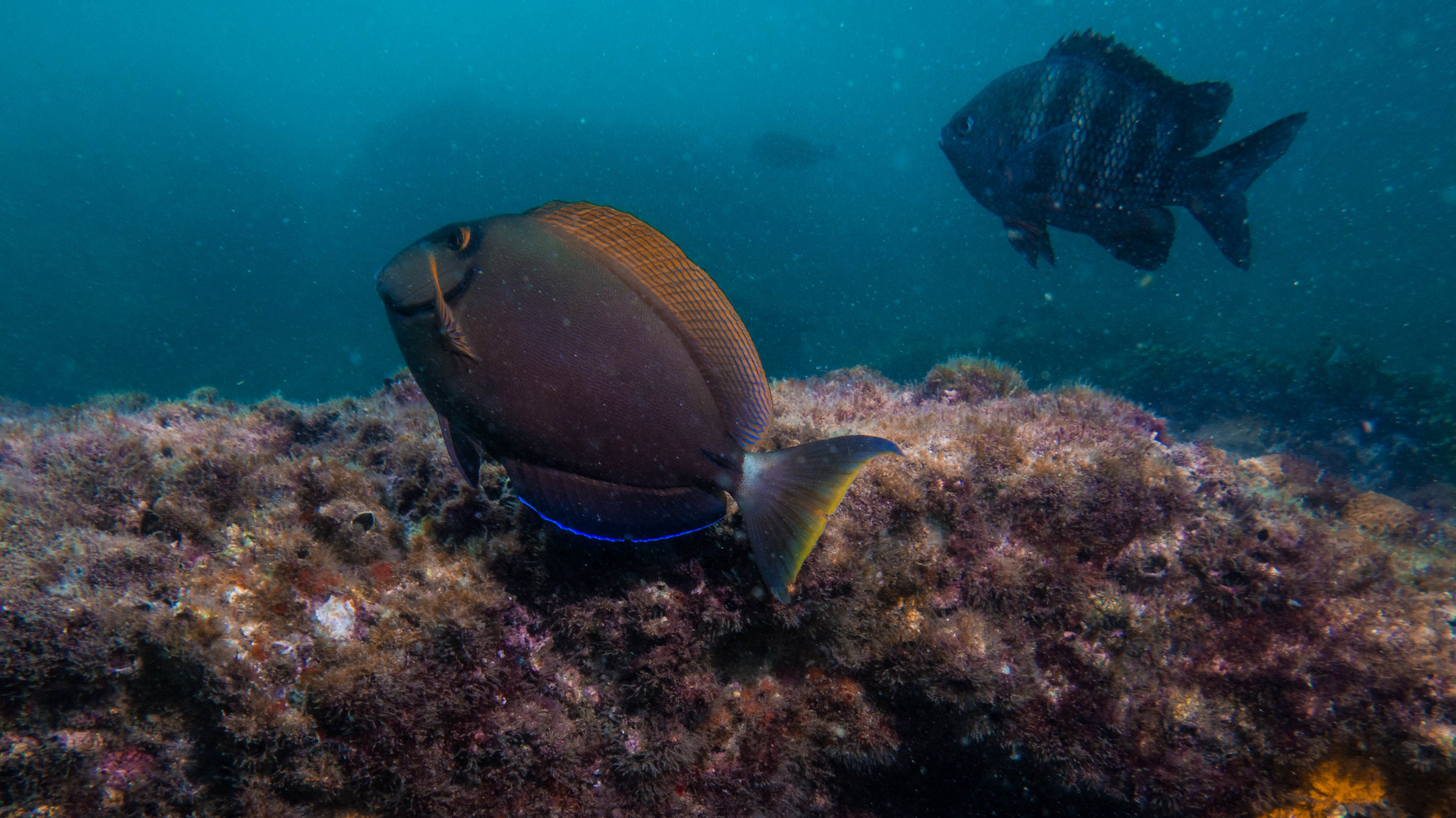

Conservation status
- Least Concern (IUCN 3.1)

Scientific classification
- Kingdom: Animalia
- Phylum: Chordata
- Class: Actinopterygii
- Division: Teleostei
- Order: Acanthuriformes
- Family: Acanthuridae
- Genus: Acanthurus
- Species: A. bahianus

Binomial name
- Acanthurus bahianus Castelnau, 1855

Synonyms
- Teuthis bahianus (Castelnau, 1855)

= Acanthurus bahianus =

Species of fish

Acanthurus bahianus, or the ocean surgeon or ocean surgeonfish, is a species of marine ray-finned fish belonging to the family Acanthuridae, the surgeonfishes, unicornfishes, and tangs. This species is found on reefs in the Atlantic Ocean off the coast of Brazil. It is sometimes marketed as a food item, but it is more often used as bait, or in tropical saltwater aquaria.

== Taxonomy ==
Acanthurus bahianus was first formally described in 1855 by the French naturalist François-Louis Laporte, comte de Castelnau with its type locality give as Bahia in Brazil. The genus Acanthurus is one of two genera in the tribe Acanthurini which is one of three tribes in the subfamily Acanthurinae which is one of two subfamilies in the family Acanthuridae.

This species was formerly thought to be widespread in the Western Atlantic north as far as Bermuda and Massachusetts but the populations in the North Atlantic differ morphologically and genetically from the South Atlantic populations and the northern Atlantic population is now recognised as the distinct species A. tractus.

== Description ==
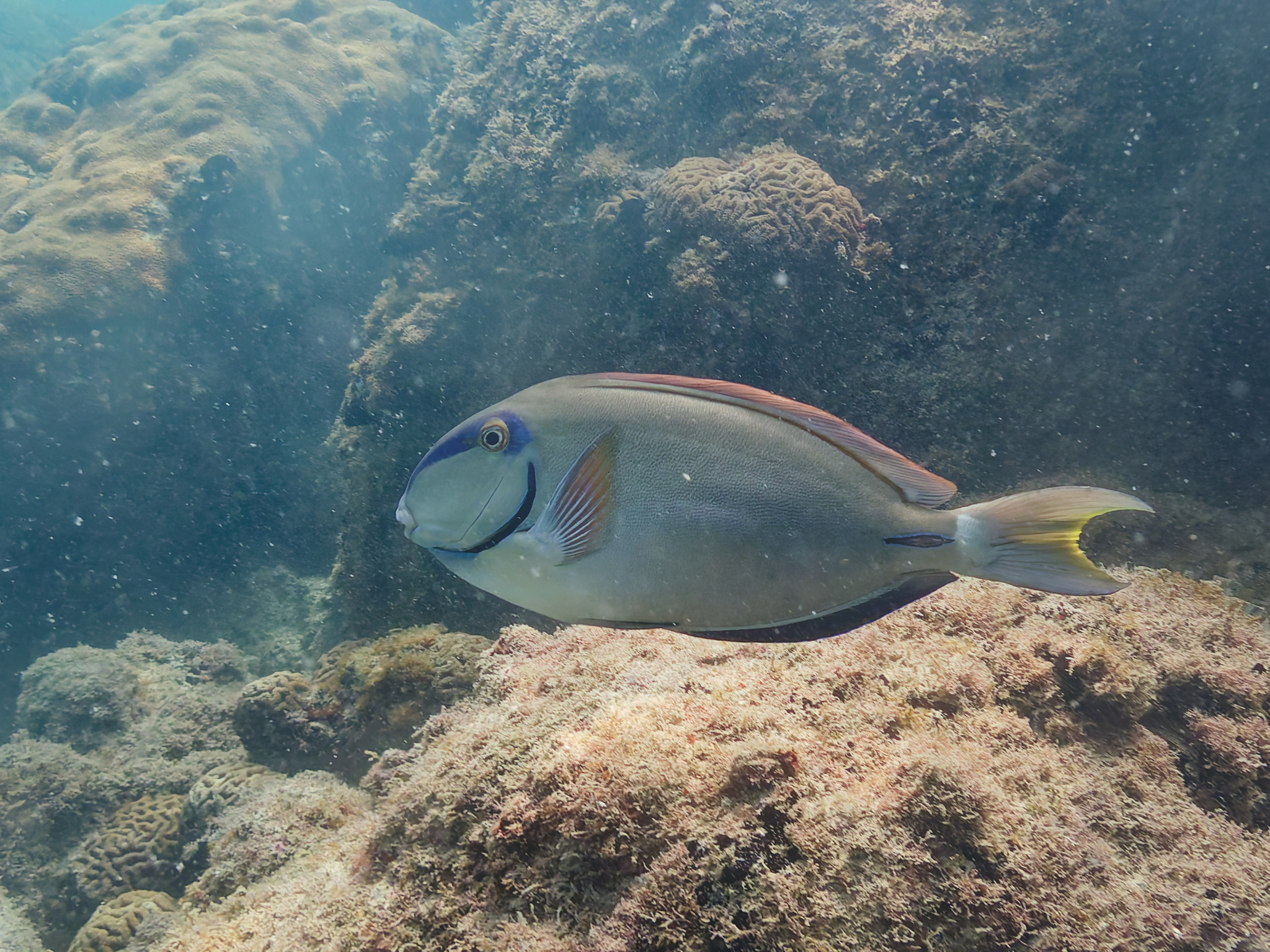
In Brazil

Acanthurus bahianus are known by their oval bodies with uniform color (usually blue-gray to dark brown), the pale to dark marking around the eyes, and the light yellow is now found on their bodies. Most have blue or white markings on the dorsal fin, anal fin, and tail fins and pale bands can sometimes be seen at the base of their tails. They often swim in schools with other species such as the Atlantic blue tang surgeonfish. They have been recorded up to 38 cm (15 in) in length. Ocean surgeons have a total of 9 spines on their dorsal fins and between 23 and 26 soft rays. Their anal fins have only 3 spines and between 21 and 23 rays. Their caudal fins are roughly emarginate, and the surgeonfish's body and head are both deep and compressed.

== Distribution and habitat ==
Acanthurus bahianus inhabit coral reefs, where they feed on algae. In the southern and central Atlantic, the Ocean surgeon can be found along the coast of Brazil from the states of Maranhão, south to Santa Catarina. This range includes many islands such as Fernando de Noronha, Atol das Rocas, Trindade, Ascension Island, and St. Helena.
