= Acanthurus randalli =

Conservation status
- Least Concern (IUCN 3.1)

Scientific classification
- Kingdom: Animalia
- Phylum: Chordata
- Class: Actinopterygii
- Order: Acanthuriformes
- Family: Acanthuridae
- Genus: Acanthurus
- Species: A. randalli

Binomial name
- Acanthurus randalli Briggs & D. K. Caldwell, 1957

Species of fish

Acanthurus randalli is a tropical fish found in the western Atlantic ocean. It was first named by Briggs and Caldwell in 1957, and is commonly known as the Gulf surgeonfish. This taxon is treated as a synonyms of the ocean surgeonfish (Acanthurus tractus) by some authorities.
