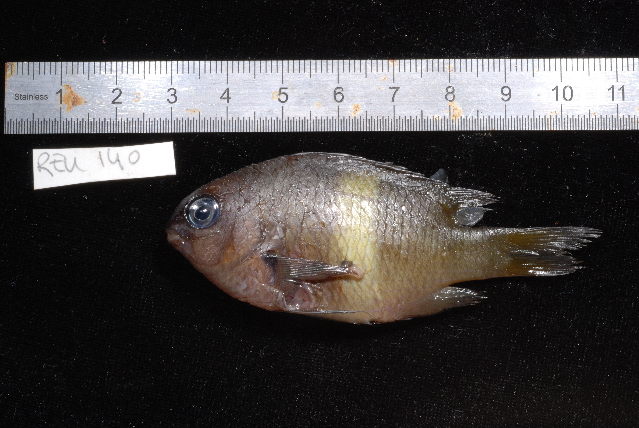

Scientific classification
- Domain: Eukaryota
- Kingdom: Animalia
- Phylum: Chordata
- Class: Actinopterygii
- Order: Blenniiformes
- Family: Pomacentridae
- Genus: Plectroglyphidodon
- Species: P. randalli

Binomial name
- Plectroglyphidodon randalli Allen, 1991

= Plectroglyphidodon randalli =

Species of Actinopterygii

Plectroglyphidodon randalli is a species of Perciformes in the family Pomacentridae.
