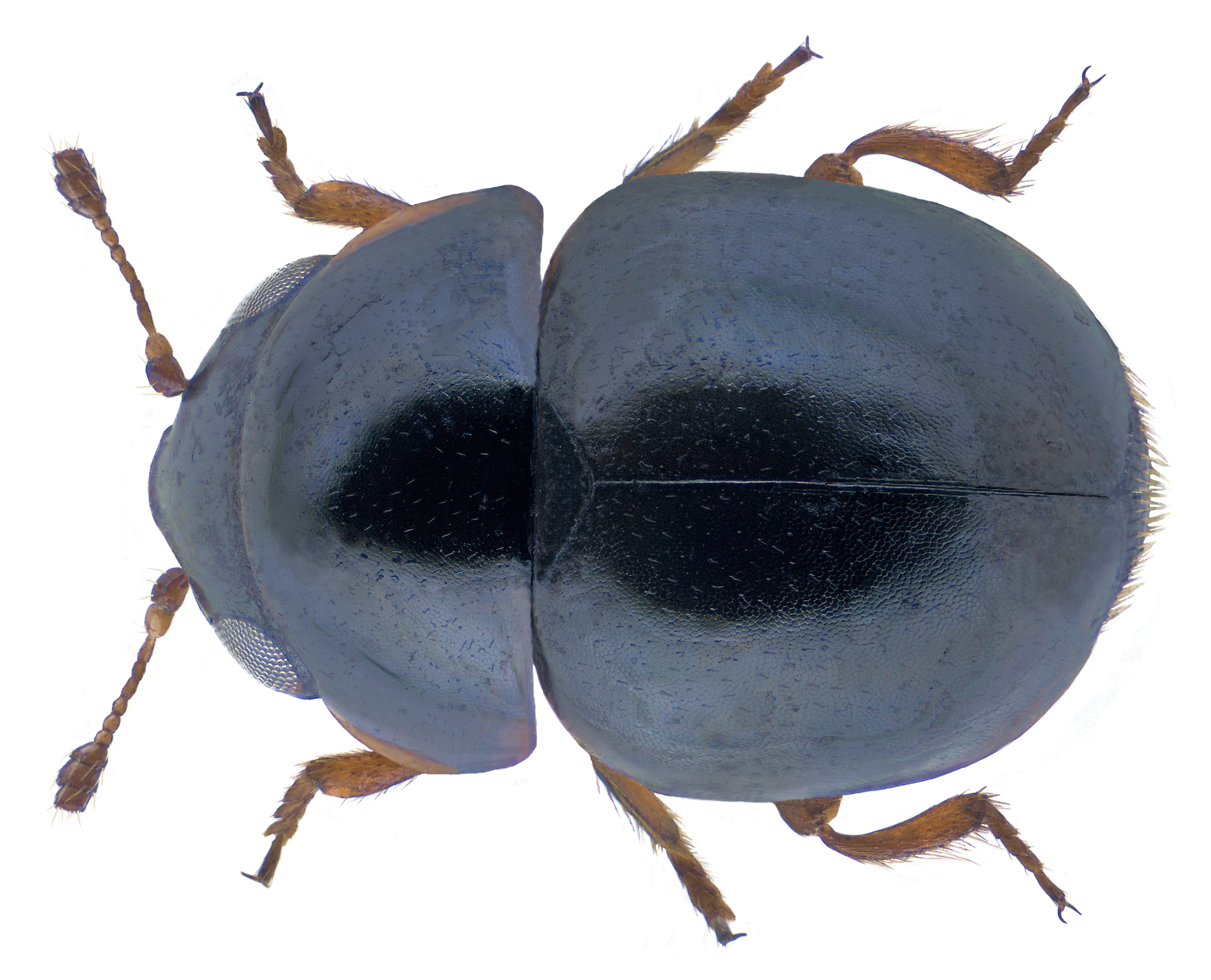
- Cybocephalus fodori

Scientific classification
- Kingdom: Animalia
- Phylum: Arthropoda
- Class: Insecta
- Order: Coleoptera
- Suborder: Polyphaga
- Infraorder: Cucujiformia
- Superfamily: Cucujoidea
- Family: Cybocephalidae; Jacquelin du Val, 1858

= Cybocephalidae =

Cybocephalidae Temporal range: Eocene–Recent

Family of beetles

Cybocephalidae is a family of sap, bark and fungus beetles in the order Coleoptera with a wide global distribution. The type genus Cybocephalus has more than 200 species in it and the entire family has about 220 species in all. Many species are predators of armoured scale insects (Diaspididae). There are four tarsal segments on all the legs. The body is only slightly longer than wide and very convex and shiny. They are small and about 1 to 3 mm long. The insect can roll into a ball like position with its downward facing head. The tarsomeres are lobed underneath. The family is sometimes treated as a subfamily within the Nitidulidae.

== Genera ==
Cybocephalidae contains the following genera:

- Amedissia Kirejtshuk & Mantič, 2015 – Central and South America
- Apastillus Kirejtshuk & Mantič, 2015 – Japan
- Conglobatus T. R. Smith, 2020 – Central America, South America and the West Indies.
- Cybocephalus Erichson, 1844 – Worldwide
- Endrodiellus Enrödy-Younga, 1962 – Madagascar
- Eupastillus Lawrence, 2019 – Australia
- Hierronius Enrödy-Younga, 1968 – Madeira and Canary Islands
- Horadion Enrödy-Younga, 1976 – Eastern Africa and southern Asia
- Microthomas T. R. Smith, 2020 – Bolivia
- Pacicephalus Kirejtshuk & Mantič, 2015 – Micronesia
- †Pastillocenicus Kirejtshuk & Nel, 2008 – French Eocene amber
- Pastillodes Enrödy-Younga, 1968 – Northern Africa
- Pastillus Enrödy-Younga, 1962 – Tropical and southern Africa
- Pycnocephalus Sharp, 1891 – Mexico, Central America and South America
- Taxicephomerus Kirejtshuk, 1994 – Vietnam
- Theticephalus Kirejtshuk, 1988 – Northern Africa, Middle East and Central Asia
