= Chaetoderma =

Chaetoderma can refer to:

- Chaetoderma (fish), a synonym for Chaetodermis, see Chaetodermis penicilligerus
- Chaetoderma (fungus), a genus of Agaricomycetes fungi
- Chaetoderma (mollusc), a genus of caudofoveate molluscs
