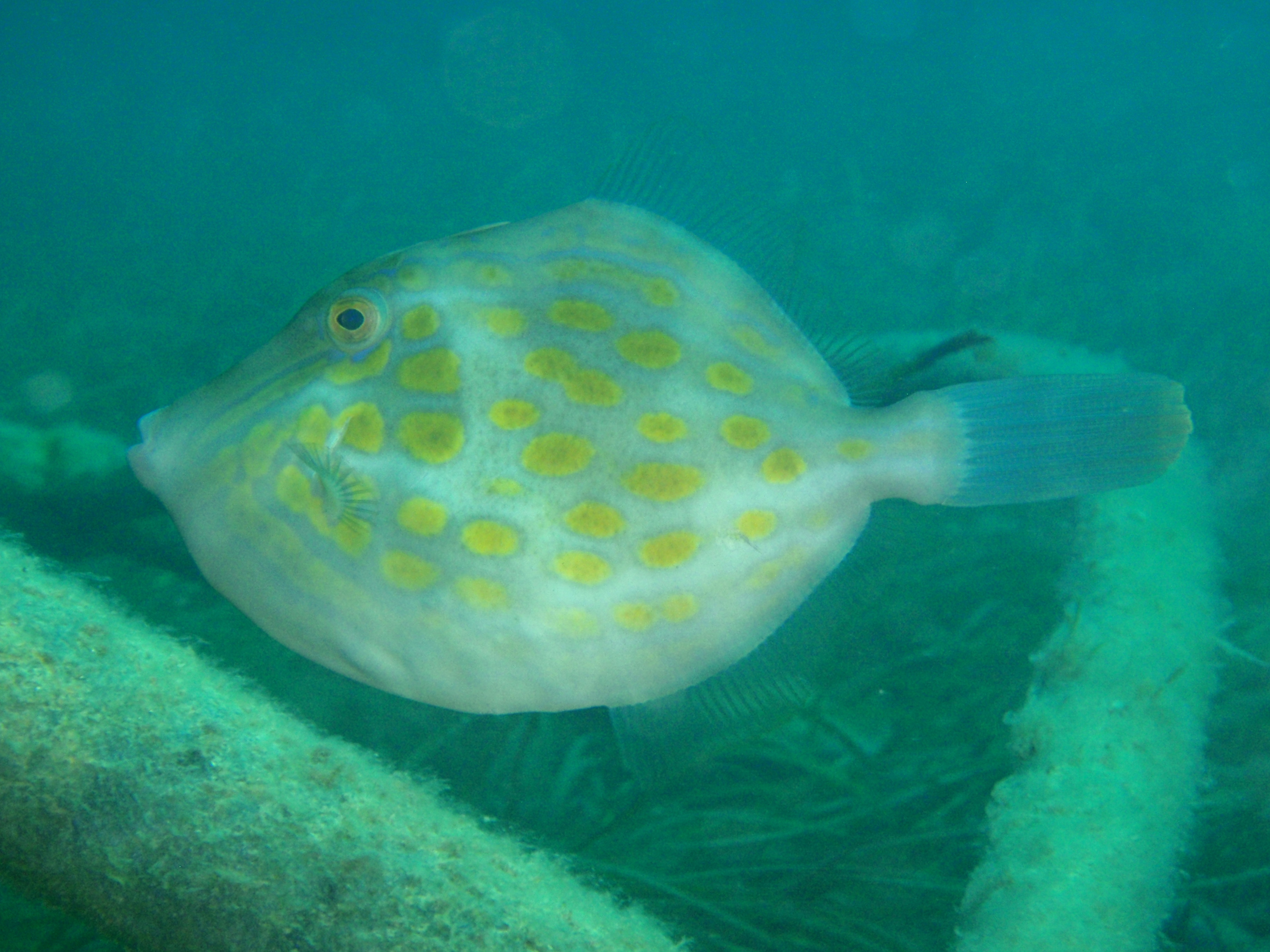
- Eubalichthys mosaicus

Scientific classification
- Kingdom: Animalia
- Phylum: Chordata
- Class: Actinopterygii
- Order: Tetraodontiformes
- Family: Monacanthidae
- Genus: Eubalichthys; Whitley, 1930

= Eubalichthys =

Genus of fishes

Eubalichthys is a genus of filefishes found in the eastern Indian Ocean waters around Australia.

== Species ==
There are currently 6 recognized species in this genus:

- Eubalichthys bucephalus Whitley, 1931 (Black reef leatherjacket)
- Eubalichthys caeruleoguttatus Hutchins, 1977 (Blue-spotted leatherjacket)
- Eubalichthys cyanoura Hutchins, 1987 (Bluetail leatherjacket)
- Eubalichthys gunnii Günther, 1870 (Gunn's leatherjacket)
- Eubalichthys mosaicus E. P. Ramsay & J. D. Ogilby, 1886 (Mosaic leatherjacket)
- Eubalichthys quadrispinis Hutchins, 1977 (Four-spined leatherjacket)
