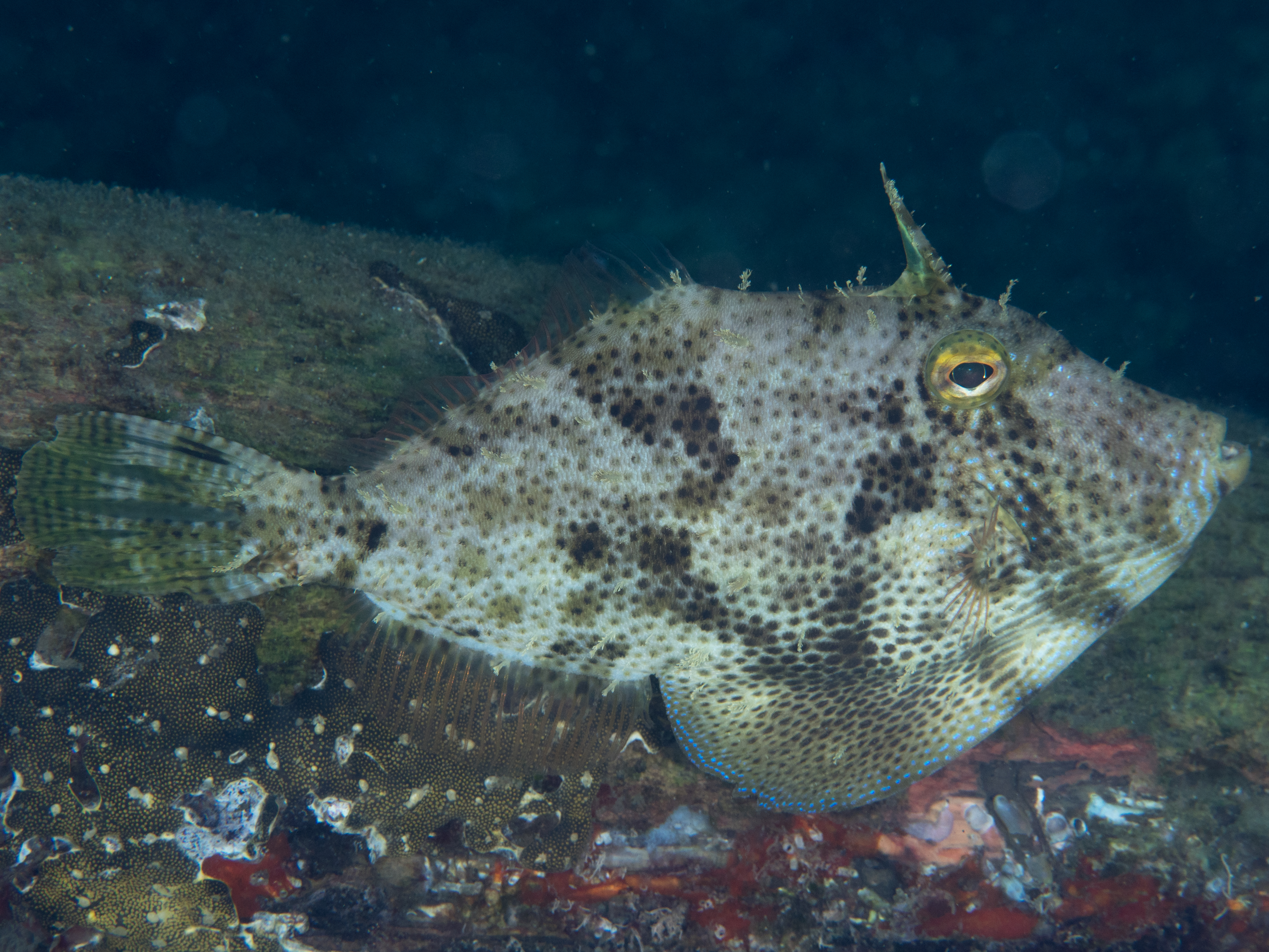

Scientific classification
- Kingdom: Animalia
- Phylum: Chordata
- Class: Actinopterygii
- Order: Tetraodontiformes
- Family: Monacanthidae
- Genus: Pseudomonacanthus
- Species: P. macrurus

Binomial name
- Pseudomonacanthus macrurus Bleeker, 1857

= Pseudomonacanthus macrurus =

Strap-weed filefish

Species of fish

Pseudomonacanthus macrurus (strap-weed filefish), is a filefish of the family Monacanthidae. It reaches a maximum length of 18 cm.

Strap-weed filefish are often found in pairs and inhabit shallow coastal algal reefs and estuaries across the Indian and Pacific oceans.
