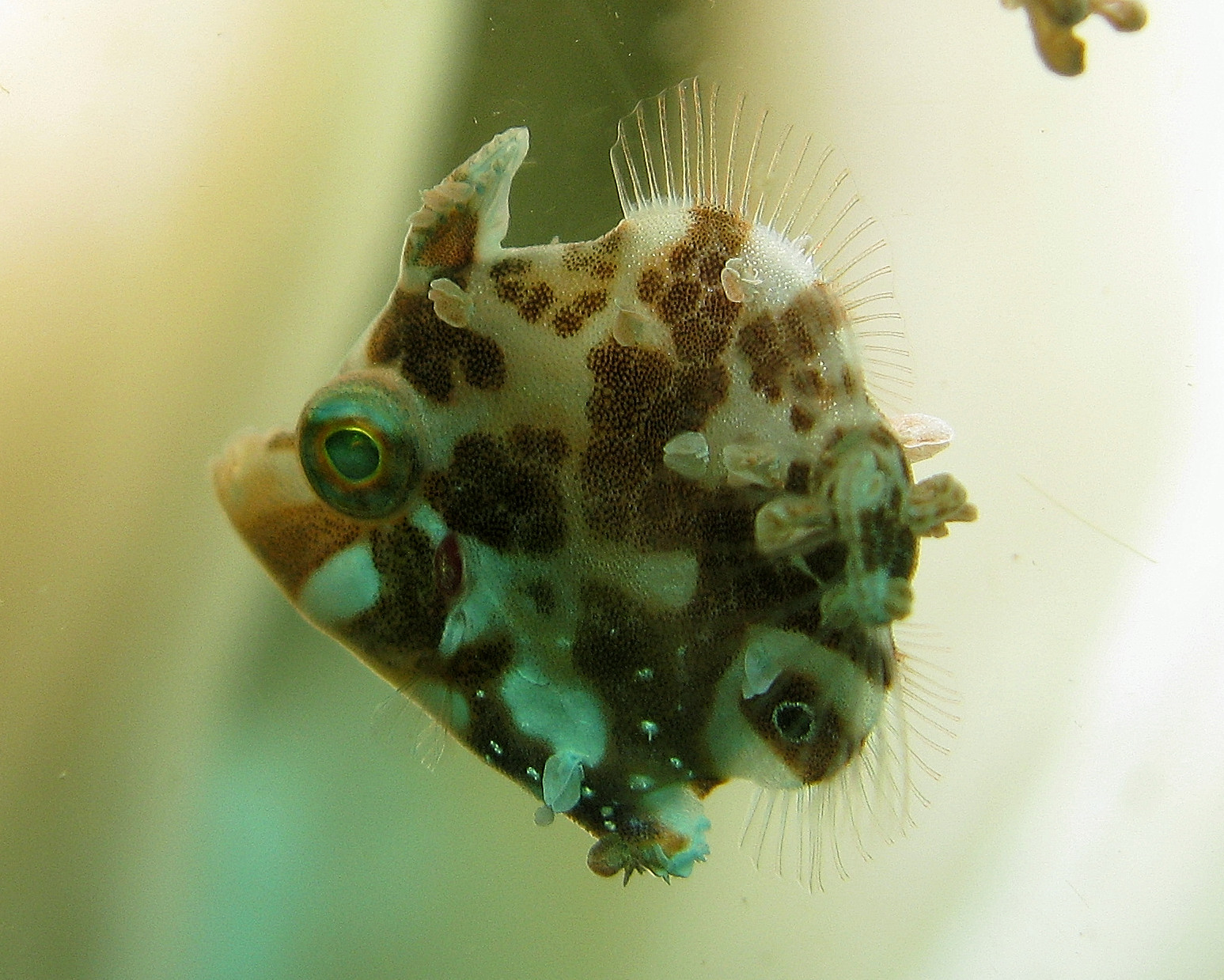
- Rudarius minutus

Scientific classification
- Kingdom: Animalia
- Phylum: Chordata
- Class: Actinopterygii
- Order: Tetraodontiformes
- Family: Monacanthidae
- Genus: Rudarius; D. S. Jordan & Fowler, 1902

= Rudarius =

Genus of fishes

Rudarius is a genus of filefishes native to the western Pacific Ocean.

== Species ==
The currently recognized species in this genus are:

- Rudarius ercodes D. S. Jordan & Fowler, 1902 (white-spotted pygmy filefish)
- Rudarius excelsus Hutchins, 1977 (diamond leatherjacket)
- Rudarius minutus J. C. Tyler, 1970 (minute leatherjacket)
