= Colurodontis =

Conservation status
- Data Deficient (IUCN 3.1)

Scientific classification
- Kingdom: Animalia
- Phylum: Chordata
- Class: Actinopterygii
- Order: Tetraodontiformes
- Family: Monacanthidae
- Genus: Colurodontis; Hutchins, 1977
- Species: C. paxmani

Binomial name
- Colurodontis paxmani Hutchins, 1977

Species of fish

Colurodontis paxmani is a species of filefish endemic to Australia. This species grows to a length of 12 centimetres (4.7 in) SL. This species is the only known member of the genus Colurodontis. Juvenile Colurodontis paxmani have been observed associating with floating Sargassum rafts, where it derives part of its diet from the raft-associated food web.
