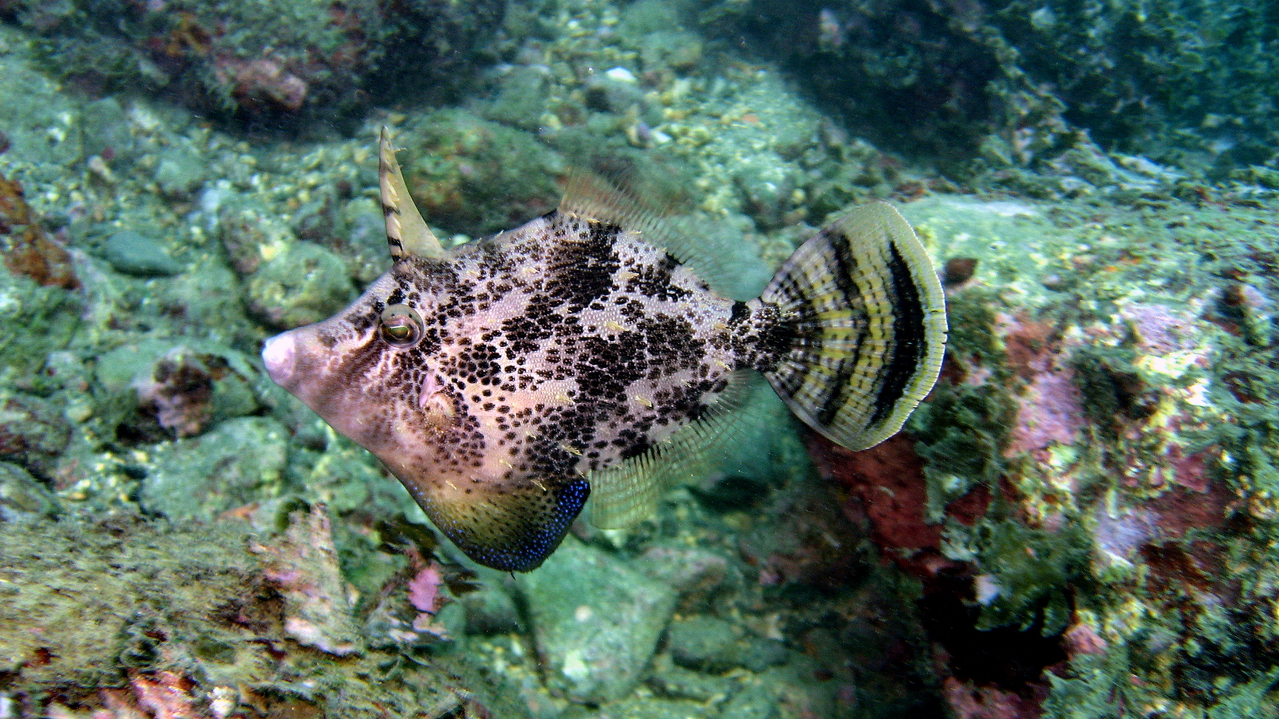
- Fan-bellied leatherjacket (Monacanthus chinensis)
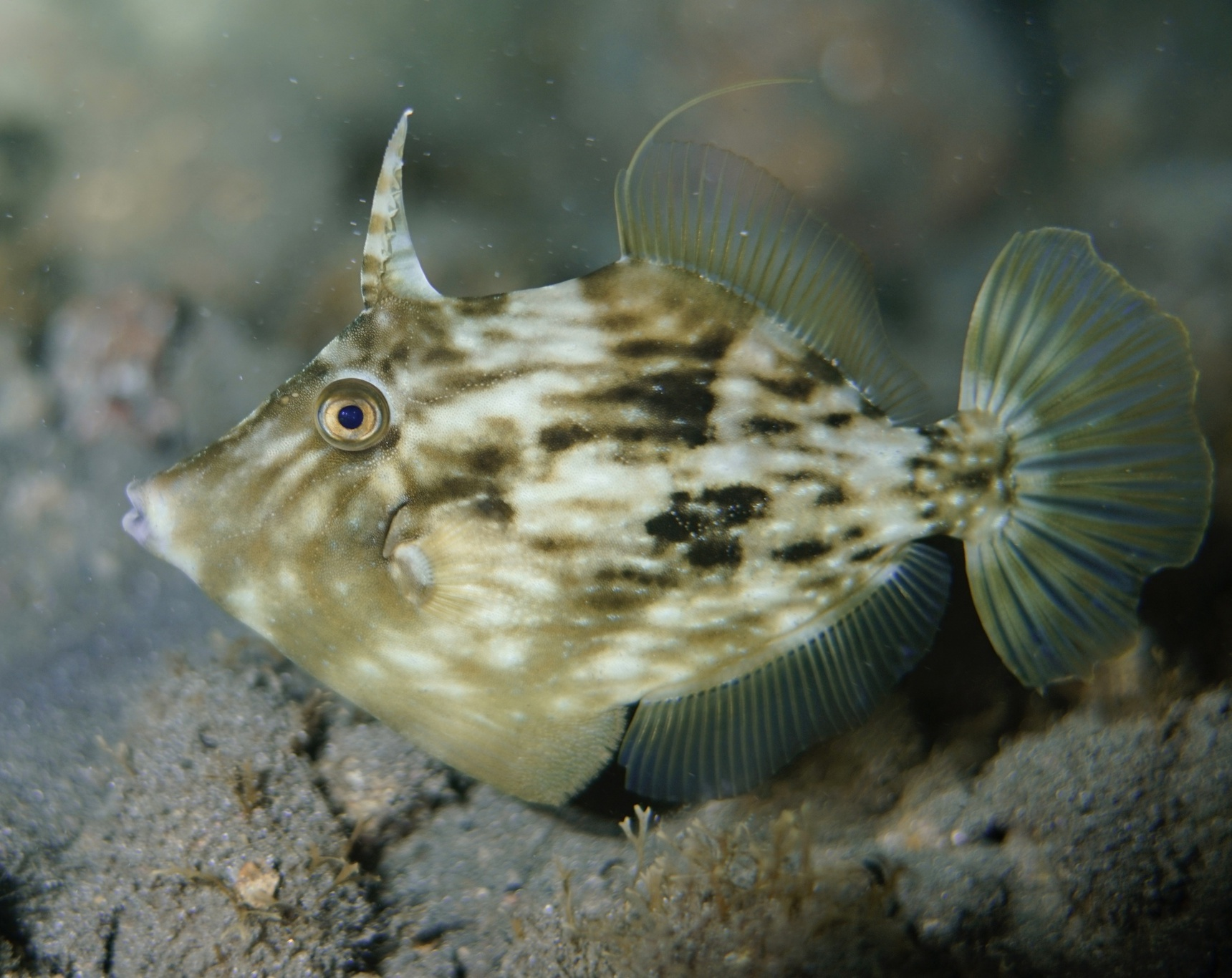
- Stephanolepis hispidus

Scientific classification
- Kingdom: Animalia
- Phylum: Chordata
- Class: Actinopterygii
- Division: Teleostei
- Order: Tetraodontiformes
- Suborder: Balistoidei
- Family: Monacanthidae; Nardo, 1843

Genera
- see text

= Filefish =

Filefish Temporal range: Late Eocene–Present

Family of fishes

The filefish (Monacanthidae) are a diverse family of tropical to subtropical tetraodontiform marine fish, which are also known as foolfish, leatherjackets, or shingles. They live in the Atlantic, Pacific, and Indian Oceans. Filefish are closely related to triggerfish, pufferfish, and trunkfish. Their rough skin lead to their common name, alluding to the file.

The filefish family comprises about 102 species in 27 genera. More than half of the species are found in Australian waters, with 58 species in 23 genera.

== Description ==
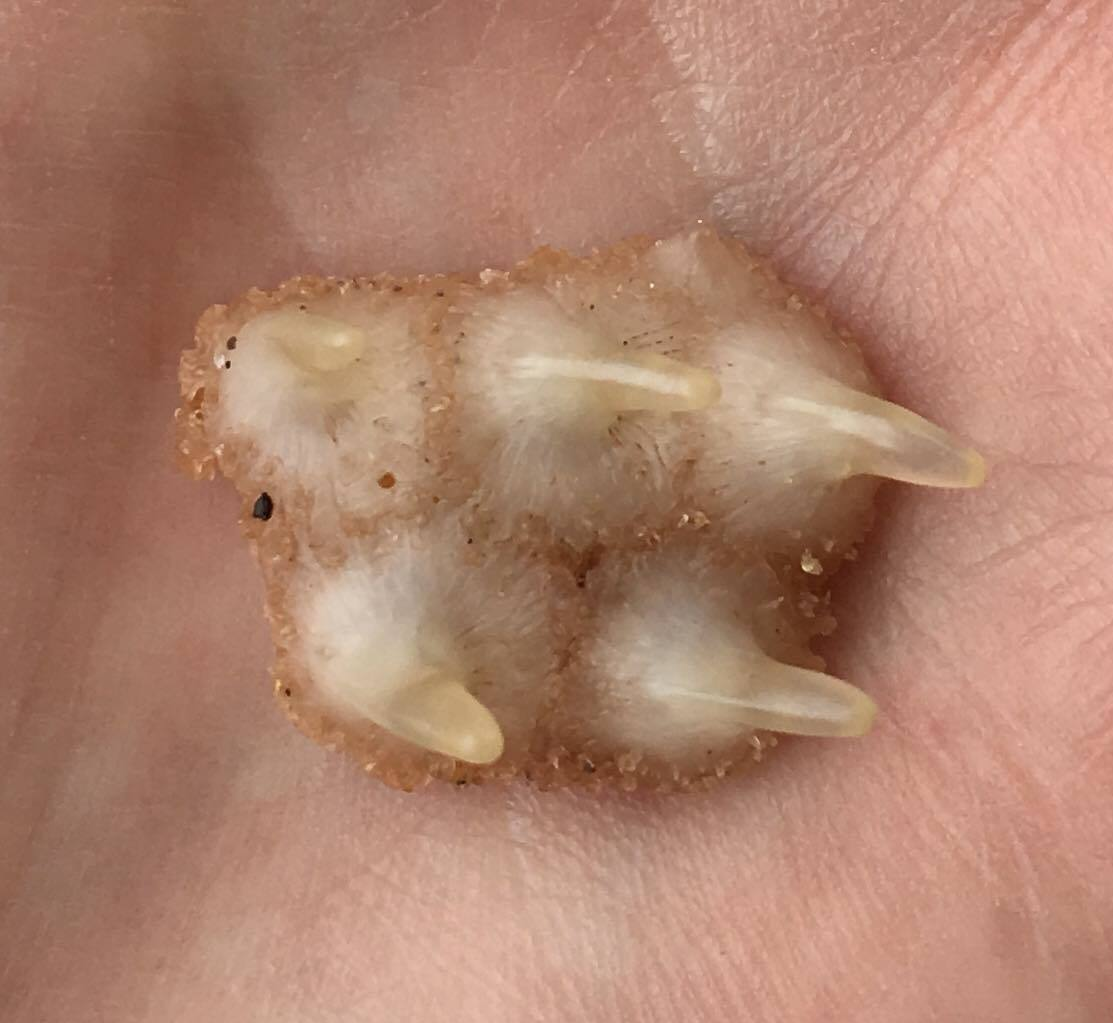
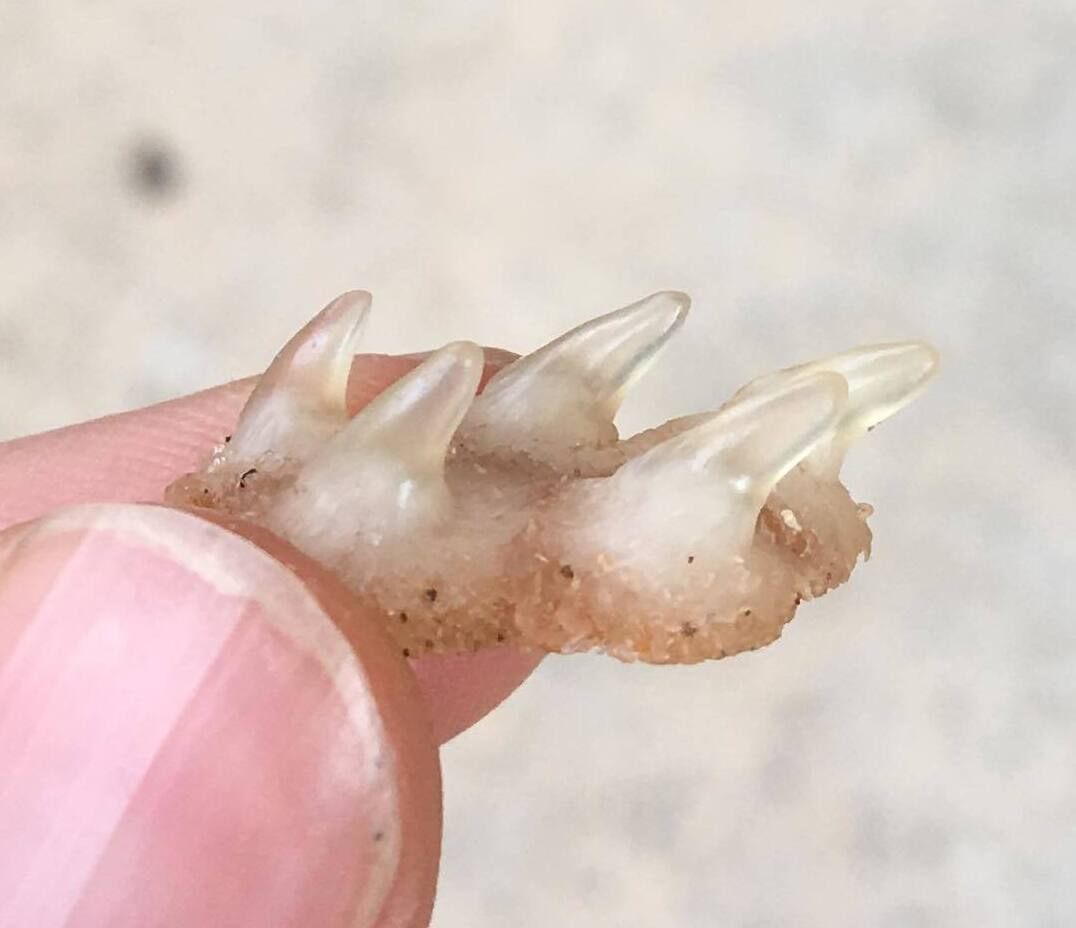
Meuschenia caudal spines

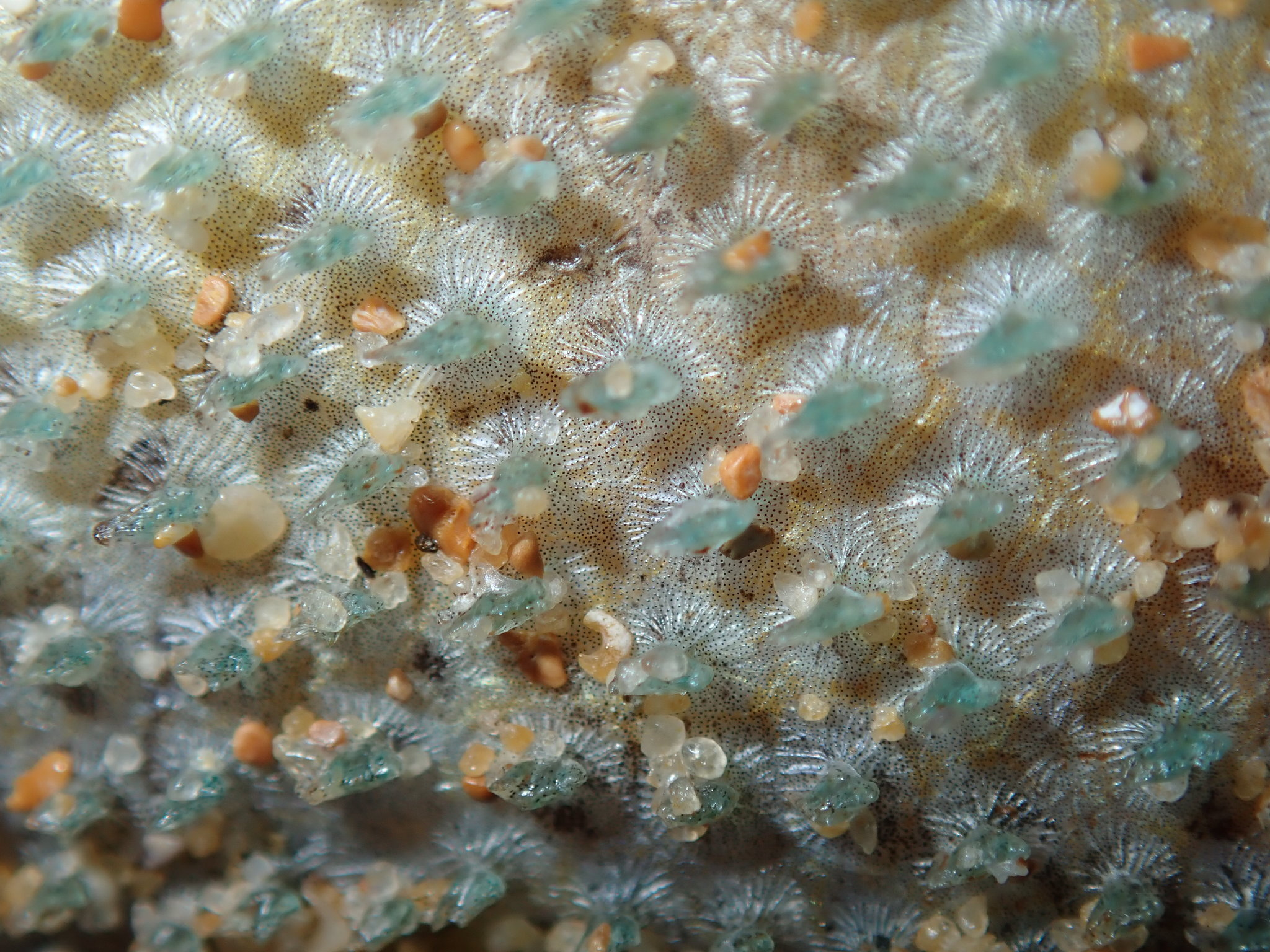
Close up of the skin of Scobinichthys granulatus

Filefish are generally rhomboid-shaped, with elaborate cryptic patterns; many species resemble the closely related triggerfish. Deeply keeled bodies give a false impression of size when the fish are viewed facing the flanks. Filefish have soft, simple fins, with comparatively small pectoral fins and truncated, fan-shaped tail fins; a slender, retractable spine crowns the head. Although usually two of these spines occur, the second spine is greatly reduced, being used only to lock the first spine in the erect position. That gives rise to the family name Monacanthidae, from the Greek monos meaning "one" and akantha meaning "thorn". Some species also have recurved spines on the base of the tail (caudal peduncle).

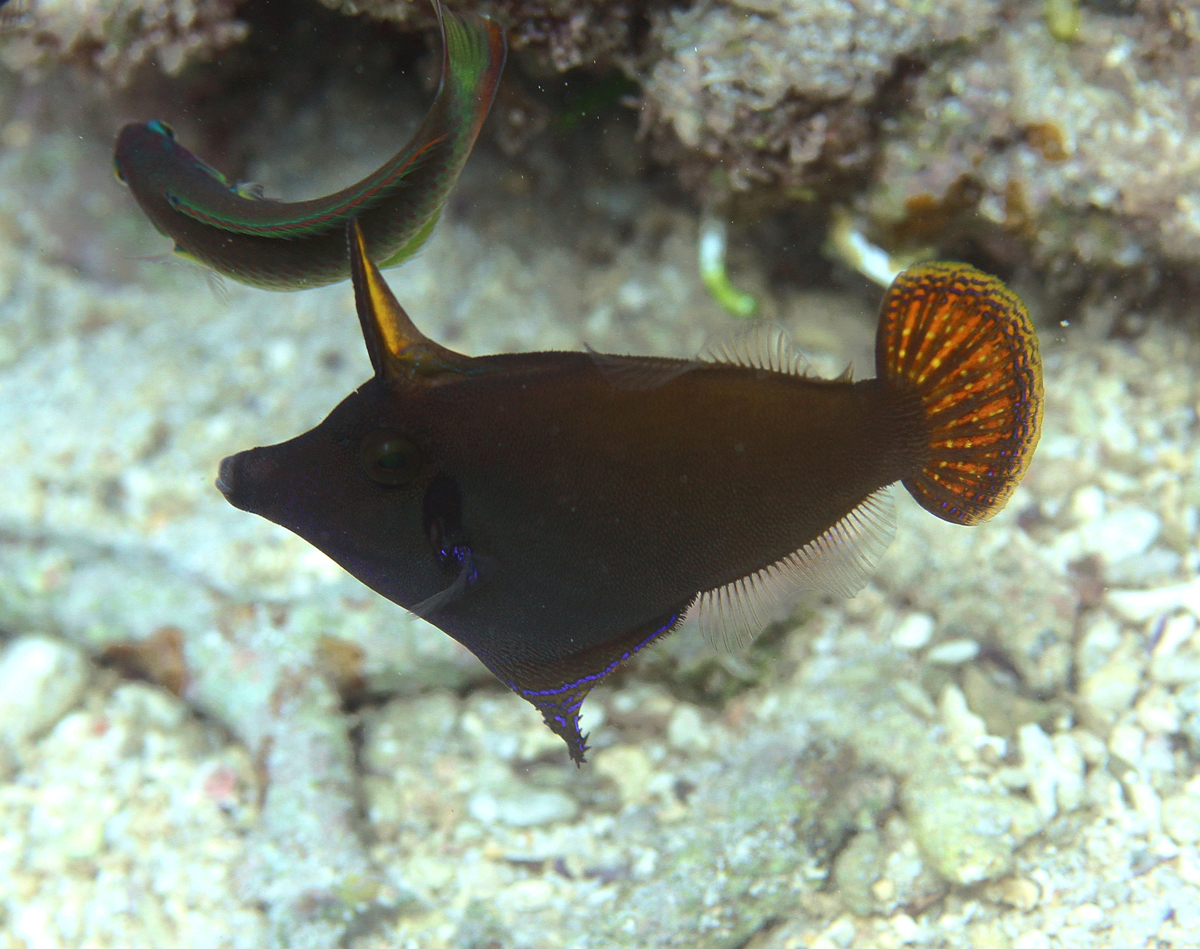
Pervagor janthinosoma showing fully erect dorsal and pelvic spines

The small terminal mouths of filefish have specialized incisor teeth on the upper and lower jaws. The upper jaw has four teeth in the inner series and six in the outer series. The lower jaw has four to six in an outer series only. The snout is tapered and projecting, and the eyes are located high on the head. Filefish have rough non-overlapping scales with small spikes, which is why they are called filefish. Although scaled, some filefish have such small scales that they appear scaleless. Like the triggerfish, filefish have small gill openings and greatly elongated pelvic bones, creating a "dewlap" of skin running between the bone's sharply keeled termination and the belly. The pelvis is articulated with other bones of the "pelvic girdle" and is capable of moving upwards and downwards in many species to form a large dewlap, which is used to make the fish appear much deeper in the body than is actually the case. Some filefish erect their dorsal spine and pelvis simultaneously to make removing them from a cave more difficult for predators.

The largest filefish species is the scrawled filefish (Aluterus scriptus) at up to 110 cm (43 in) in length. Most species are less than 60 cm (24 in) in length. Marked sexual dimorphism is seen in some species, with the sexes possessing different coloration, different body shapes; the males have larger caudal spines and bristles than females.

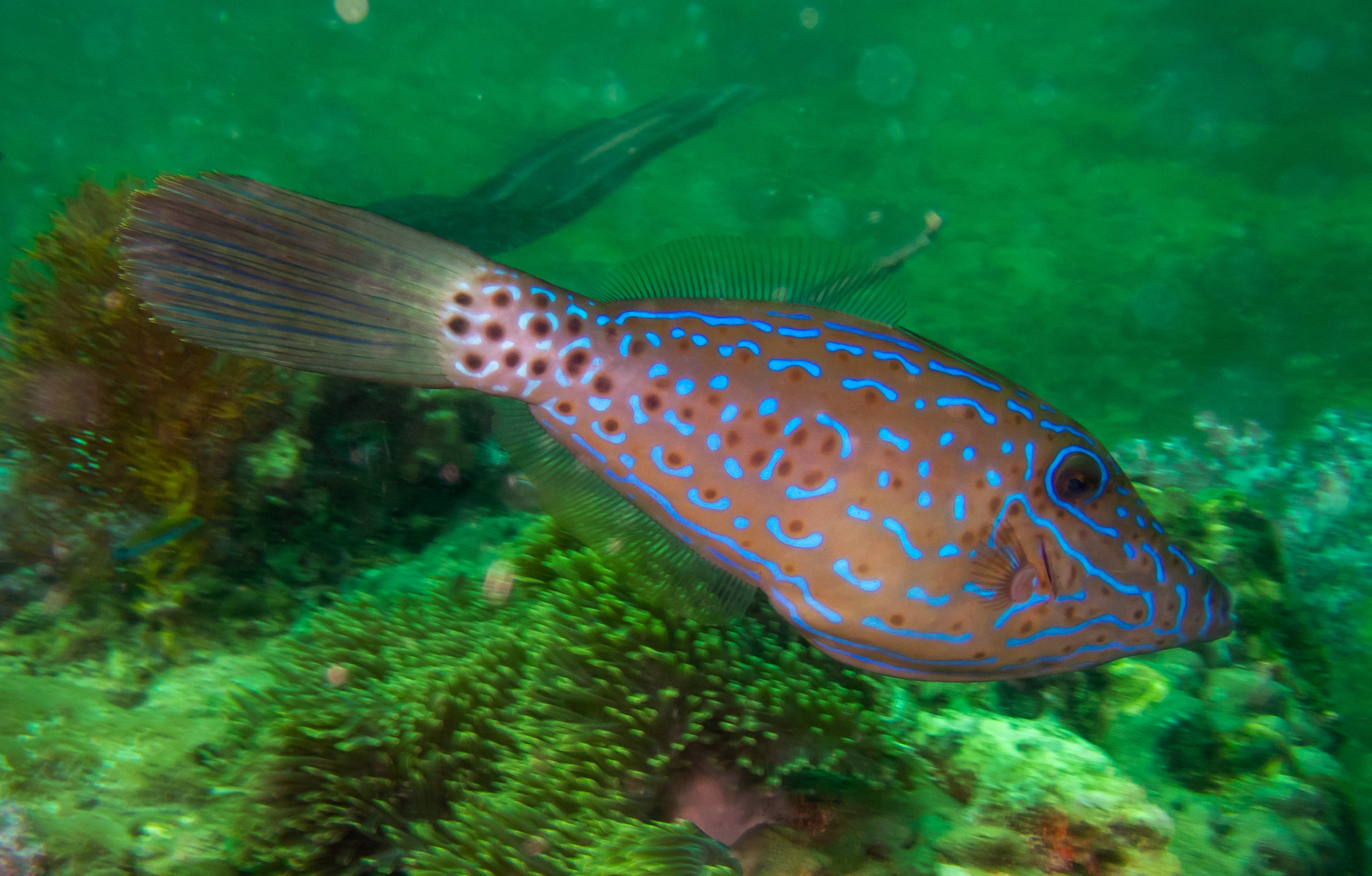
Aluterus scriptus grows up to 110 cm (43 in) in length

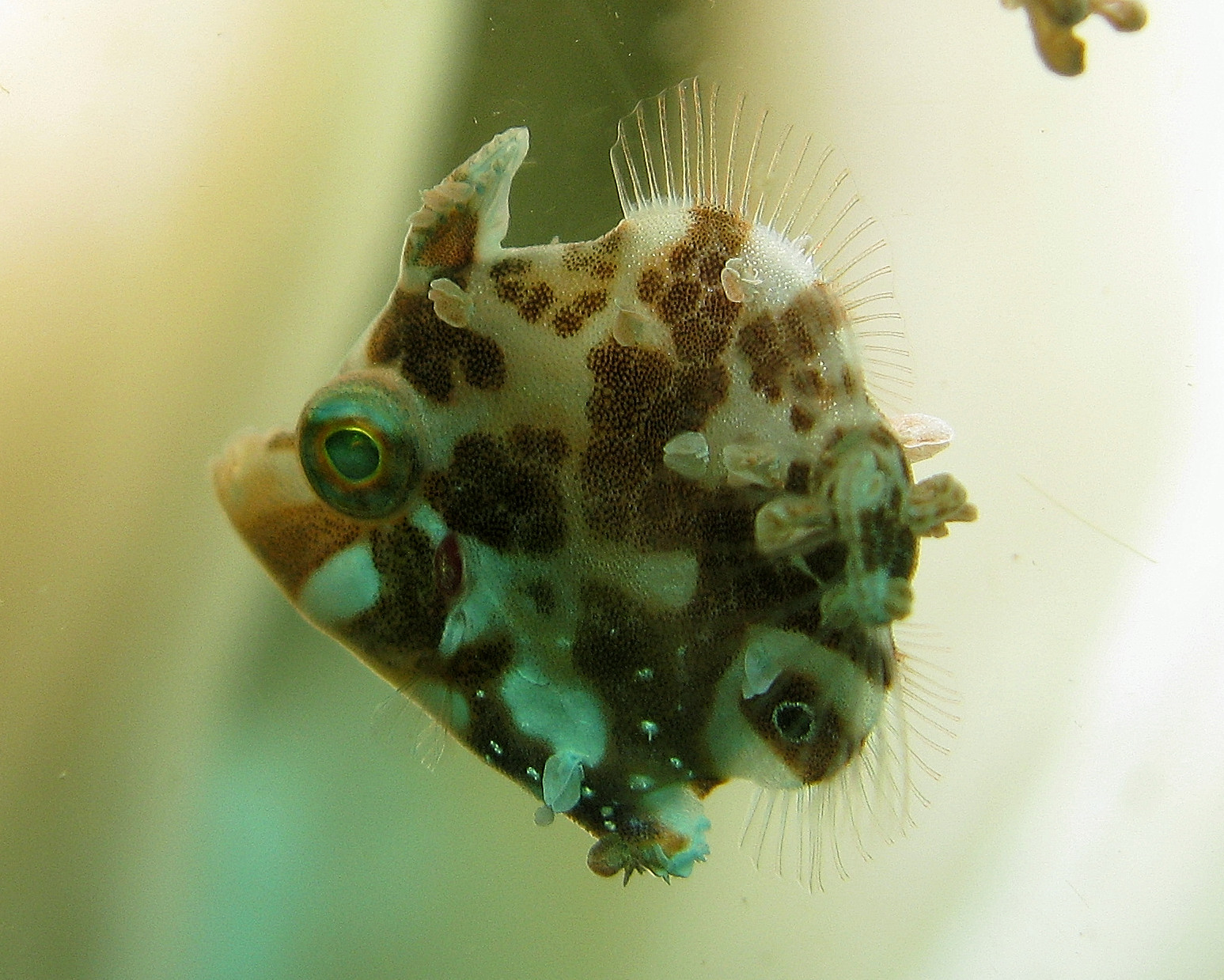
Rudarius minutus reaches adulthood when only 2 cm long

The family is known for rapid color changes; multiple species have been observed to shift their patterns from muted to intense patterns in seconds. This rapid color change is known as a physiological color change, resulting from a dispersion of pigments within chromatophores (metachrosis). The shift is often for camouflage, but also when exposed to stimulus; in Stephanolepis cirrhifer this shift is related to social dominance, with dominant individuals in combat displaying the most intense patterns, and subordinate individuals displaying no pattern at all. Frightened dominants also display a lack of pattern. A similar behavior is seen in Rudarius ercodes. Monacanthus tuckeri is able to quickly adapt to varying backgrounds, adapting its patterns to macroalgal, soft coral, or barren backgrounds. Its camouflage is often enhanced by a head-down swimming posture (often adopted by various filefish species) as well as dermal flaps which disrupt the animal's outline. This combination of factors results in a fish that is visually hard to detect, and when located its outline is not immediately recognizable as "fishlike". In contrast, the general coloration of the fish may take longer to change; brown Monacanthus chinensis needed around 21 days to shift towards a green background color.

== Taxonomy ==
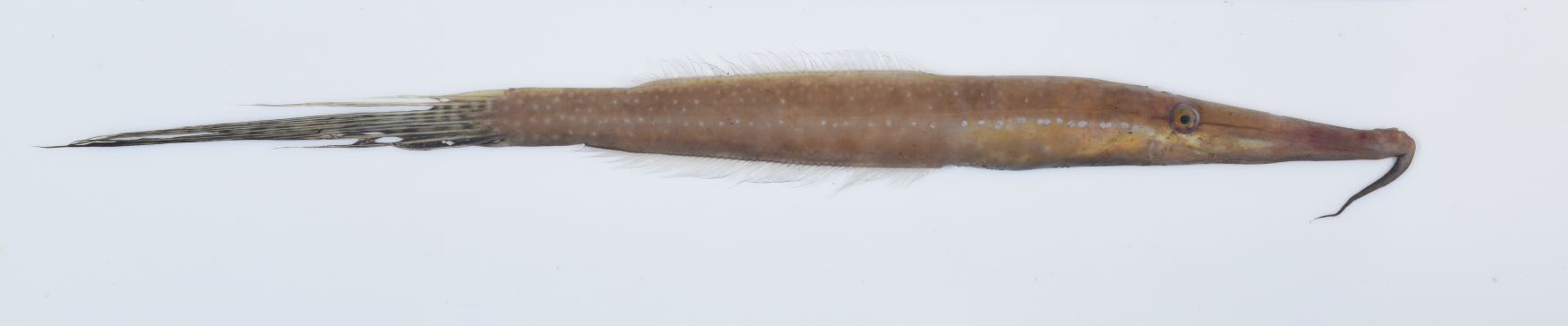
Anacanthus barbatus is uniquely elongated

Phylogenetic studies have consistently found that the triggerfishes (Balistidae) are the sister group to the filefishes (Monacanthidae), diverging from each other during the Middle Eocene. Although the two groups share many physical similarities, filefishes are more ecologically diverse than triggerfishes, and have more than double the species richness. Filefishes also show greater diversity in body shape and size. This may be because of the Late Eocene origin of crown monacanthids, compared to the late Miocene origin of crown balistids.

=== Genera ===
- Acanthaluteres
- Acreichthys
- Aluterus
- Amanses
- Anacanthus
- Arotrolepis
- Brachaluteres
- Cantherhines
- Cantheschenia
- Chaetodermis
- Colurodontis
- Enigmacanthus
- Eubalichthys
- †Frigocanthus
- Lalmohania
- Meuschenia
- Monacanthus
- Nelusetta
- Oxymonacanthus
- Paraluteres
- Paramonacanthus
- Pervagor
- Pseudalutarius
- Pseudomonacanthus
- Rudarius
- Scobinichthys
- Stephanolepis
- Thamnaconus

The following cladogram is based on a 2016 molecular study of filefish and triggerfish (Balistidae):

- Acanthostracion polygonius
- Balistoidei
  - Balistidae
  - ⊞Monacanthidae
    ⊟
    - - - Aluterus monoceros
        - - Aluterus scriptus
          - - Aluterus heudelotii
            - Aluterus schoepfii
      - - Oxymonacanthus longirostris
        - - - Monacanthus ciliatus
            - Monacanthus tuckeri
          - - Stephanolepis hispidus
            - - Stephanolepis auratus
              - - Stephanolepis cirrhifer
                - Stephanolepis setifer
    - - - - Brachaluteres jacksonianus
          - Paraluteres prionurus
        - - - - Pervagor aspricaudus
              - Pervagor nigrolineatus
            - - Pervagor spilosoma
              - - Pervagor janthinosoma
                - Pervagor melanocephalus
          - - Chaetodermis penicilligerus
            - - Acreichthys tomentosus
              - - Monacanthus chinensis
                - - Paramonacanthus filicaudia
                  - - Paramonacanthus oblongus
                    - - Paramonacanthus choirocephalus
                      - Paramonacanthus sulcatus
      - - - - Pseudomonacanthus macrurus
            - Pseudomonacanthus peroni
          - - - Amanses scopas
              - - Cantherhines dumerilii
                - Cantherhines macrocerus
            - - Cantherhines verecundus
              - - Cantherhines fronticinctus
                - - Cantherhines pullus
                  - - Cantherhines pardalis
                    - Cantherhines sandwichiensis
        - - - Thamnaconus tessellatus
            - - Thamnaconus arenaceus
              - Thamnaconus modestoides
          - - - Eubalichthys mosaicus
              - - Thamnaconus fajardoi
                - Thamnaconus modestus
            - - - Meuschenia trachylepis
                - Nelusetta ayraud
              - - Scobinichthys granulatus
                - - - Acanthaluteres spilomelanurus
                    - Acanthaluteres vittiger
                  - - Meuschenia freycineti
                    - Meuschenia hippocrepis

== Habitat and life history ==
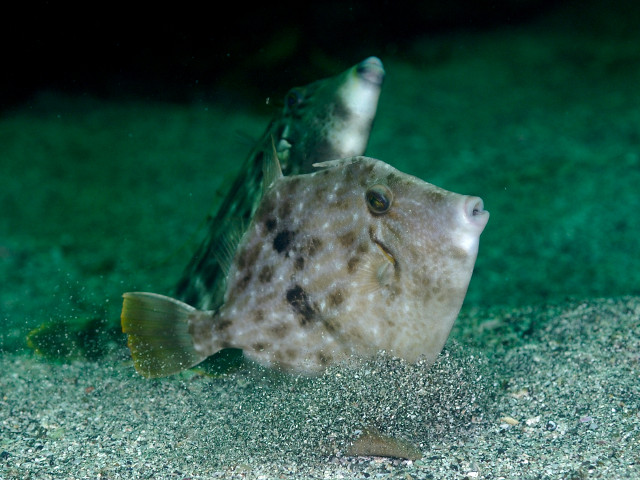
Spawning threadsail filefish

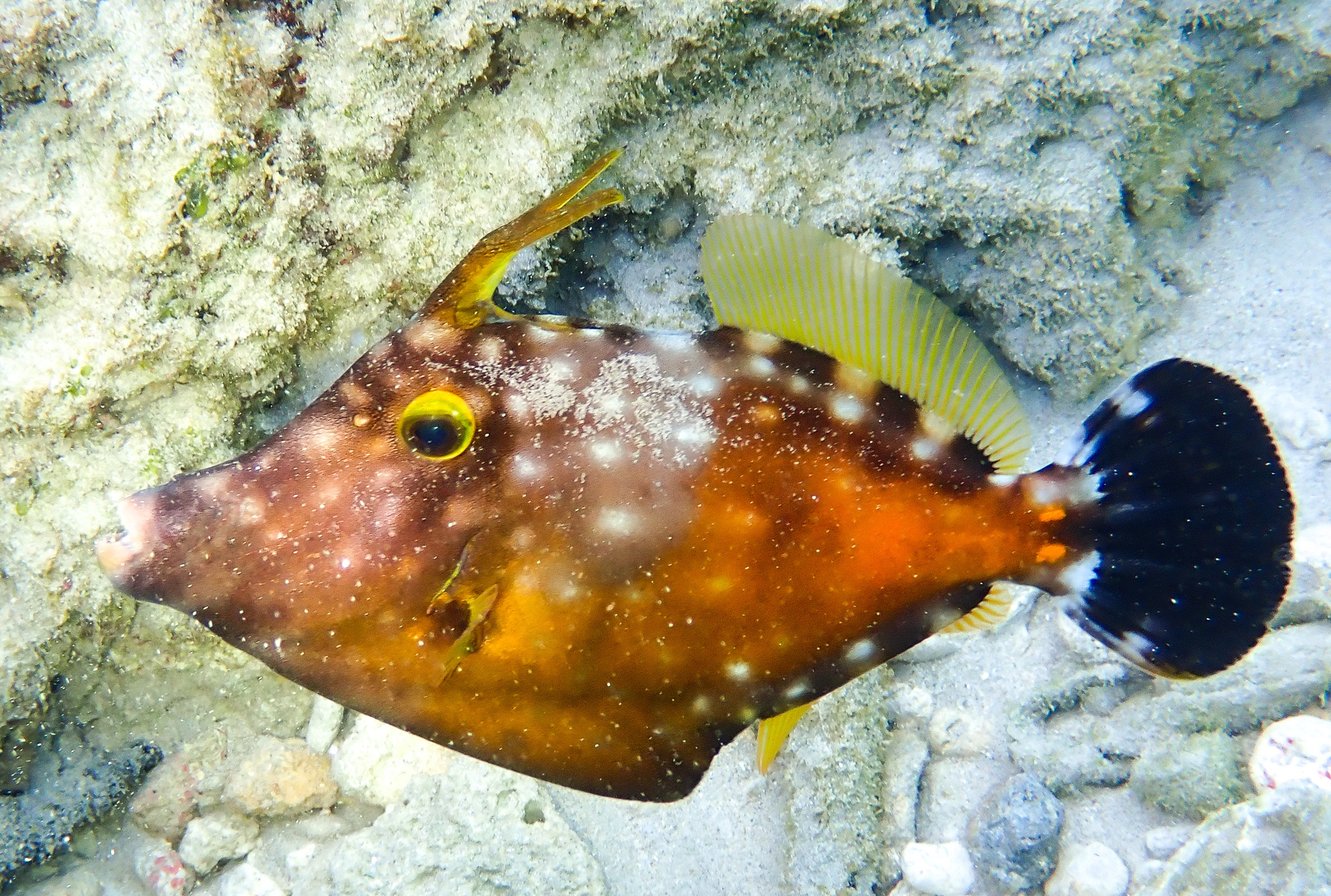
Bifid dorsal spines are an occasionally recorded aberration. Here it is exhibited by Cantherhines macrocerus

The smooth leatherjacket (Meuschenia scaber) has the longest known lifespan amongst monacanthids, and have been recorded living for up to 19 years in the wild.

Adult filefish are generally shallow-water fish, inhabiting depths of no more than about 30 m (100 ft). They may be found in lagoons or associated with seaward reefs and seagrass beds; some species may also enter estuaries. Some species are closely associated with dense mats of Sargassum, a particularly ubiquitous "sea weed"; these filefish, notably the plane head filefish (Stephanolepis hispidus), are also coloured and patterned to match their weedy environments.

Either solitary, in pairs, or small groups depending on the species, filefish are not especially good swimmers; their small fins confine the fish to a sluggish pace. Filefish are often observed drifting head downward amongst stands of seaweed, presumably in an effort to fool both predator and prey alike. When threatened, filefish may retreat into crevices in the reef.

The feeding habits of filefish vary among the species, with some eating only algae and seagrass; others also eat small benthic invertebrates, such as tunicates, gorgonians, and hydrozoans; and some species eat corals (corallivores). The latter two habits have largely precluded the introduction of filefish into the aquarium hobby. Filefish spawn at bottom sites prepared and guarded by the males; both he and the female may guard the brood, or the male alone, depending on the species. The young filefish are pelagic, that is, they frequent open water. Sargassum provides a safe retreat for many species, both fish and weed being at the current's mercy. Juvenile filefish are at risk from predation by tuna and dolphinfish.

== Relation to humans ==
In FAO fisheries statistics, the largest category of filefish are Cantherhines spp. with annual landings around 200,000 tonnes in recent years, mostly by China. Landings of threadsail filefish (Stephanolepis cirrhifer) and smooth leatherjacket (Meuschenia scaber) are reported at species level, with the rest as "Filefishes, leatherjackets nei" (nei = not elsewhere included).

The ocean leatherjacket (Nelusetta ayraudi) is the most harvested filefish species in Australian waters, and the second most valuable species in New South Wales' demersal trap fishery, only behind Australasian snapper (Pagrus auratus).

The unicorn filefish (Aluterus monoceros) was until recently considered bycatch in the trawl fishery. This changed after 2008, when the species suddenly started being caught in high quantities, creating a fishery for the species in the Arabian Sea and Bay of Bengal.

Threadsail filefish (Stephanolepis cirrhifer) is a popular snack food in Korea. It is typically dried and made into a sweet and salty jerky called jwipo (Korean: 쥐포), which is then roasted before eating.

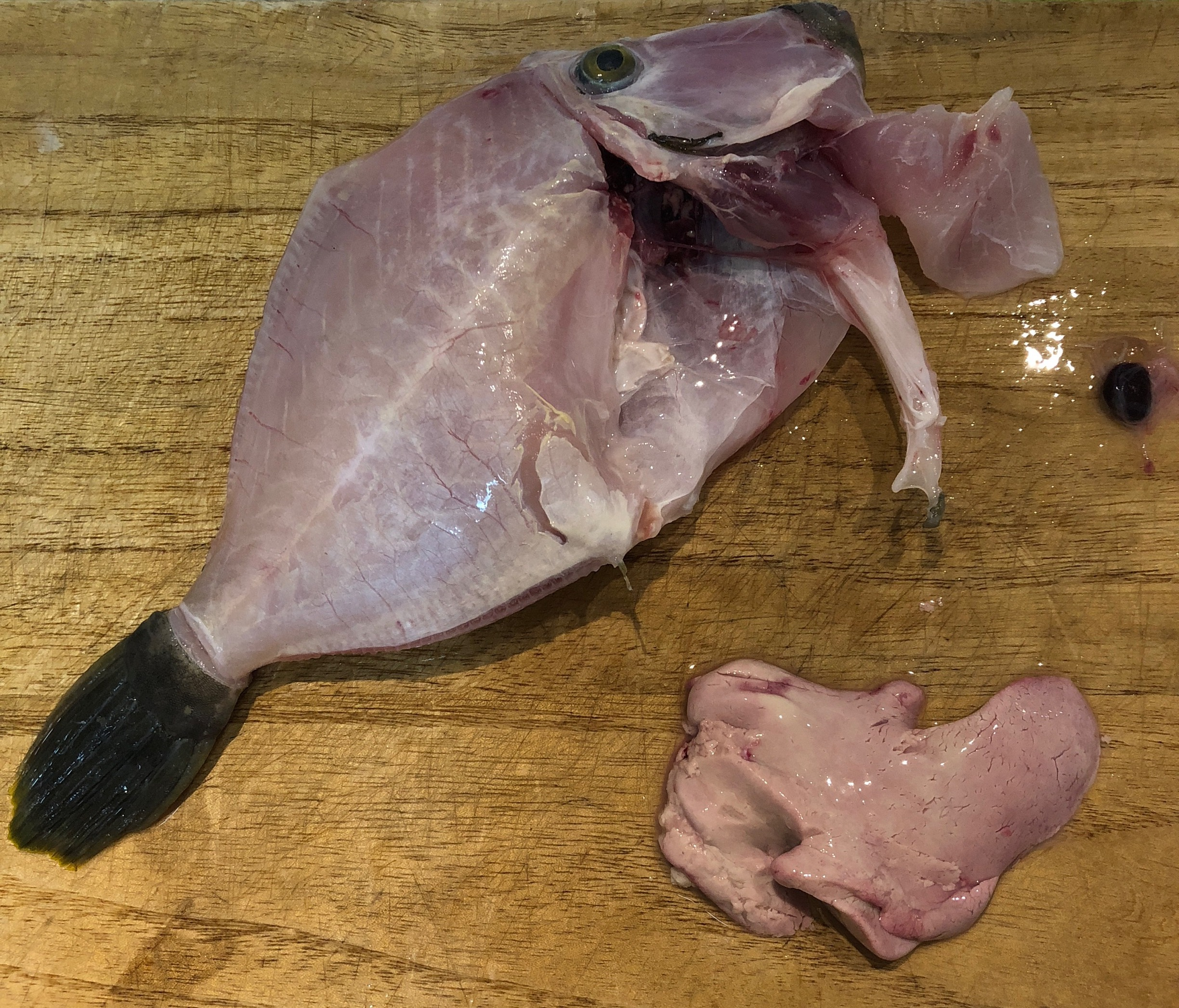
The large liver (bottom right) of Stephanolepis cirrhifer is considered a high-end ingredient in Japan.

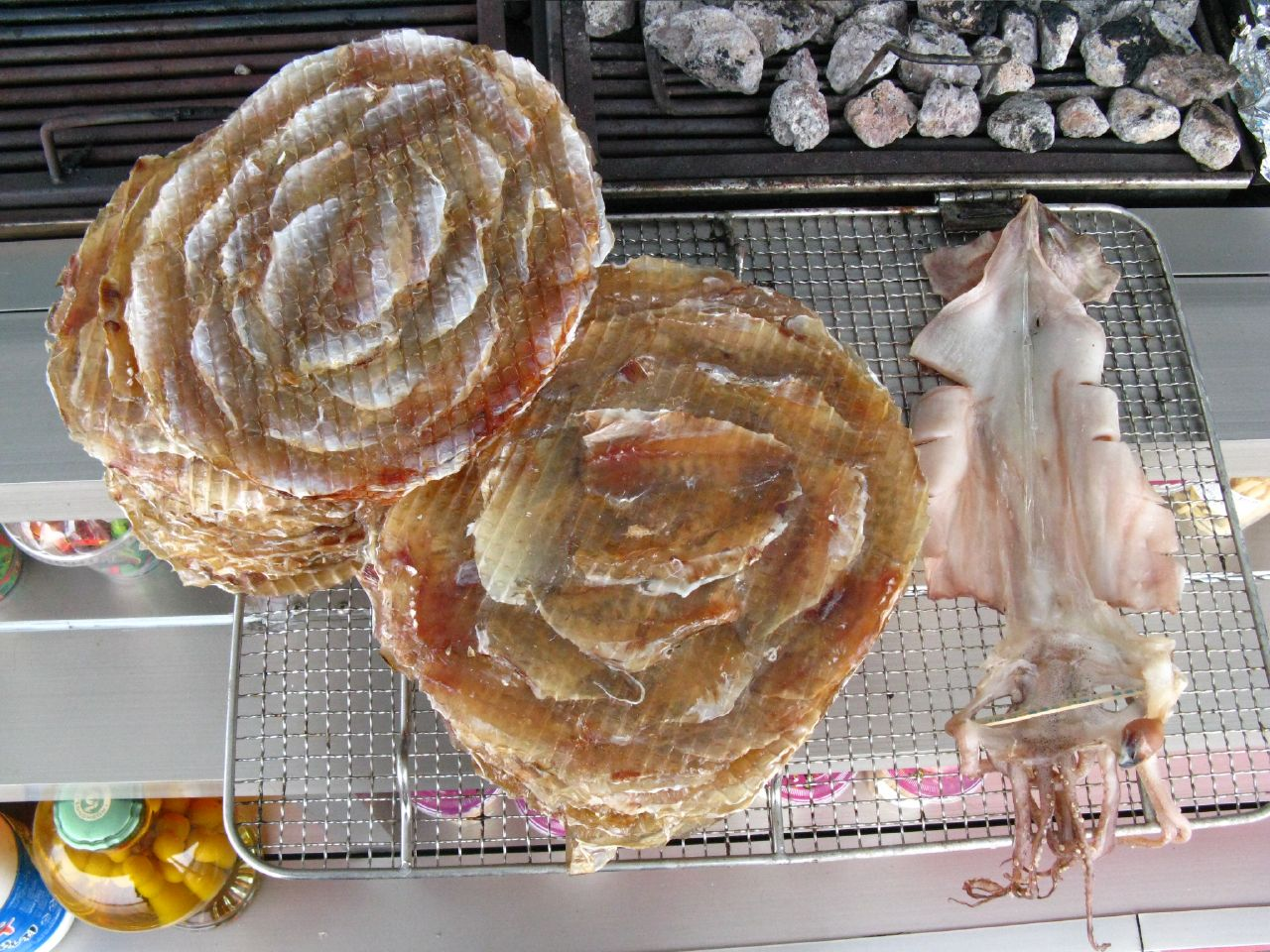
Jwipo (left), Korean dried and flattened filefish

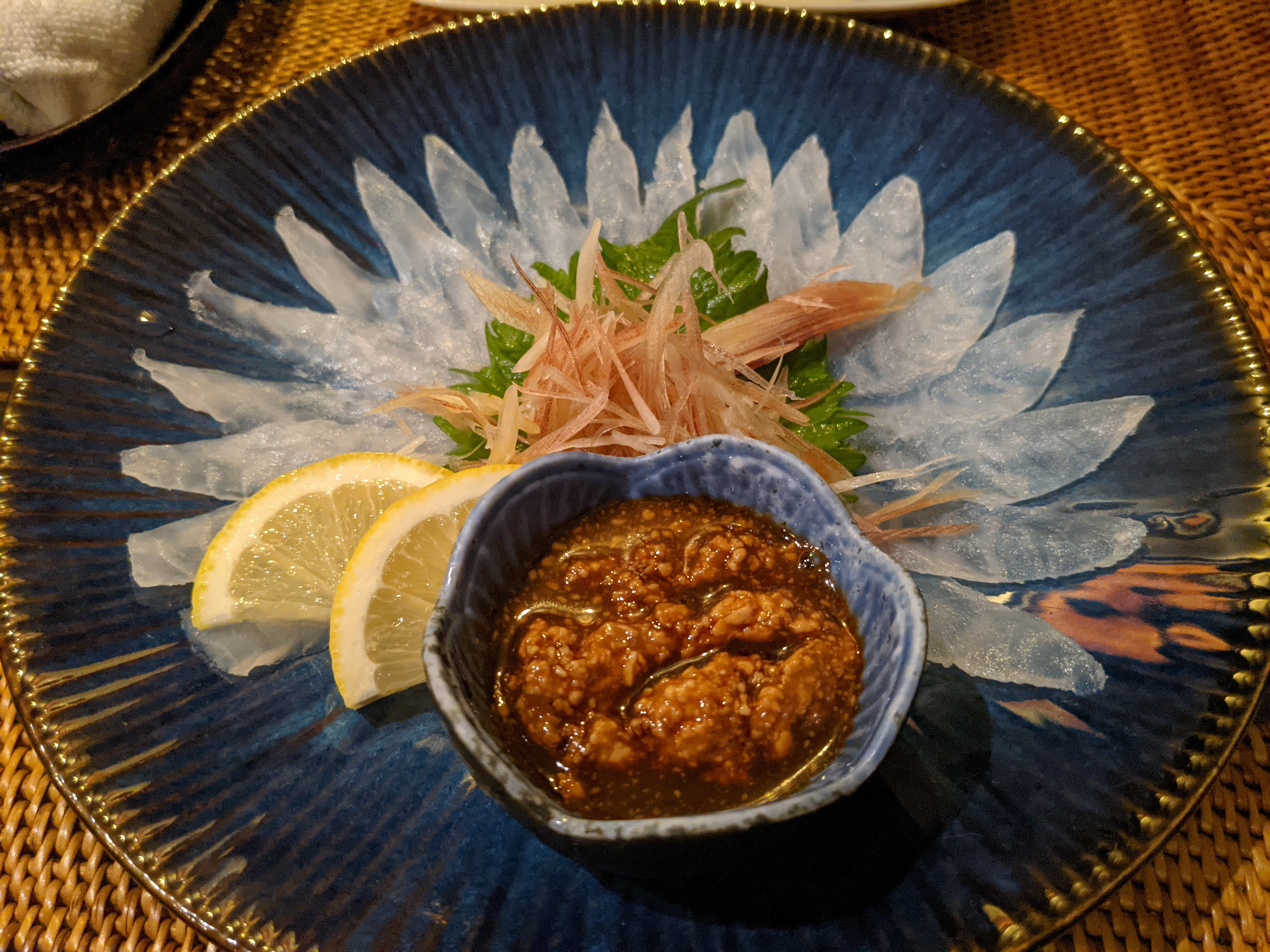
Kawahagi sashimi with liver sauce

Acreichthys tomentosus is often relied upon to control the aquarium pest Aiptasia, though they may be indiscriminate eaters and damage coral polyps.

== See also ==
- List of fish common names
- List of fish families
