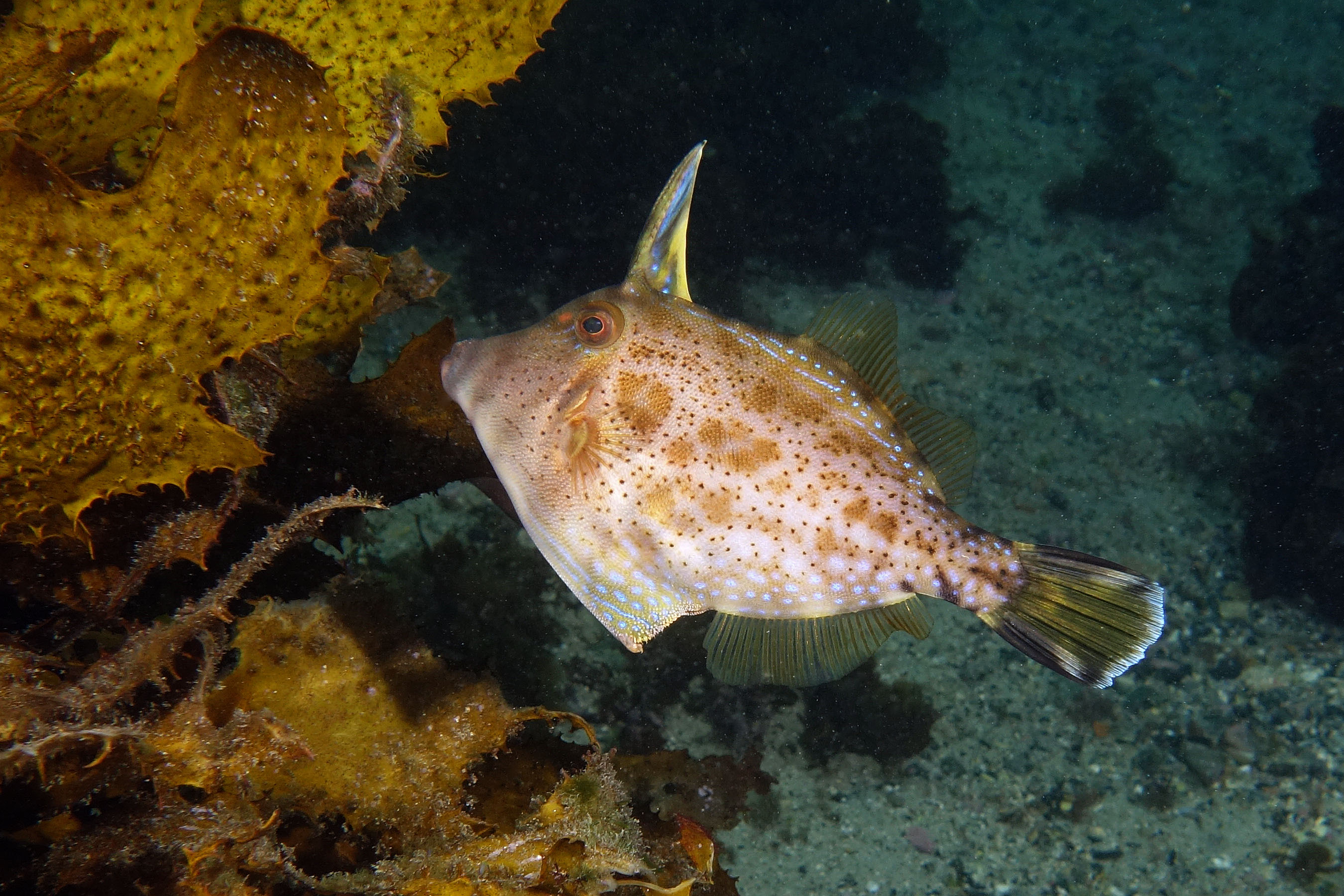

Scientific classification
- Kingdom: Animalia
- Phylum: Chordata
- Class: Actinopterygii
- Division: Teleostei
- Order: Tetraodontiformes
- Family: Monacanthidae
- Genus: Scobinichthys; Whitley, 1931
- Species: S. granulatus

Binomial name
- Scobinichthys granulatus (J. White, 1790)

= Scobinichthys =

Species of fish

Scobinichthys granulatus also known as the rough leatherjacket is a species of filefish native to the coastal waters of southern Australia. It lives on rocky reefs and in beds of seagrass. This species grows to a length of 30 centimetres (12 in) TL. It is the only known member of the monotypic genus Scobinichthys.

== Gallery ==
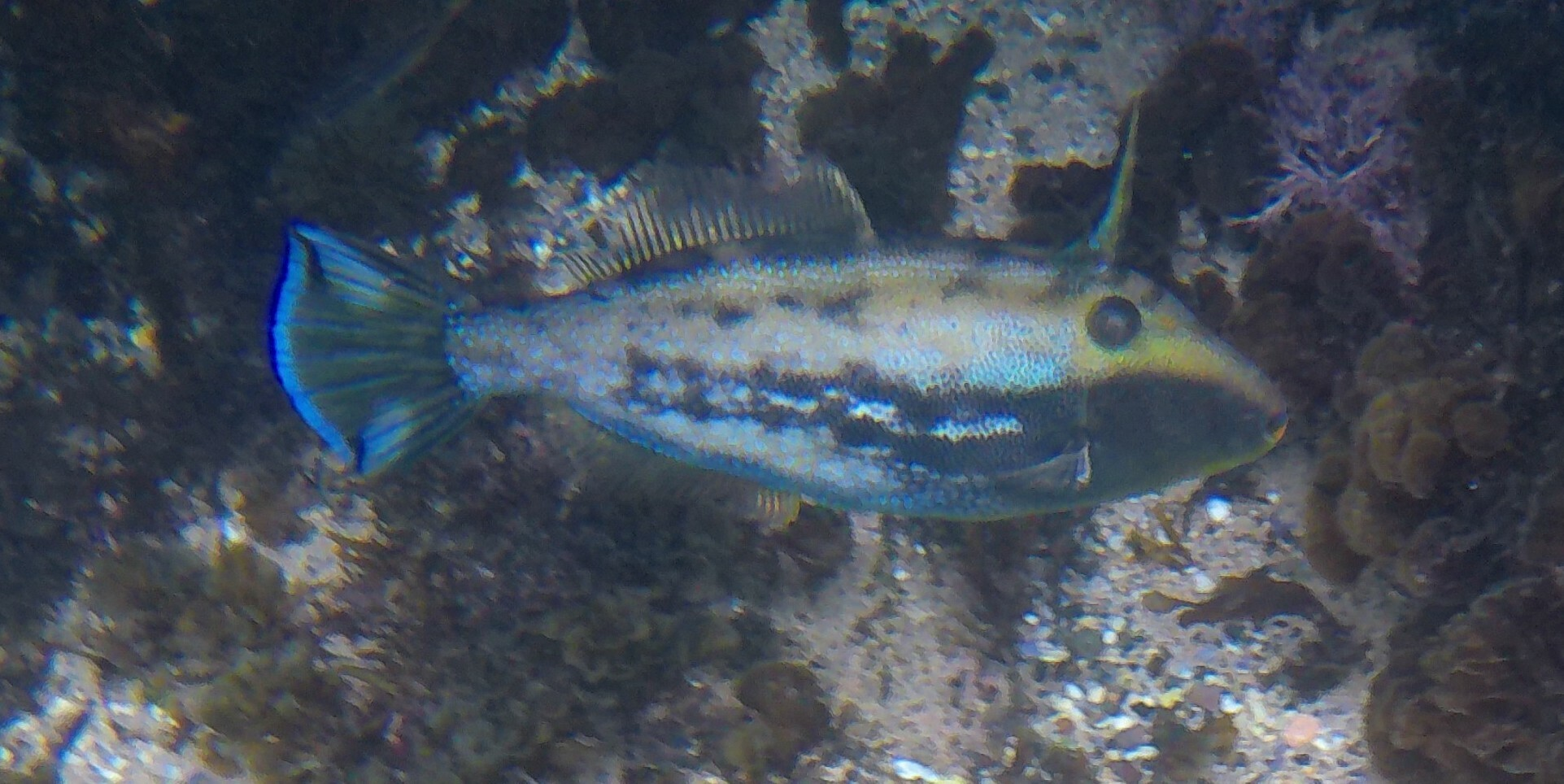

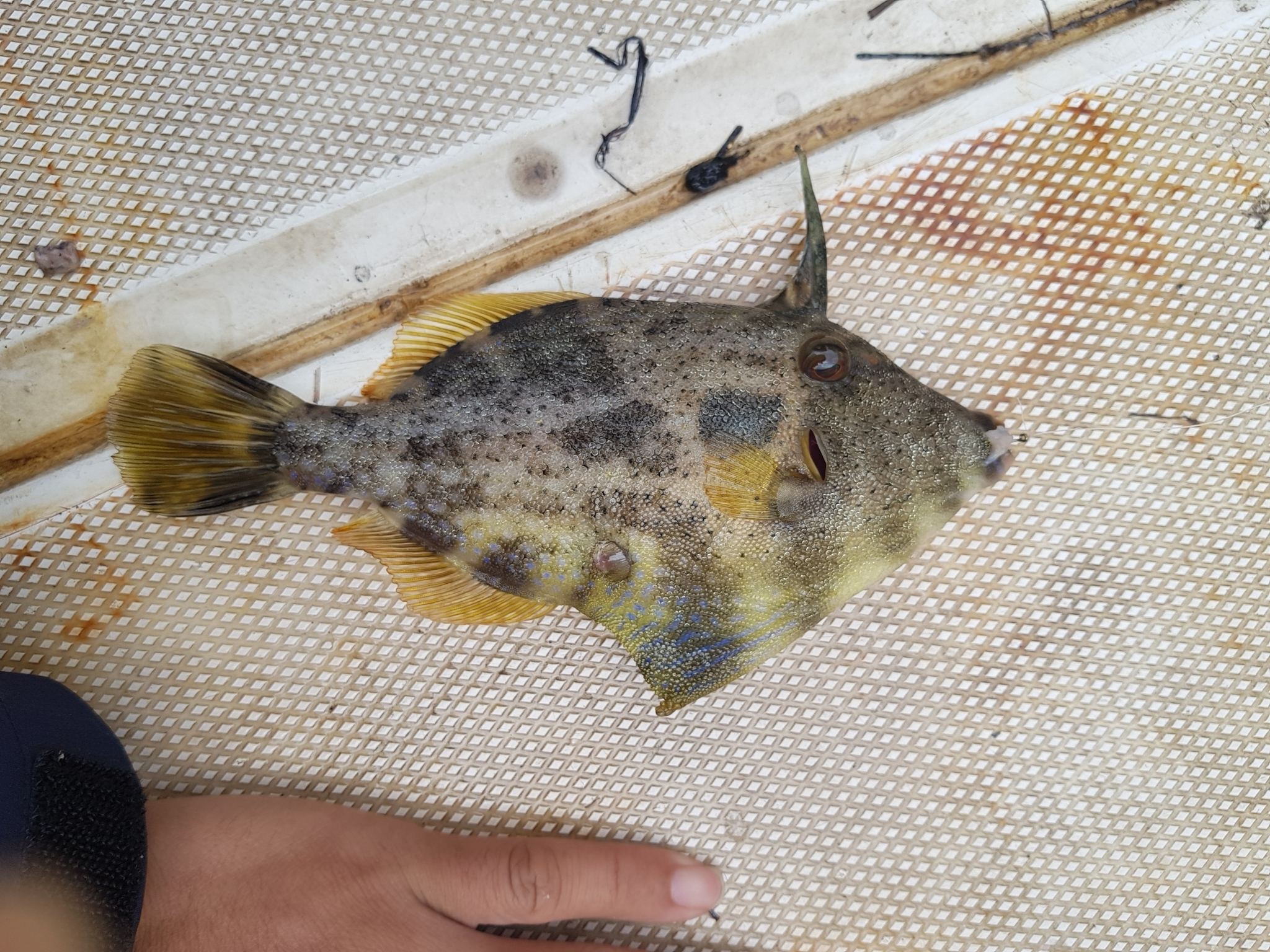

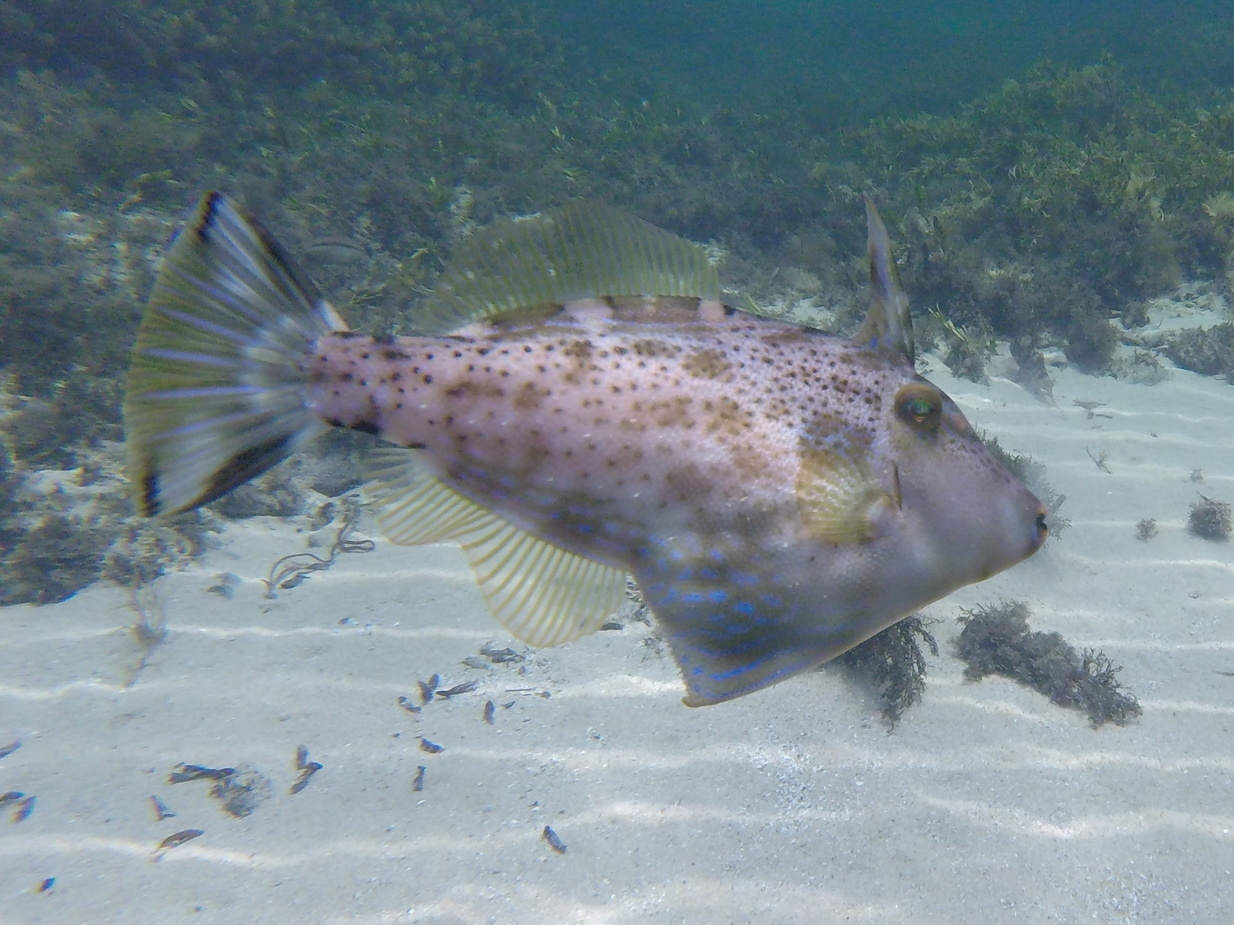

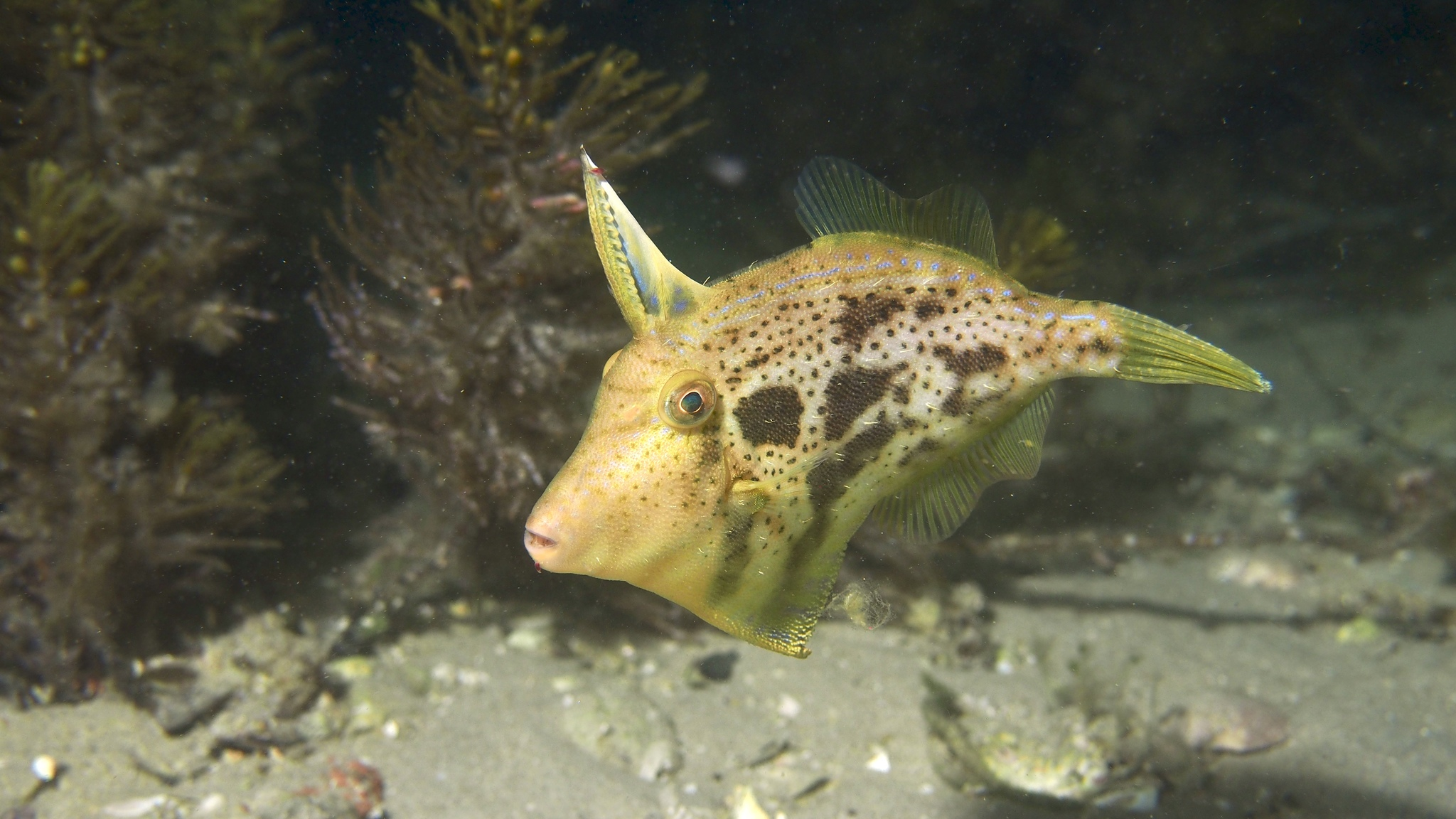
Off Victoria
