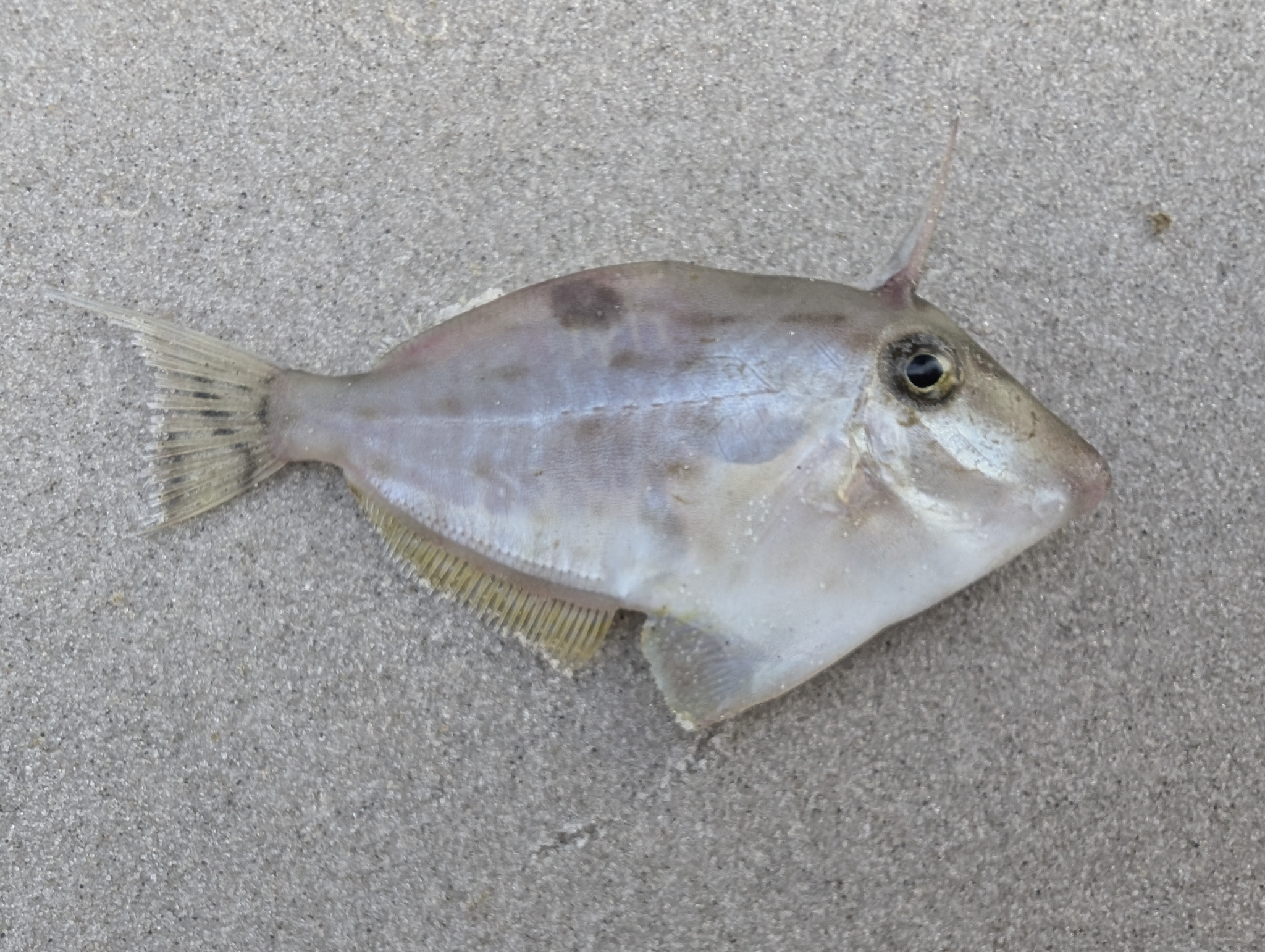

Scientific classification
- Kingdom: Animalia
- Phylum: Chordata
- Class: Actinopterygii
- Order: Tetraodontiformes
- Family: Monacanthidae
- Genus: Arotrolepis; Fraser-Brunner, 1941
- Species: A. filicauda

Binomial name
- Arotrolepis filicauda Günther, 1880

= Arotrolepis =

Genus of fishes

Arotrolepis filicauda is a filefish found in northern Western Australia, Northern Territory, Queensland, New South Wales, eastern Victoria, northern Tasmania, and southern Papua New Guinea, the sole member of the genus Arotrolepis.
