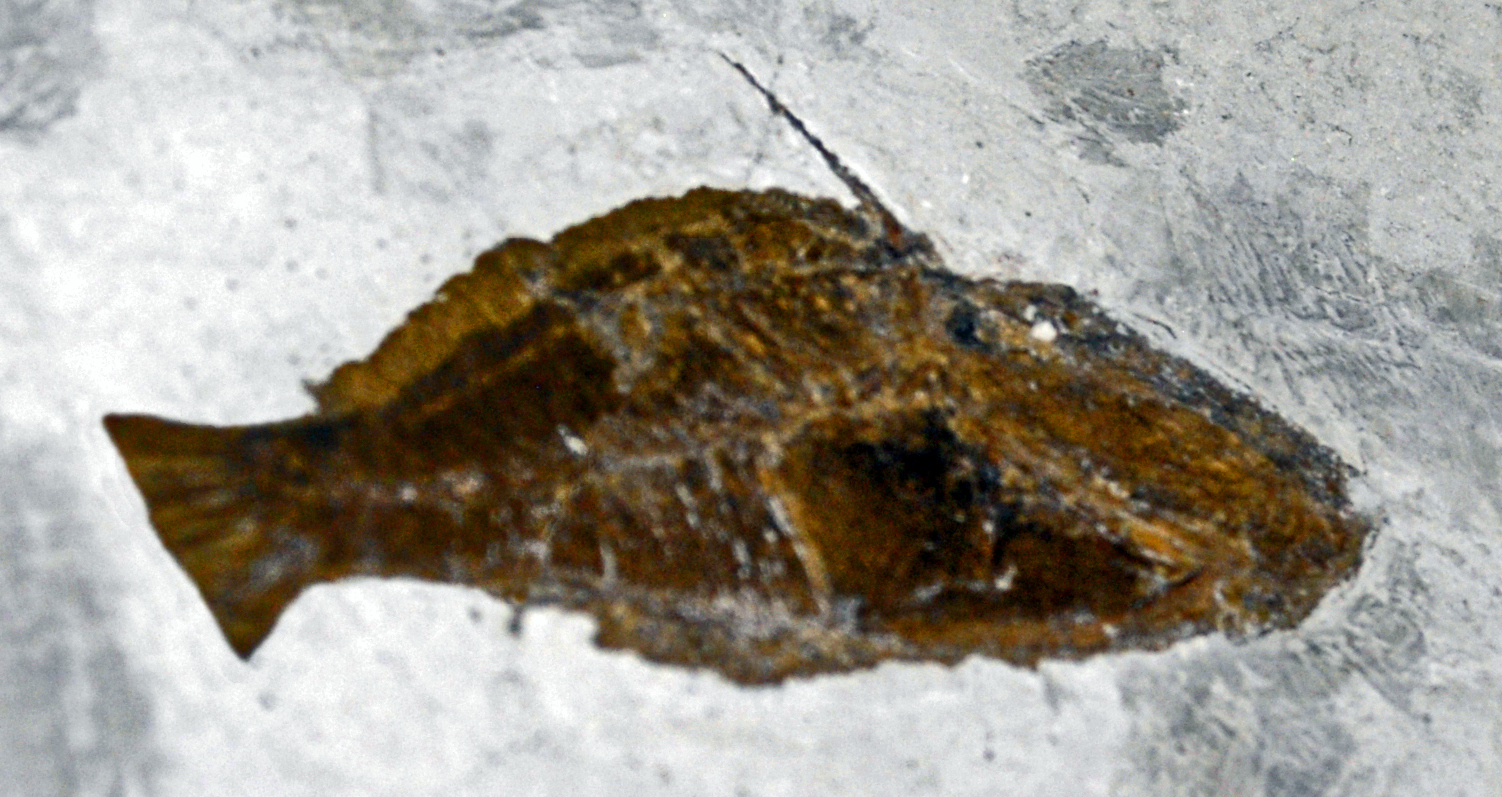
- Fossil of Frigocanthus margaritatus
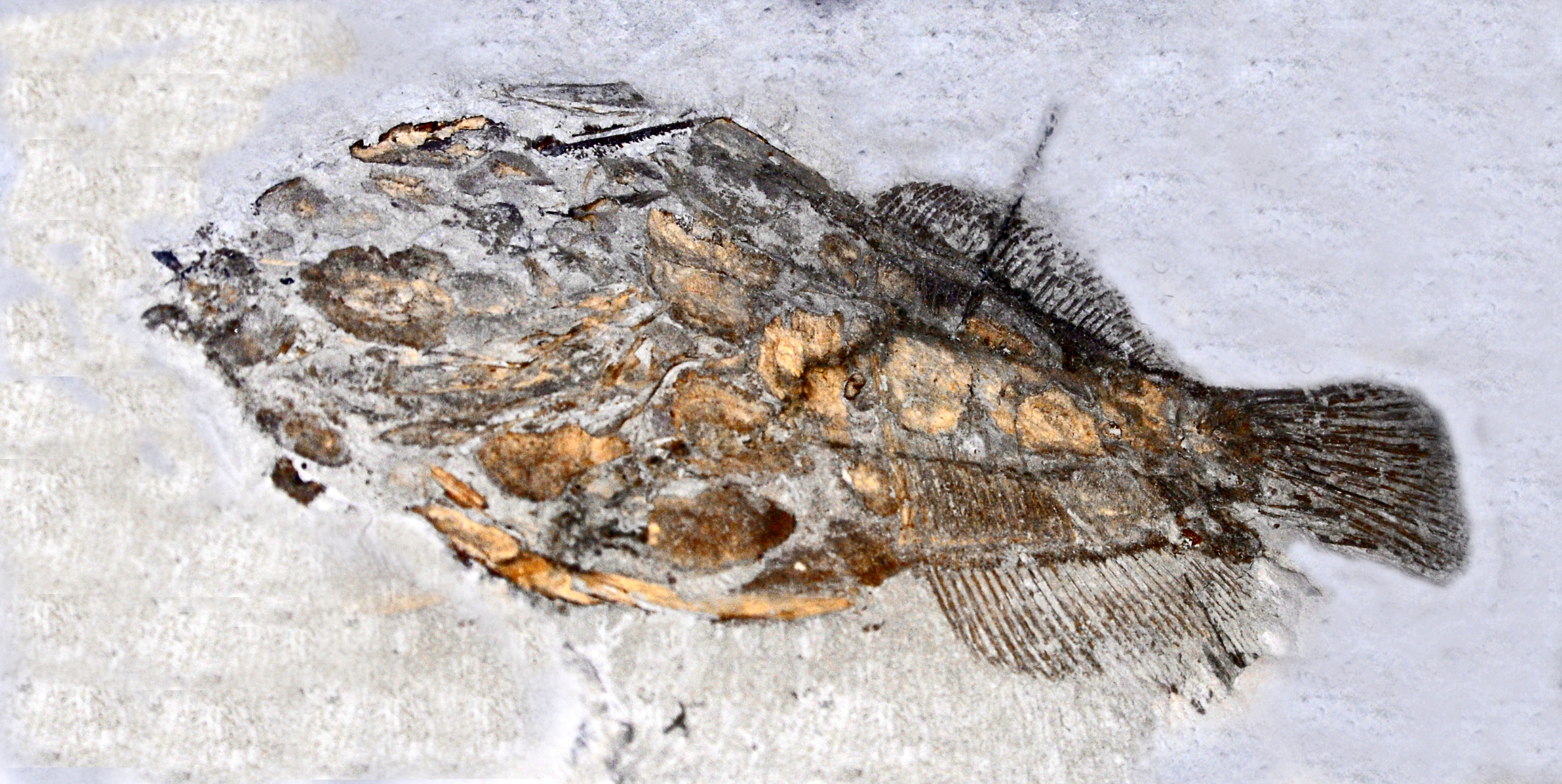
- Fossil of Frigocanthus stroppanobili

Scientific classification
- Kingdom: Animalia
- Phylum: Chordata
- Class: Actinopterygii
- Order: Tetraodontiformes
- Family: Monacanthidae
- Genus: †Frigocanthus; Sorbini & Tyler, 2004

= Frigocanthus =

Frigocanthus Temporal range: Pliocene–Pleistocene

Genus of fishes

Frigocanthus is a genus of extinct tetraodontiform marine fishes.

== Species ==
- Frigocanthus margaritatus
- Frigocanthus stroppanobili

== Fossil record ==
Fossils of Frigocanthus are found in the Pliocene and Pleistocene of Italy and in the Pliocene of Greece.

== Description ==
The filefishes of the genus Frigocanthus have 21 vertebrae and show a remarkable enlargement of scales. Furthermore, they have a strong first dorsal spine with large, prominent barbs. The species Frigocanthus margaritatus can reach a length of about 310 millimetres (12 in).

== Bibliography ==
- Sorbini, C. & Tyler, J.C. (2004) Review of the fossil file fishes of the family Monacanthidae (Tetraodontiformes), Pliocene and Pleistocene of Europe, with a new genus, Frigocanthus, and two new species related to the Recent Aluterus. Bollettino del Museo Civico di Storia Naturale di Verona, 28, 41–76. Geologia Paleontologia Preistoria
