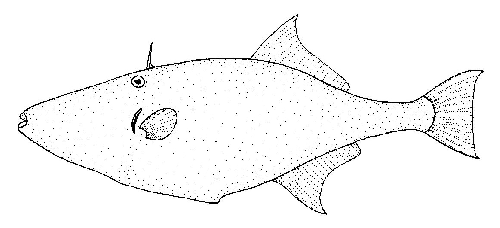

Conservation status
- Least Concern (IUCN 3.1)

Scientific classification
- Kingdom: Animalia
- Phylum: Chordata
- Class: Actinopterygii
- Division: Teleostei
- Order: Tetraodontiformes
- Family: Monacanthidae
- Genus: Nelusetta; Whitley, 1939
- Species: N. ayraud

Binomial name
- Nelusetta ayraud (Quoy & Gaimard, 1824)

Synonyms
- Balistes ayraud Quoy & Gaimard, 1824; Cantherhines ayraud (Quoy & Gaimard, 1824); Nelusetta ayraudi (Quoy & Gaimard, 1824); Aluterus velutinus Jenyns, 1842; Aleuteres velutinus Jenyns, 1842; Monacanthus vittatus Richardson, 1846; Monacanthus platifrons Hollard, 1854; Monocanthus platifrons Hollard, 1854; Monacanthus frauenfeldii Kner, 1867

= Nelusetta =

Species of fish

Nelusetta is a genus of fish comprising only a single species, Nelusetta ayraud. Commonly known as the chinaman-leatherjacket, yellow jacket, ocean leatherjacket, or ocean jacket, it is a species of filefish (Monacanthidae) inhabiting Southern Australia. It is fished commercially.

== Taxonomy ==
The generic name Nelusetta is a diminutive form of Nelus, a name already used for an insect by Navás 1929. The specific name ayraud honors Jean Jacques Victor Ayraud (1789–1821), a naval surgeon who had died of yellow fever in Fort-Royal, Martinique.

The common names allude to the tough, leathery skin of the fish, which lacks typical scales and can be removed intact, like a jacket, when being processed. Ocean jacket may be used to refer to other filefish in the region, though it is most commonly used for Nelusetta ayraud.

== Description ==
Ocean jackets vary in color, from whitish, pale yellowish brown, pale greyish brown, or reddish. Often, these fish have four, brown, longitudinal stripes on its side. They are highly compressed laterally. The fins are yellowish, though the membranes of the caudal fin are "dusky". As a filefish, the ocean jacket possesses two dorsal spines, with one of them notably enlarged. Behind it is the second dorsal fin which bears 30-36 soft rays. The anal fin has 30-34 soft rays. The pelvic fins are described as "rudimentary".

Adult female and juvenile ocean jackets are pale yellowish brown with orange-yellow fins. In contrast, males are greenish-grey to steel blue, with some having two, three, or more dark blotches on their sides, and have bright yellow fins. Juveniles have more distinct stripes than the adults.

The species commonly reaches 40 cm (16 in) and 0.8–1.5 kg (1.8–3.3 lb), though reaches 1 m (3.3 ft) and 3.5 kg (7.7 lb).

== Distribution ==
Nelusetta ayraud is native to the Eastern Indian Ocean, and sometimes considered endemic to Southern Australia, from New South Wales to Western Australia. One record is known from New Zealand.

== Biology ==
Nelusetta ayraud prefers barren regions, with either a sandy substrate or over rocky reefs, on the continental slope or shelf. They typically inhabit a depth range of 0 to 200 m (0 to 656 ft), though are recorded from 360 m (1,180 ft) down. Being recorded from both benthic and pelagic surveys, they may be very abundant in certain regions.

Ocean jackets are carnivorous; they are known to feed on salps, cephalopod and gastropod mollusks, crustaceans, and other fish. They are aggressive and may form small schools while feeding, and are known to attack larger fish, and divers.

Maturing around 37 cm (15 in) in length, or 2.5 years of age, spawning occurs in large aggregations (schools) at a depth of 85 to 200 m (280 to 655 ft). Depending on body size, females produce 0.7–2 million eggs each season, which lasts around 3 months across the whole range of the species. Unlike some other filefish, ocean jackets are broadcast spawners, releasing their eggs into the water column, and do not guard them.

Juveniles inhabit similar habitats to the adults, though are found inshore and may inhabit seagrass meadows and estuaries. As they grow, young N. ayraud move to progressively deeper waters. Ocean jackets are known to reach 9 years of age.

== Relation to humans ==
Ocean jackets are fished commercially, most being incidentally caught while bottom trawling or using Danish seines at a depth of 100 to 150 m (330 to 490 ft). Historical catches were defined by steep declines following large peaks.
