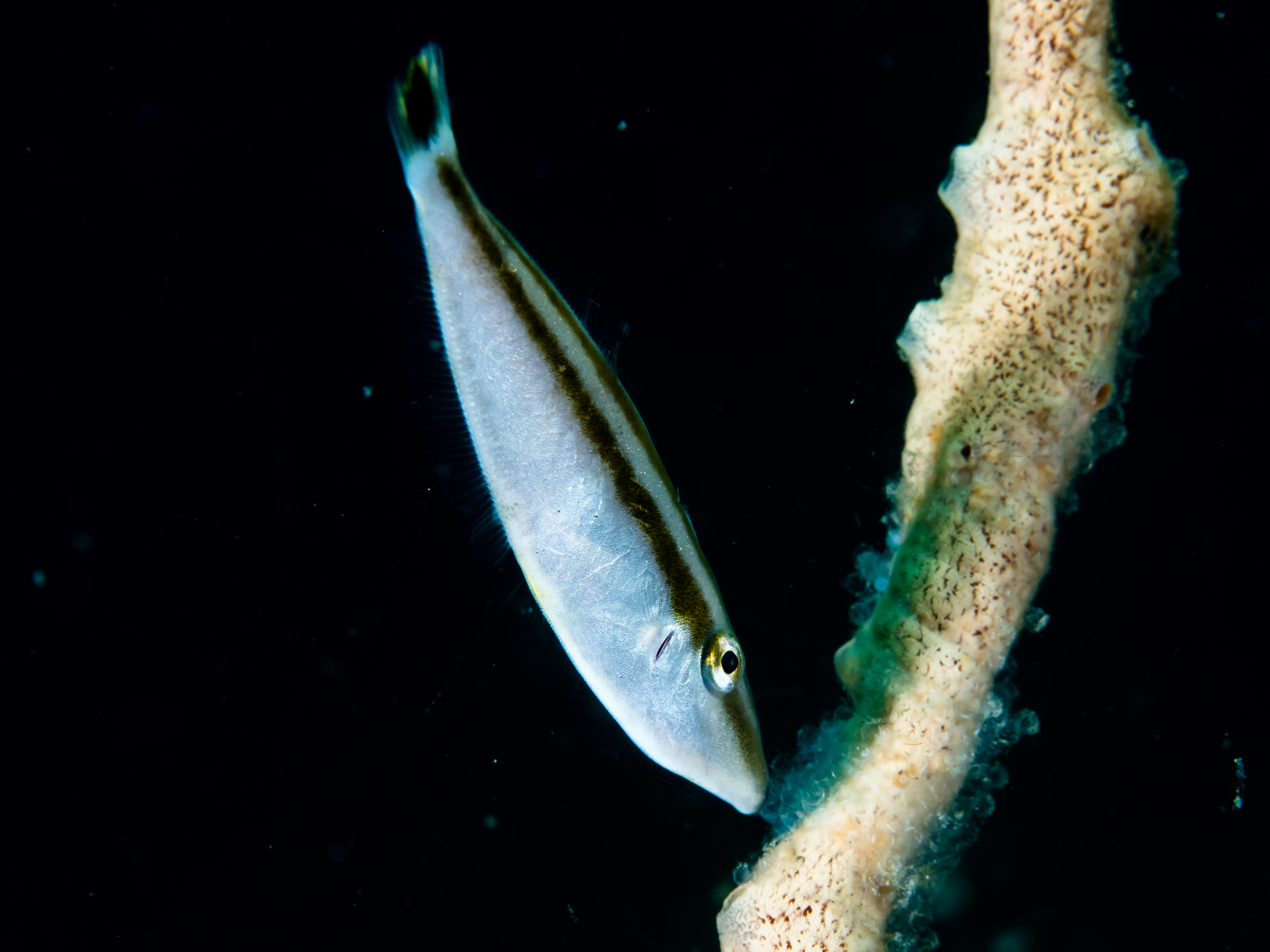

Scientific classification
- Kingdom: Animalia
- Phylum: Chordata
- Class: Actinopterygii
- Order: Tetraodontiformes
- Family: Monacanthidae
- Genus: Pseudalutarius; Bleeker, 1865
- Species: P. nasicornis

Binomial name
- Pseudalutarius nasicornis (Temminck & Schlegel, 1850)

= Pseudalutarius =

Genus of fishes

Pseudalutarius nasicornis also known as the rhinoceros leatherjacket is a species of filefish native to the Indian and western Pacific Oceans. It occurs on reefs at depths of from 1 to 55 metres (3.3 to 180.4 ft). This species grows to a length of 19 centimetres (7.5 in) TL. This species is the only known member of its genus.
