= Enigmacanthus =

Conservation status
- Data Deficient (IUCN 3.1)

Scientific classification
- Kingdom: Animalia
- Phylum: Chordata
- Class: Actinopterygii
- Order: Tetraodontiformes
- Family: Monacanthidae
- Genus: Enigmacanthus; Hutchins, 2002
- Species: E. filamentosus

Binomial name
- Enigmacanthus filamentosus Hutchins, 2002

Species of fish

Enigmacanthus filamentosus is a species of filefish native to the Marshall Islands and the Seychelles. This species grows to a length of 3.6 centimetres (1.4 in) SL. This species is the only known member of the genus Enigmacanthus.
