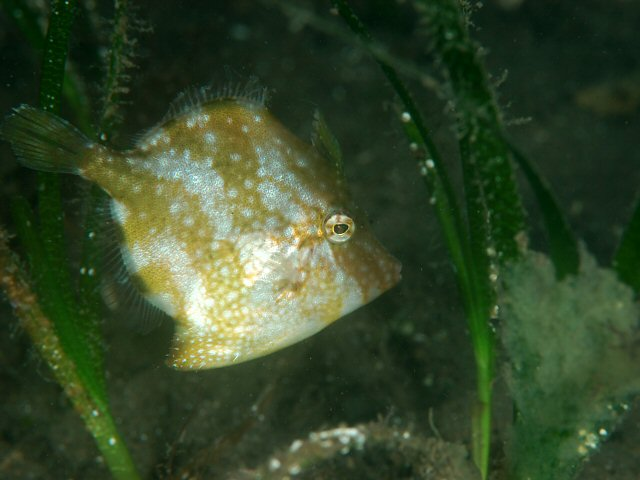

Scientific classification
- Kingdom: Animalia
- Phylum: Chordata
- Class: Actinopterygii
- Order: Tetraodontiformes
- Family: Monacanthidae
- Genus: Rudarius
- Species: R. ercodes

Binomial name
- Rudarius ercodes D. S. Jordan & Fowler, 1902

= Rudarius ercodes =

Species of fish

Rudarius ercodes, the whitespotted pygmy filefish, is a species of reef filefish in the family Monacanthidae. It is a small fish, growing to only 5 cm (2 in), and is found in the temperate waters of Japan. It is kept in captivity and has been successfully captive bred.
