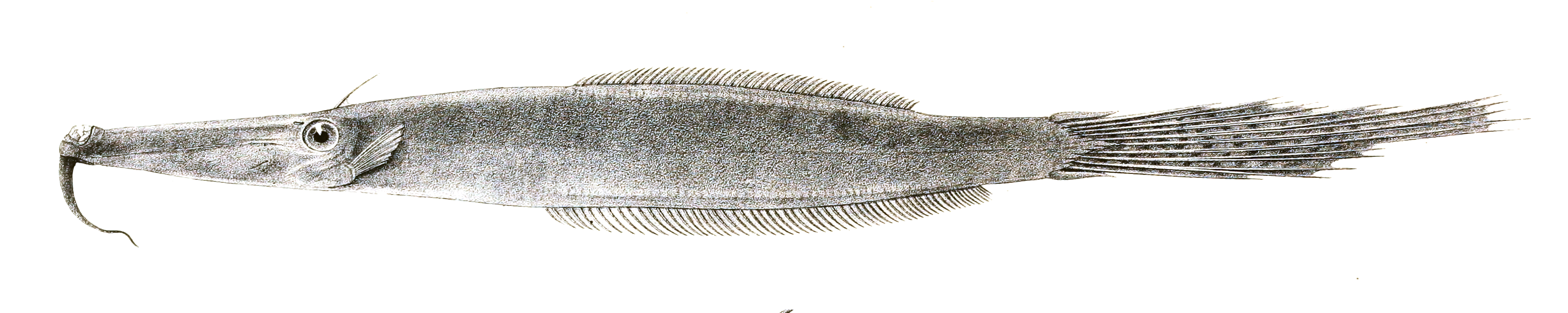

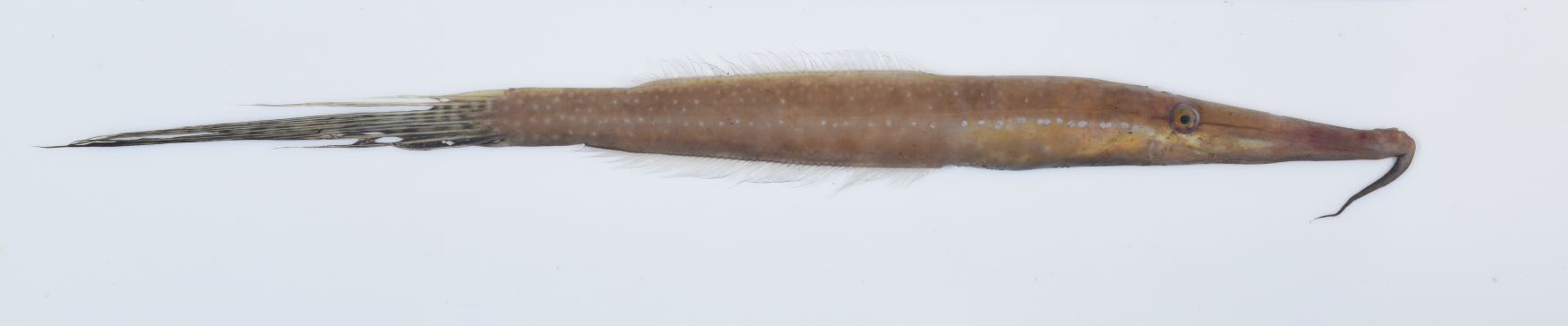

Conservation status
- Least Concern (IUCN 3.1)

Scientific classification
- Kingdom: Animalia
- Phylum: Chordata
- Class: Actinopterygii
- Order: Tetraodontiformes
- Family: Monacanthidae
- Genus: Anacanthus; J. E. Gray, 1830
- Species: A. barbatus

Binomial name
- Anacanthus barbatus J. E. Gray, 1830

= Anacanthus =

Bearded leatherjacket

Genus of fishes

Anacanthus barbatus, also known as the bearded leatherjacket, is a species of filefish found in the Indo-Pacific. It is found on reefs at depths of from 3 to 8 metres (9.8 to 26.2 ft). This species grows to a length of 35 centimetres (14 in) TL. This species is the only known member of its genus. This species is of minor importance to local commercial fisheries.
