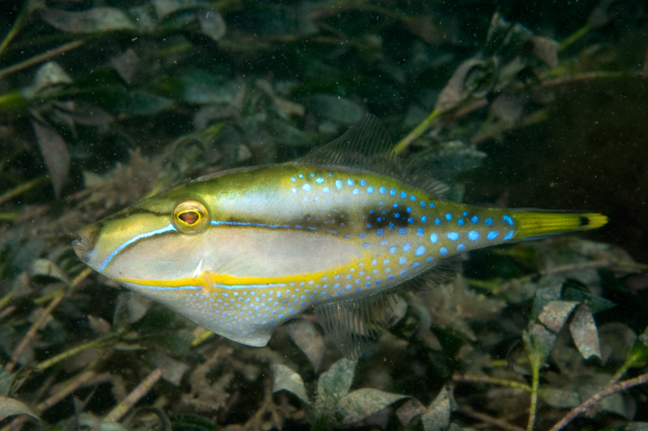

Scientific classification
- Kingdom: Animalia
- Phylum: Chordata
- Class: Actinopterygii
- Order: Tetraodontiformes
- Family: Monacanthidae
- Genus: Acanthaluteres
- Species: A. spilomelanurus

Binomial name
- Acanthaluteres spilomelanurus Quoy & Gaimard, 1824

= Acanthaluteres spilomelanurus =

Species of fish

Acanthaluteres spilomelanurus, the bridled leatherjacket, is a species of fish of the family Monacanthidae in the order of Tetraodontiformes. It can reach 14 cm in total length.

== Habitat ==
It is a fish of subtropical climate and demersal.

== Geographical distribution ==
It is found in Australia, from Perth to Sydney.

== Comments ==
It is harmless to humans.

== Gallery ==
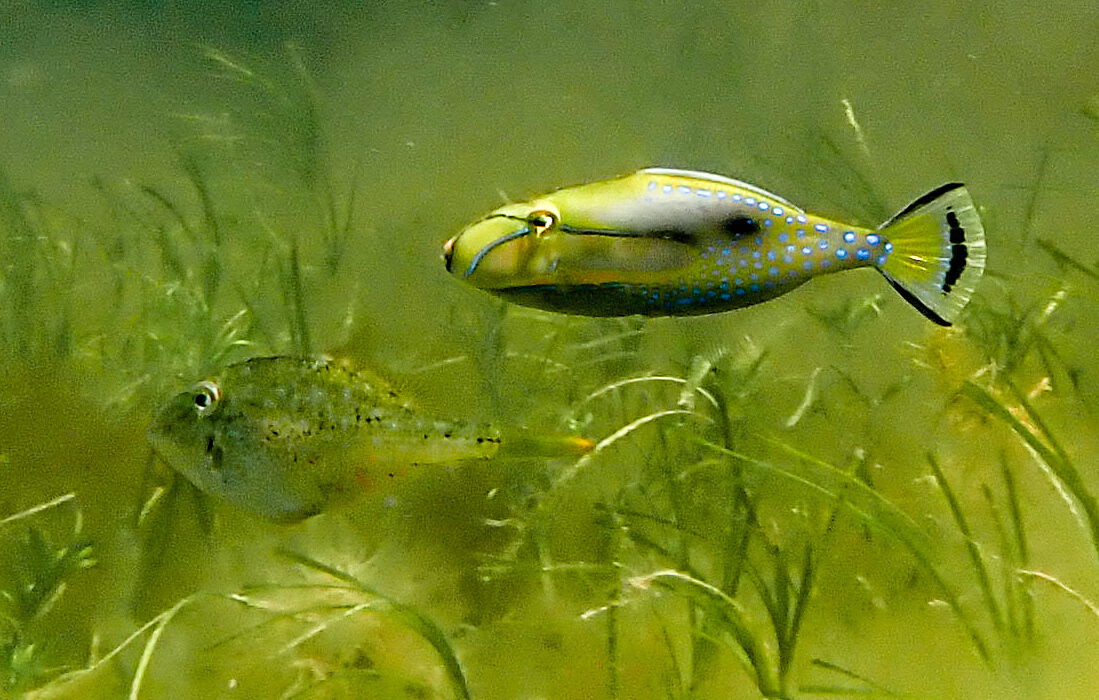
Female (left), male (right)

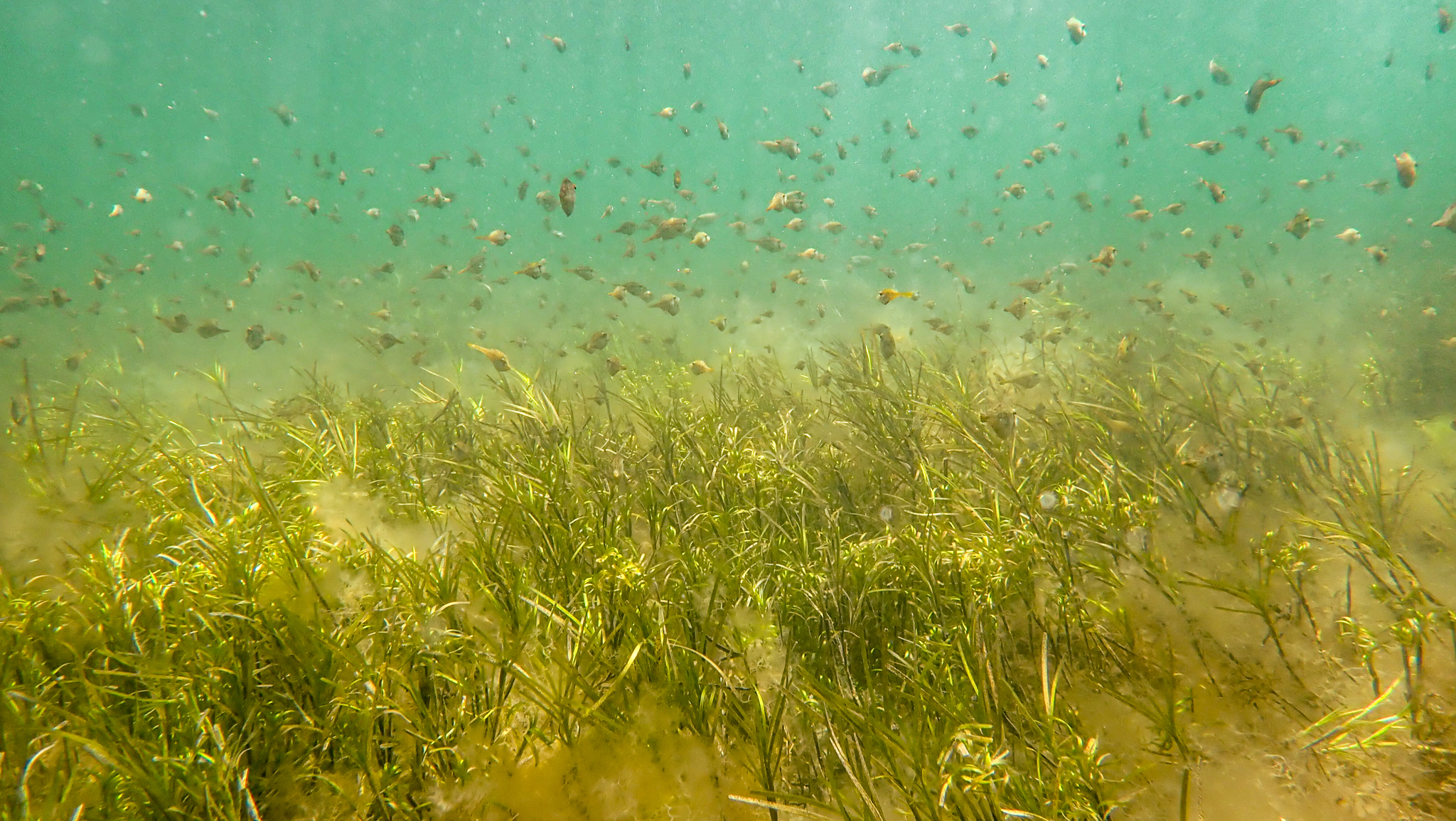
Congregation in Tasmania

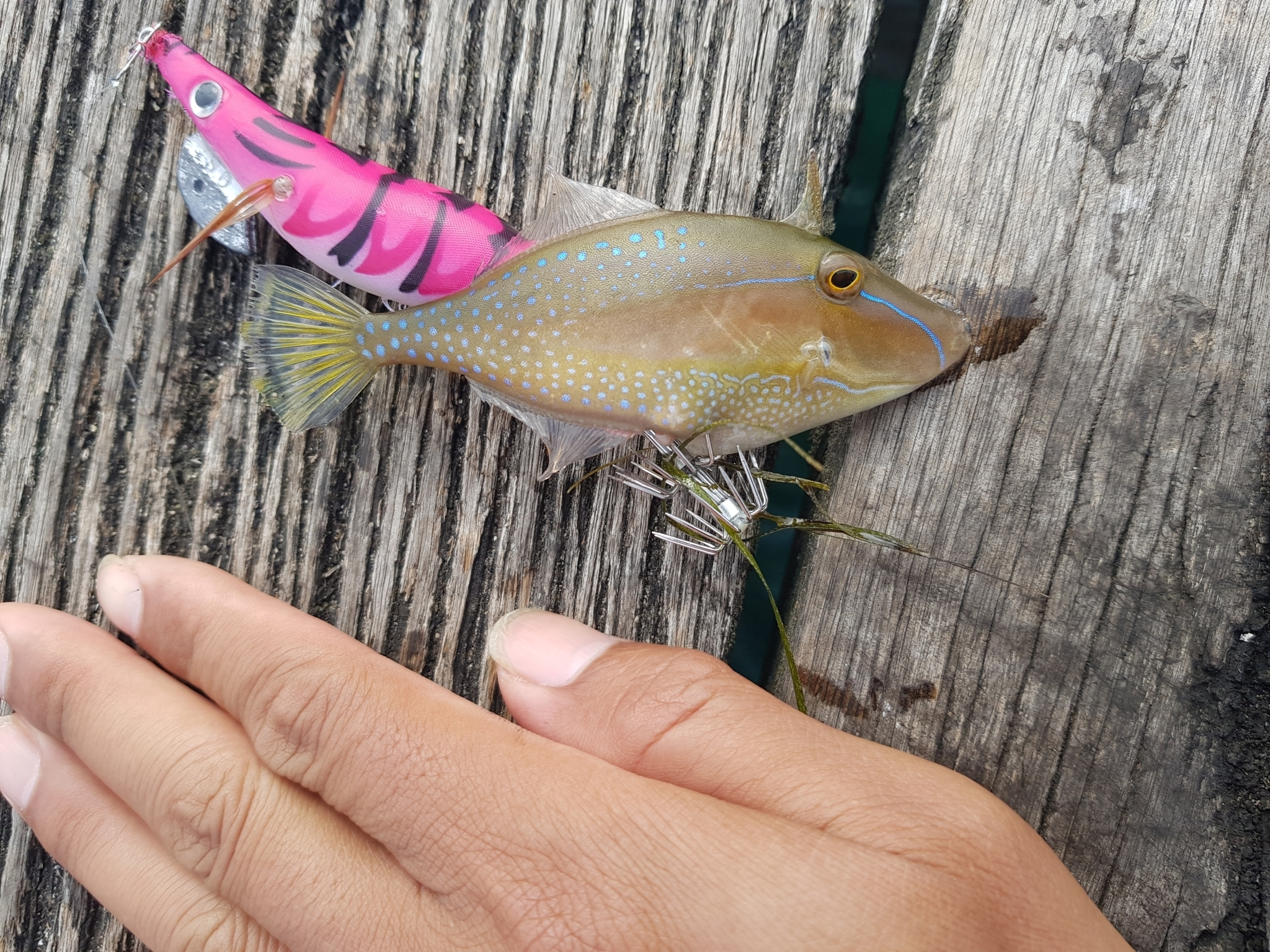
Showing size

== See also ==
- Acanthaluteres brownii
- Acanthaluteres vittiger
