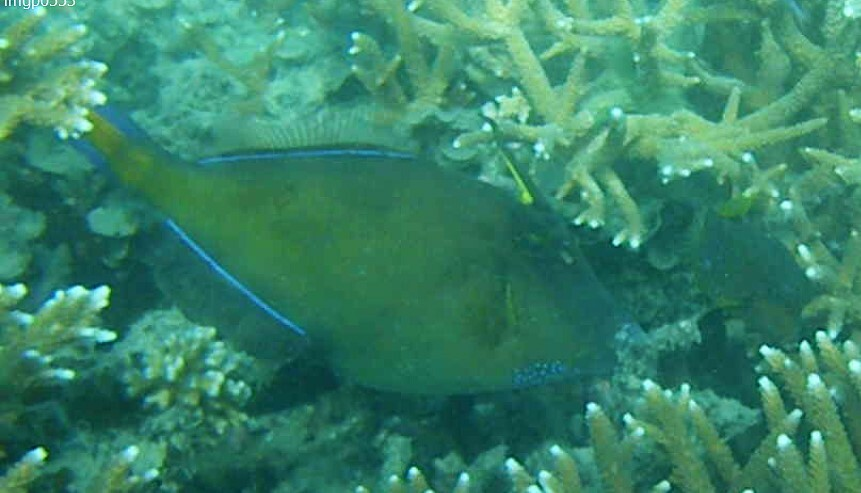
- Cantheschenia grandisquamis

Scientific classification
- Kingdom: Animalia
- Phylum: Chordata
- Class: Actinopterygii
- Order: Tetraodontiformes
- Family: Monacanthidae
- Genus: Cantheschenia; Hutchins, 1977

= Cantheschenia =

Genus of fishes

Cantheschenia is a genus of filefishes native to the western Pacific Ocean.

== Species ==
There are currently 2 recognized species in this genus:

- Cantheschenia grandisquamis Hutchins, 1977 (Large-scaled leatherjacket)
- Cantheschenia longipinnis Fraser-Brunner, 1941
