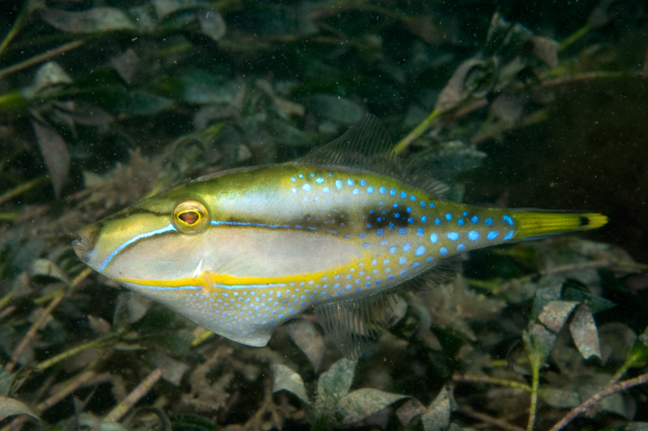
- Acanthaluteres spilomelanurus

Scientific classification
- Kingdom: Animalia
- Phylum: Chordata
- Class: Actinopterygii
- Order: Tetraodontiformes
- Family: Monacanthidae
- Genus: Acanthaluteres; Bleeker, 1865

= Acanthaluteres =

Genus of fishes

Acanthaluteres is a genus of filefishes native to the Indian and Pacific Oceans.

== Species ==
There are currently 3 recognized species in this genus:

Species	Common name	Image
Acanthaluteres brownii J. Richardson, 1846	Spiny-tailed leatherjacket	
Acanthaluteres spilomelanurus Quoy & Gaimard, 1824	Bridled leatherjacket	
Acanthaluteres vittiger Castelnau, 1873	Toothbrush leatherjacket	
