= Lalmohania =

Scientific classification
- Kingdom: Animalia
- Phylum: Chordata
- Class: Actinopterygii
- Order: Tetraodontiformes
- Family: Monacanthidae
- Genus: Lalmohania; Hutchins, 1994
- Species: L. velutina

Binomial name
- Lalmohania velutina Hutchins, 1994

Species of fish

Lalmohania velutina is a species of filefish known only from the Gulf of Mannar in India. This species grows to a length of 7.2 centimetres (2.8 in) SL. This species is the only known member of the genus Lalmohania.
