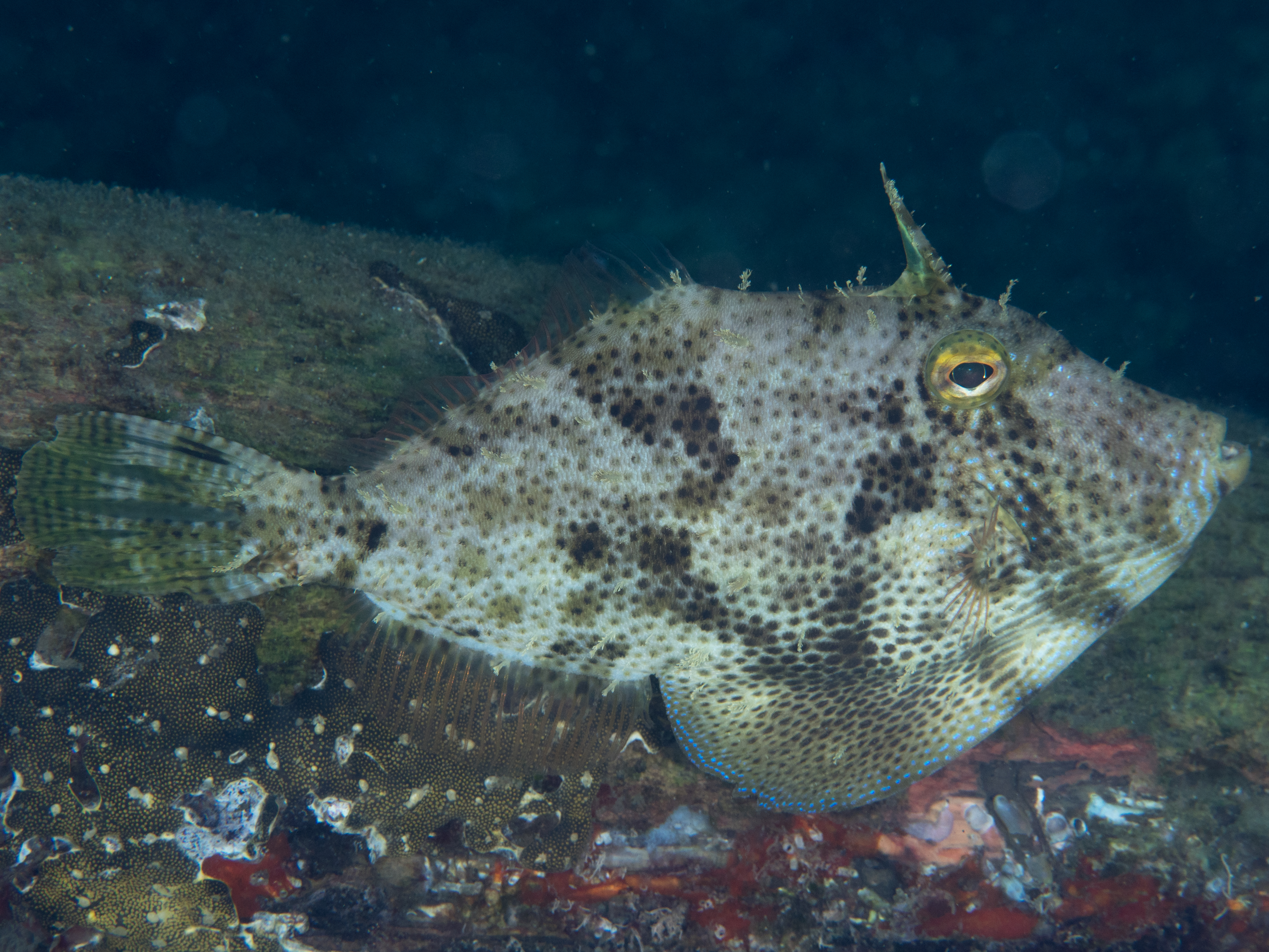
- Pseudomonacanthus macrurus

Scientific classification
- Kingdom: Animalia
- Phylum: Chordata
- Class: Actinopterygii
- Order: Tetraodontiformes
- Family: Monacanthidae
- Genus: Pseudomonacanthus; Bleeker, 1865

= Pseudomonacanthus =

Genus of fishes

Pseudomonacanthus is a genus in the filefishes native to the Indian and western Pacific oceans.

== Species ==
There are currently four recognized species in this genus:

- Pseudomonacanthus elongatus Fraser-Brunner, 1940 (Fourband leatherjacket)
- Pseudomonacanthus macrurus (Bleeker, 1857) (Strap-weed filefish)
- Pseudomonacanthus peroni (Hollard, 1854) (Pot-bellied leatherjacket)
- Pseudomonacanthus tweediei Fraser-Brunner, 1940
