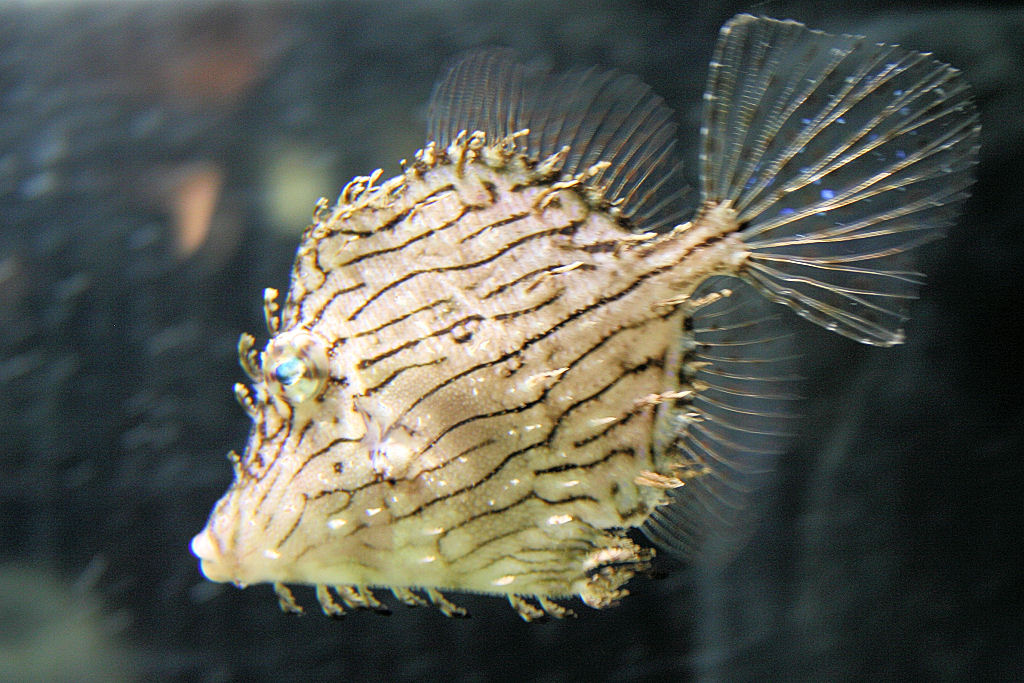

Conservation status
- Least Concern (IUCN 3.1)

Scientific classification
- Kingdom: Animalia
- Phylum: Chordata
- Class: Actinopterygii
- Order: Tetraodontiformes
- Family: Monacanthidae
- Genus: Chaetodermis; Swainson, 1839
- Species: C. penicilligerus

Binomial name
- Chaetodermis penicilligerus G. Cuvier, 1816

Synonyms
- Balistes penicilligerus Cuvier, 1816; Chaetoderma penicilligera Cuvier, 1816; Chaetodermis maccullochi Waite, 1905; Chaetodermis penicilligera Cuvier, 1816

= Chaetodermis =

Species of fish

Chaetodermis penicilligerus, also known as the prickly leather-jacket, tasselled leather-jacket or leafy filefish, is a demersal marine fish belonging to the family Monacanthidae. This fish is in the monotypic genus Chaetodermis. It occasionally makes its way into the marine aquarium fish trade.

== Description ==
The prickly leather-jacket is a medium-sized fish which grows up to 31 cm (12 in). The body is highly compressed laterally, stocky, the mouth is terminal; the head size is big proportionally to the body.

Dermal appendages are visible mainly on the body's margin and also on the sides. They are part of the fish's camouflage system.

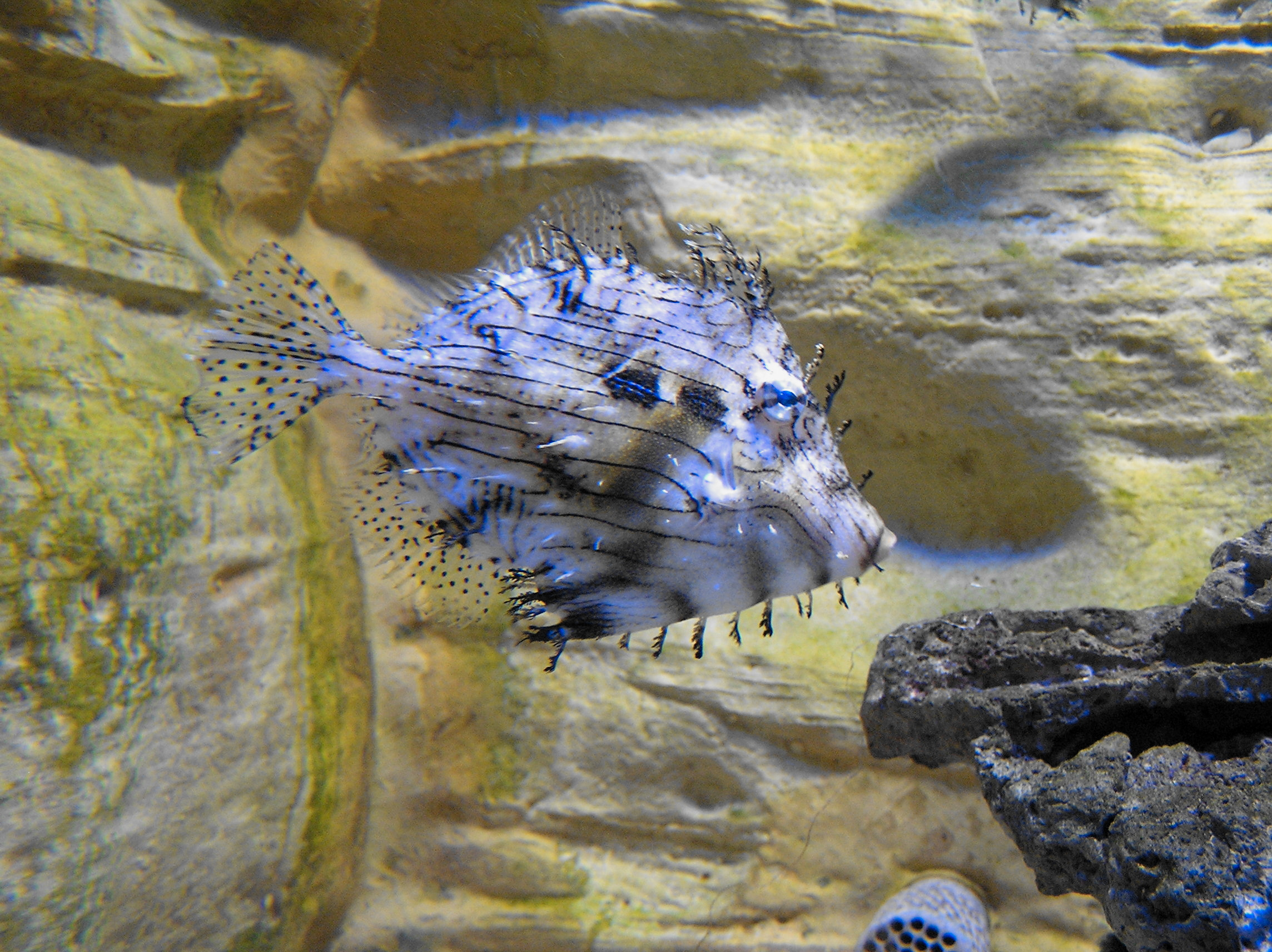

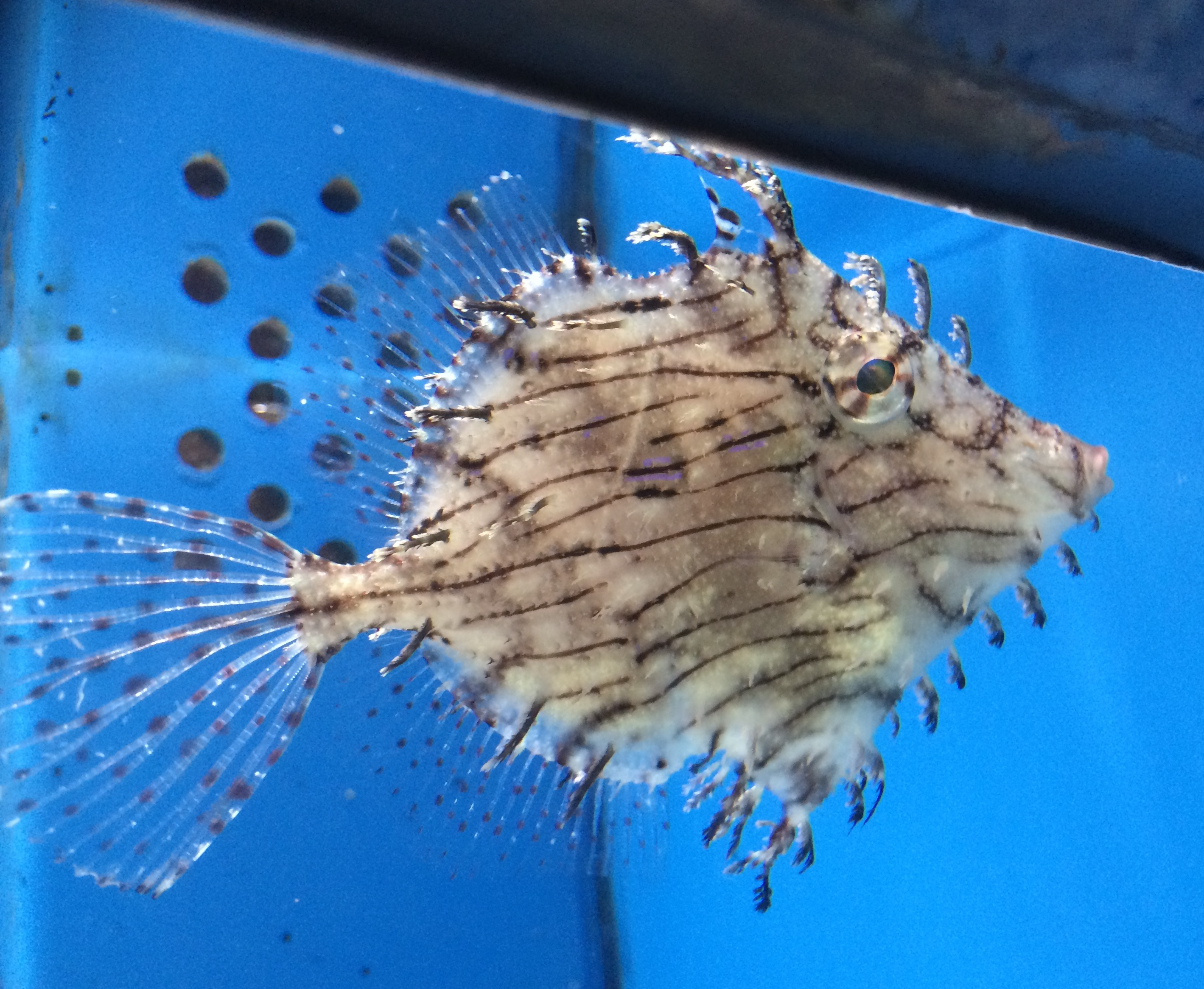

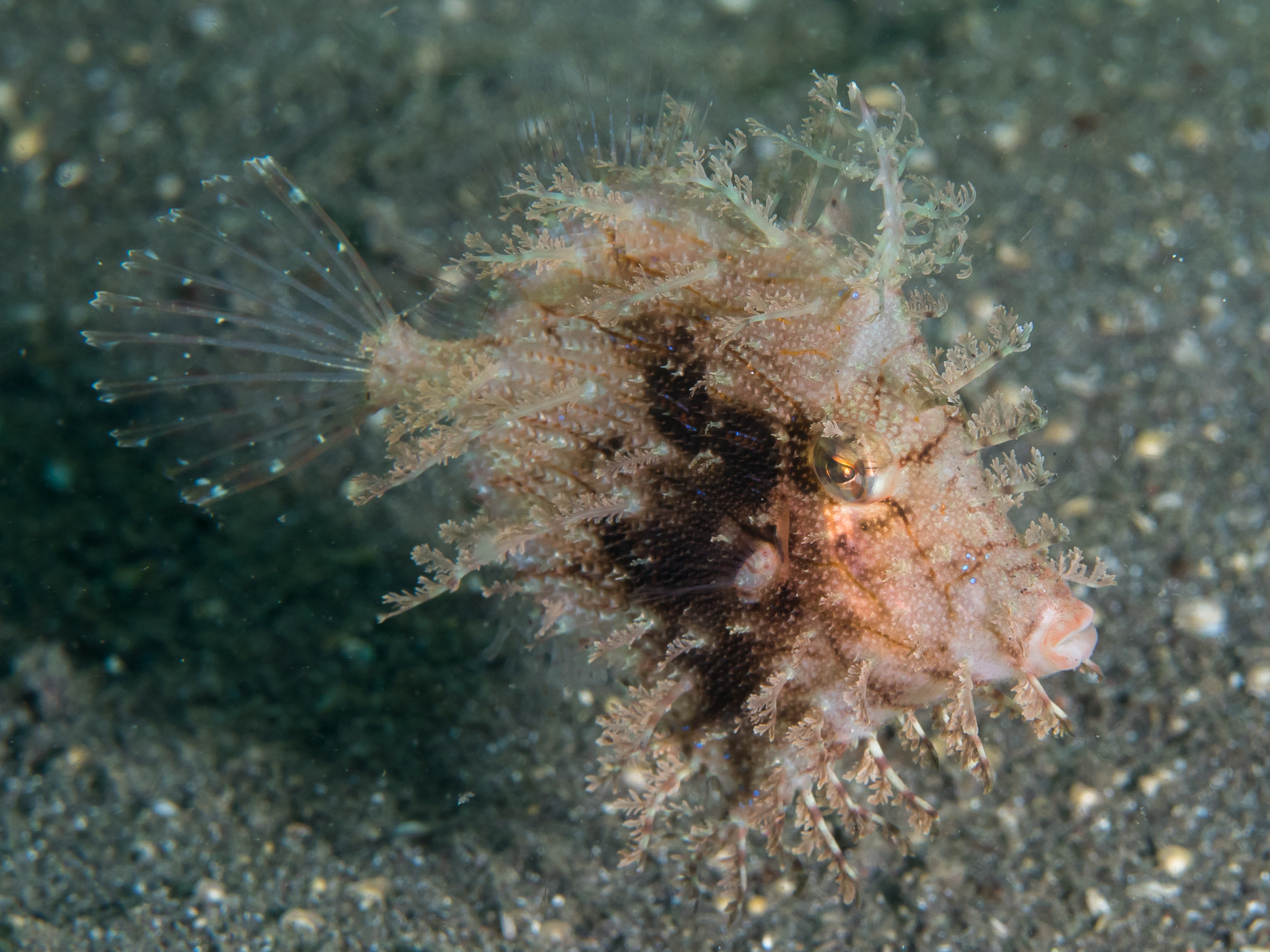

== Distribution and habitat ==
It is widely distributed throughout the tropical waters of the Indian Ocean, Red Sea, Persian Gulf and South Africa excluded, to the central islands of the Pacific Ocean.

The background coloration of the body is light brown or sand-colored with dark longitudinal lines and blotches outlined with blue. The prickly leather-jacket has two erectile dorsal spines. Its dorsal, anal and caudal fin are translucent but only the rays are a bit darker and visible.

== Feeding ==
The prickly leather-jacket mainly feeds on algae and small marine invertebrates.

== Behavior ==
The prickly leather-jacket is solitary and has a diurnal activity.
