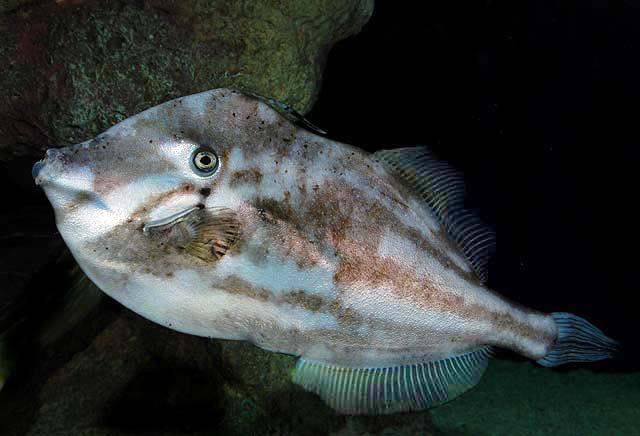

Conservation status
- Least Concern (IUCN 3.1)

Scientific classification
- Kingdom: Animalia
- Phylum: Chordata
- Class: Actinopterygii
- Order: Tetraodontiformes
- Family: Monacanthidae
- Genus: Aluterus
- Species: A. schoepfii

Binomial name
- Aluterus schoepfii (Walbaum, 1792)
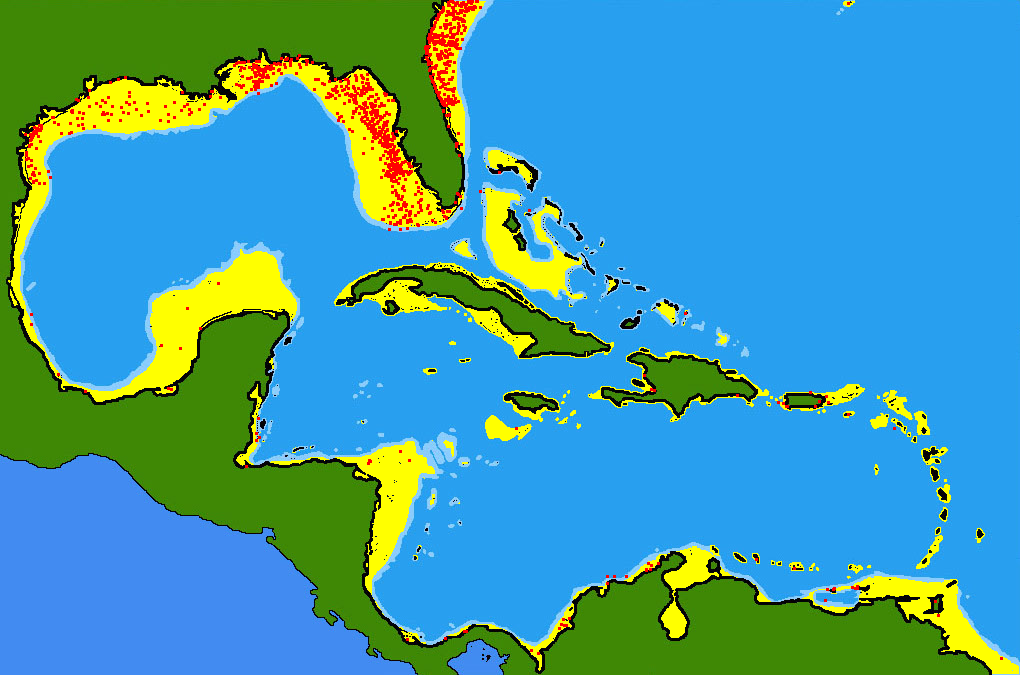

= Aluterus schoepfii =

Orange filefish

Species of fish

Aluterus schoepfii, the orange filefish, is a species of fish in the family Monacanthidae.

== Characteristics ==
Orange filefish can be distinguished by the presence of 2 dorsal spines and 32–29 dorsal soft rays. They do not have anal spines but have 35–41 anal soft rays. The pelvic terminus is absent, the body has numerous small round orange or orange-yellow spots, and the lips are often blackish. They can reach a maximum size of about 61–62 centimetres (24–24 in) although they are common to 40 centimetres (16 in).

== Distribution ==
Orange filefish are distributed along the Western Atlantic from Nova Scotia through Bermuda and the northern Gulf of Mexico to Brazil. Distribution along the Eastern Atlantic ranges from Cape Blanc (Mauritania) to Angola.

== Habitat ==
Orange filefish are benthic fish distributed in a depth range of 3 to 900 metres (10 to 2,953 ft), but usually in shallow waters. These fish are usually found solitary or in pairs over sea bottoms with sea grass, sand, or mud. Juveniles can be found associated with floating Sargassum.

== Feeding ==
Orange filefish feed on a variety of aquatic vegetation, including sea grasses and algae, as well as a variety of marine invertebrates, such as crustaceans, tunicates, sponges, jellies, sea anemones.

== Importance to humans ==
Orange filefish are considered trash fish and rarely consumed by humans. In Brazil these fish are traded as aquarium fish. These fish contain a poison (ciguatoxin) in their flesh, which may cause ciguatera poisoning if eaten.

== Similar species ==
The dotterel filefish is similar to the orange filefish, although the dotterel filefish has a longer tail fin and no orange spots along the body. The orange filefish differs from other filefishes by having only 2 dorsal spines.
