= Davidia =

Davidia is the scientific name of two genera of organisms and may refer to:

- Davidia (mollusk), a genus of fossil mollusks
- Davidia (plant), a genus of flowering trees with a single species, Davidia involucrata
- Aluterus, the valid name of the junior synonym Davidia Miranda Ribeiro, 1915
- Davidia (fungi), a genus of fungi
