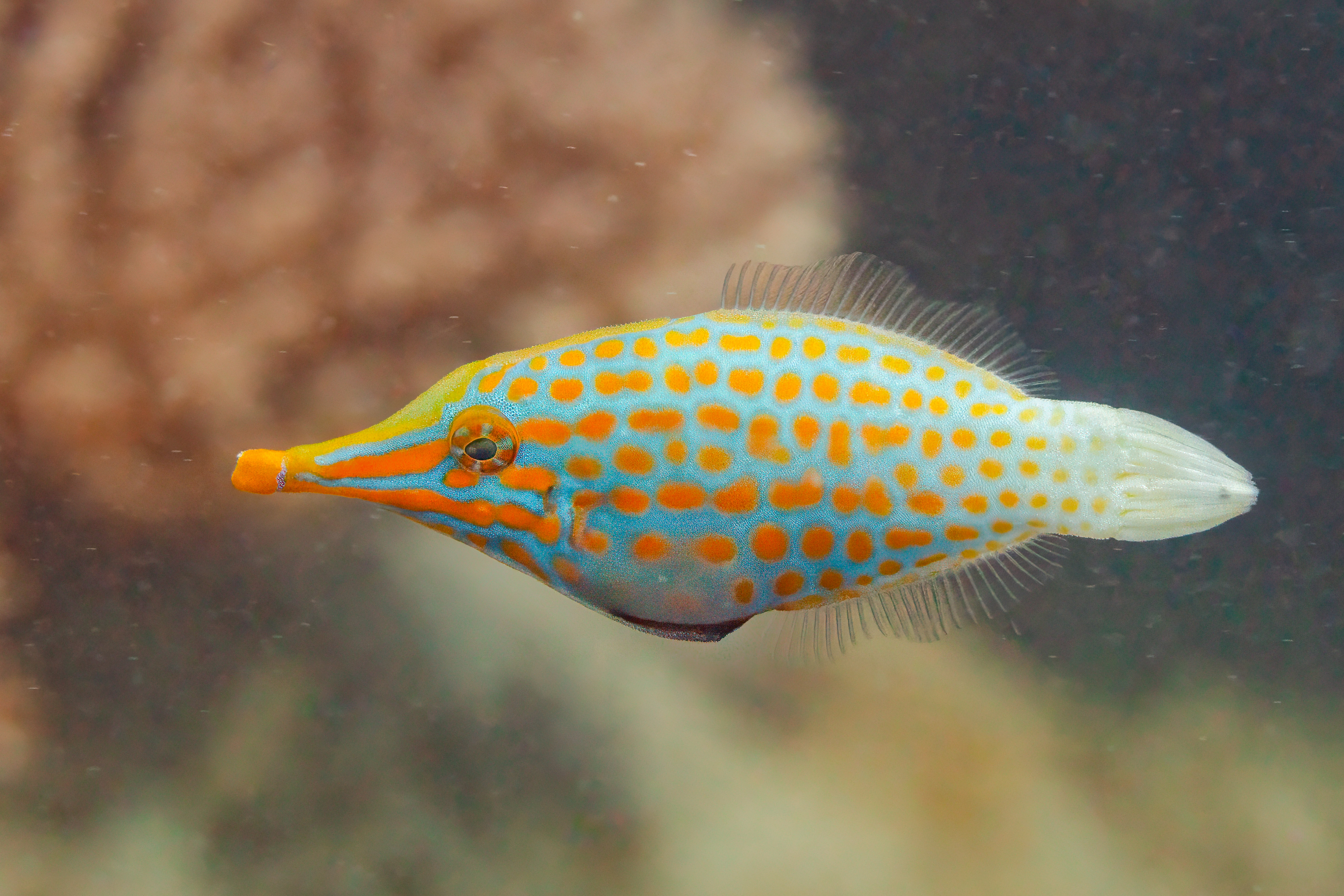

Conservation status
- Vulnerable (IUCN 3.1)

Scientific classification
- Kingdom: Animalia
- Phylum: Chordata
- Class: Actinopterygii
- Division: Teleostei
- Order: Tetraodontiformes
- Family: Monacanthidae
- Genus: Oxymonacanthus
- Species: O. longirostris

Binomial name
- Oxymonacanthus longirostris (Bloch & J. G. Schneider, 1801)

= Orange spotted filefish =

Species of fish

Oxymonacanthus longirostris, more commonly known as the orange spotted filefish, is a small marine reef fish in the family Monacanthidae. Other common names they are known by include the harlequin filefish and the longnose filefish.

== Distribution ==
Orange spotted filefish can be found in the Indo-Pacific, on shallow coral reefs. Two of the main things that account for the distribution of this species of fish are the availability of branching coral and coral richness. Meaning that habitats with structural complexity and preferred prey availability, such as Acropora, are key factors for habitat selection.

== Description ==
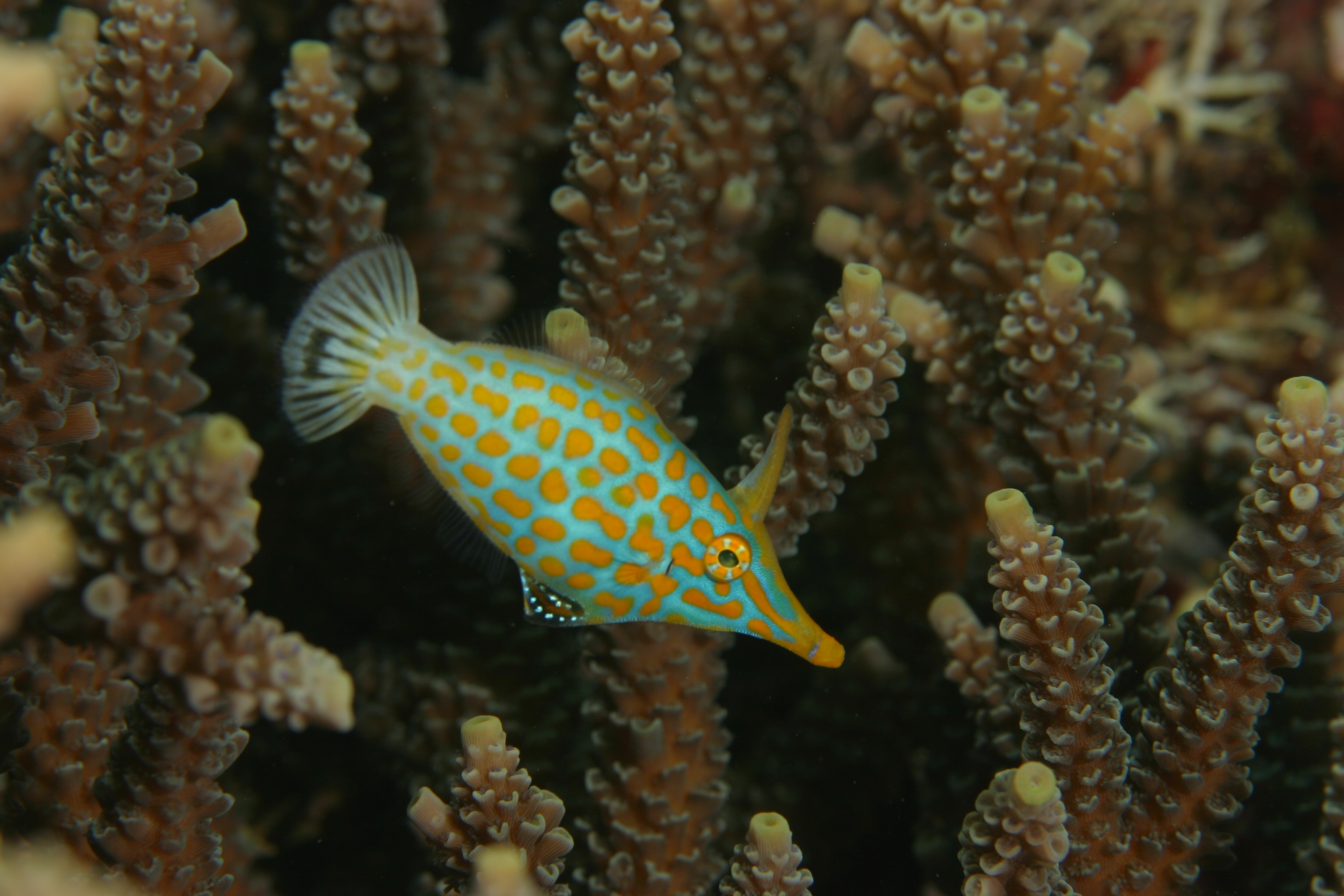
Showing fully spread caudal fin

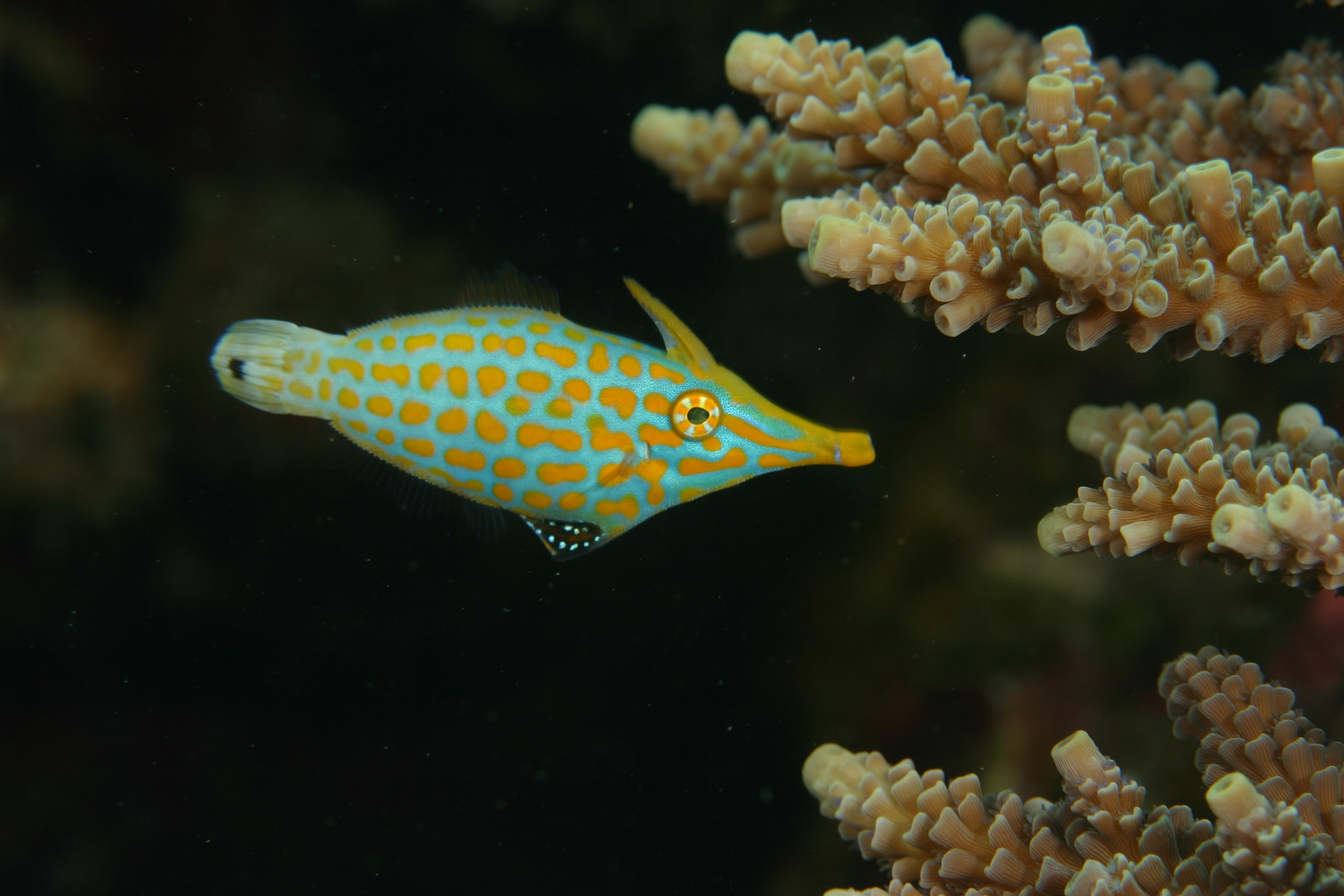
Showing fully extended pelvic fin spine

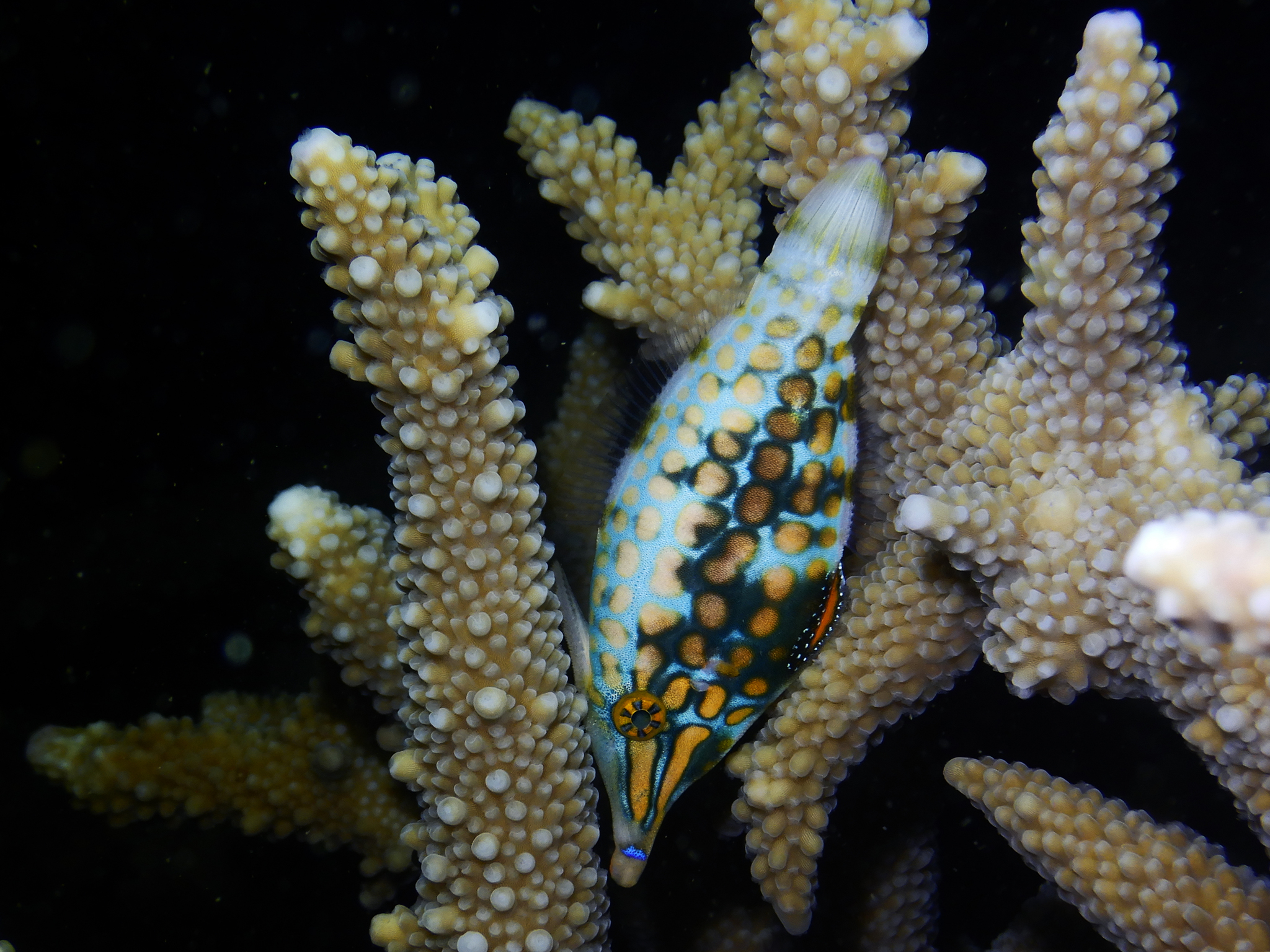
Sleeping, showing nocturnal colouration

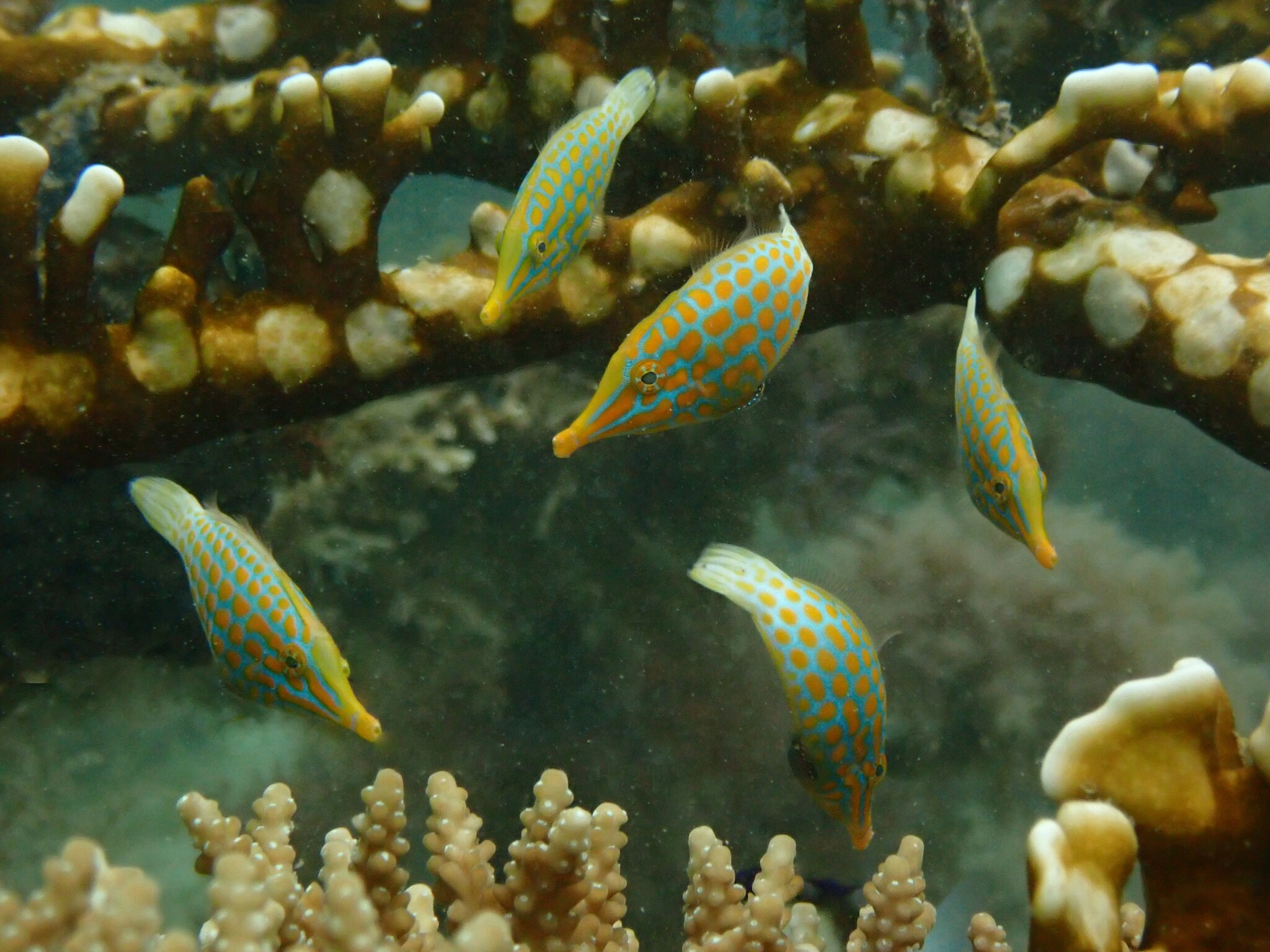
Group, in Kenya

As its common name suggests, this fish has bright orange spots all over its blueish, greenish skin. Even their eyes have some orange lines present. Their tail is pale with a distinguishing black spot; however, the black spot disappears when the caudal fin flares out. Instead of paired pelvic fins, it has a pelvic flap that is bordered in black and has white spots, reduced pelvic rays, and a lack of pelvic spines. It has an elongated dorsal and anal fin, and its pectoral fins are very reduced. Their large anal and dorsal fin aids in locomotion through coordinated undulation or oscillation. The snout of O. longirostris is elongated and has a small mouth opening at the tip. Their teeth are fused and form a hooked beak structure with a tooth flanking on either side.

Male and female O. longirostris are about the same size, typically ranging in length from 42mm to 75mm. They also show slight sexual dimorphism as males are a slightly darker blue-green color and their pelvic flap has a bright orange ornamented area, while the female's ornamented area in their pelvic flap is a duller orange color and a lot smaller or even lacking.

== Biology ==
Orange spotted filefish are specialists that primarily eat Acropora coral. Among the different species of Acropora, A. millepora is the preferred coral, followed by A. hyacinthus. Even if other species of corals are present and more abundant, O. longirostris will still choose to eat their preferred species of coral. Research on feeding preference affecting reproduction suggests that pairs that feed on the preferred corals spawn more often, while those that feed on non-preferred corals show reductions in body weight and gonad conditions. They prefer to feed on larger polyps and corals with less skeletal protection. They will occasionally feed on corals such as Porites and Heliopora, which have smaller corallites than the Acropora, and some types of algae. They forage throughout the day, although less in the evenings. Their foraging movements consist of a quick lunge toward a coral followed by a quick rebound away from the coral.

Research has highlighted that, based on their feeding selectivity patterns, they make active feeding choices to increase foraging efficiency. For example, in an experiment done, when food accessibility is normal, O. longirostris selected individual polyps that are centralized in a branch, independent of the level or depth they are. However, when food accessibility was manipulated, they consistently foraged on the corallites that were on the shallow branches.

O. longirostris is monogamous. The female and male pairs stay together while they mate and reproduce repeatedly. Those that do not form pairs are often found in groups of three, although there can be groups of up to five O. longirostris. Reproduction begins with a very long pre-spawning ritual that involves many thrusts on tufts of algae. The female moves from tuft to tuft, thrusting a few times while the male follows her. The male will also thrust, but less so than the female. After some time going in between tufts, the female will focus on one tuft and thrust repeatedly. The male will also thrust and then nuzzle the female with its snout. They both then drop into the algae, where they spawn, and the female finally finishes ovipositing. This process can take as long as an hour, sometimes more. Females can lay over 300 eggs.

Intraspecific aggression is known to be common among the filefishes. Some of the aggressive behaviors they exhibit include displaying their fins spread out, flutter diving, charging towards an opponent, and ramming into an opponent. This behavior is most likely to occur while pairs are attempting to spawn. Usually, males will fight with males and females will fight with females.

When sleeping, they can be found descended into coral in a head-down position during the night hours.

Orange spotted filefish absorb and use chemicals in the Acropora coral they eat to take on its smell, which cloaks them from natural predators like cod. In addition to this trait, not observed among other vertebrates, they also use visual camouflage.

== Conservation status ==
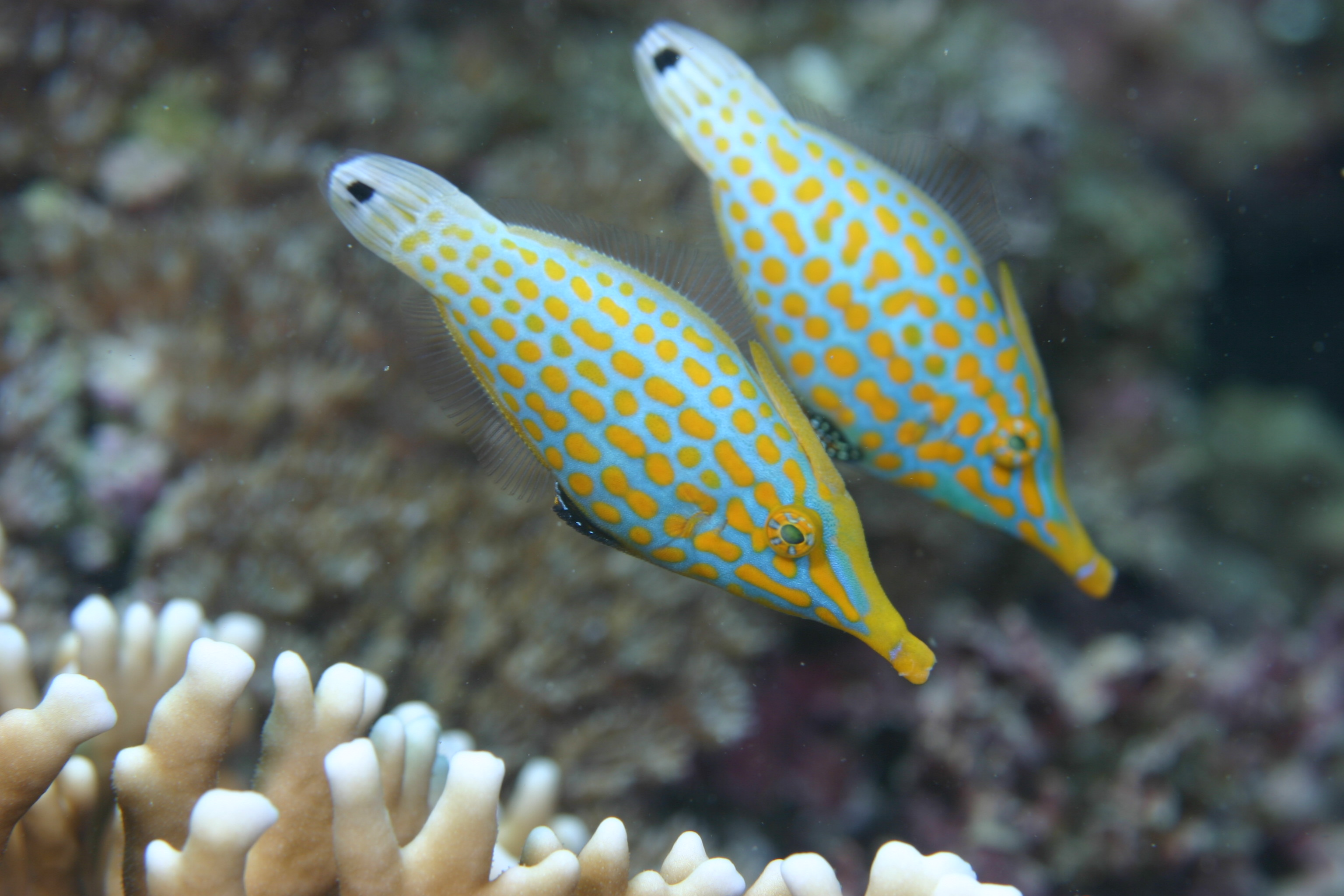
Orange spotted filefish

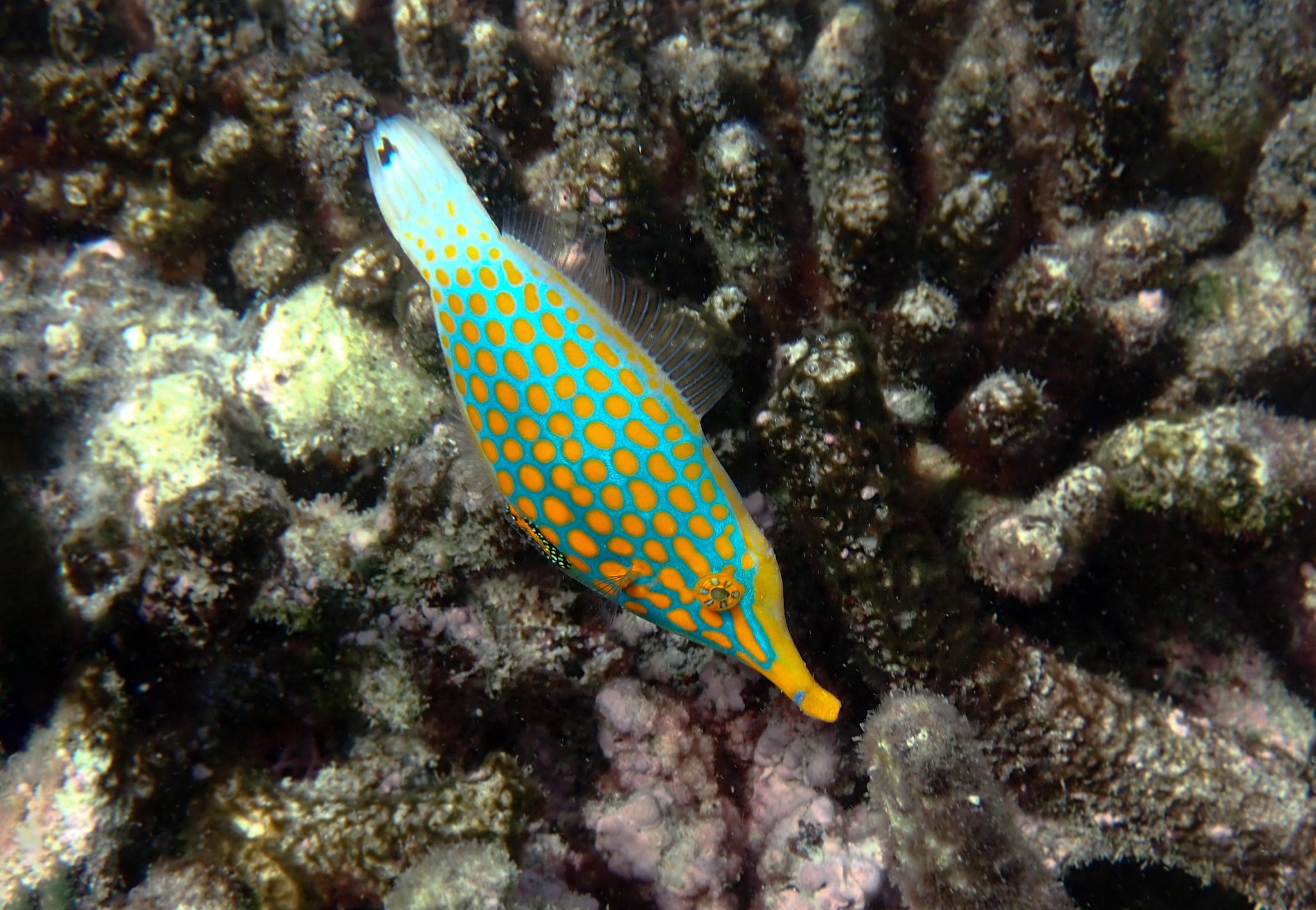
In Queensland, Australia

According to the IUCN Red List of Threatened Species, O. longirostris is considered a vulnerable species with a declining population. Since O. longirostris are specialist feeders, feeding primarily on A. millepora, their population relies heavily on the population of their food preferences. Due to global warming, bleaching events in coral reefs have affected the preferred coral of the orange spotted filefish, leading to their decreased populations and even local extinctions. One of those local extinctions came to be in Christmas Island, located in the Indian Ocean, as they no longer appeared when surveys were done. However, one O. longirostris was observed at a monitoring site on Christmas Island in 2011. Surprisingly, it was observed foraging almost entirely on P. verrucosa. On the other hand, there is research that highlights that the orange spotted filefish continues to prefer bleached A. millepora over other healthy corals available to them.

One of the bleaching events that severely affected populations of O. longirostris was the bleaching event of the summer of 1998 in the Japanese coral reefs. After this event, their growth and survival rate were reported to be drastically lower than they were the year before, due to the decrease in quality and quantity of food. This event also affected their breeding, as their breeding season ended a month earlier than usual.

According to the UNEP World Conservation Monitoring Centre, the orange spotted filefish is a popular aquarium fish and is commonly traded as an ornamental marine fish for aquariums despite being characterized as an unsuitable fish due to its specialized diet. Their preferred food source, the Acropora, is also heavily traded.

There are no current conservation efforts specifically for Oxymonacanthus longirostris.

== In the aquarium ==
They are often offered for sale in the aquarium trade, but few survive long in captivity. They are difficult to maintain in an aquarium unless provided with live corals. They must be kept in species-specific tanks, or tanks with very passive tankmates such as seahorses or pipefish. They have been successfully bred in captivity.
