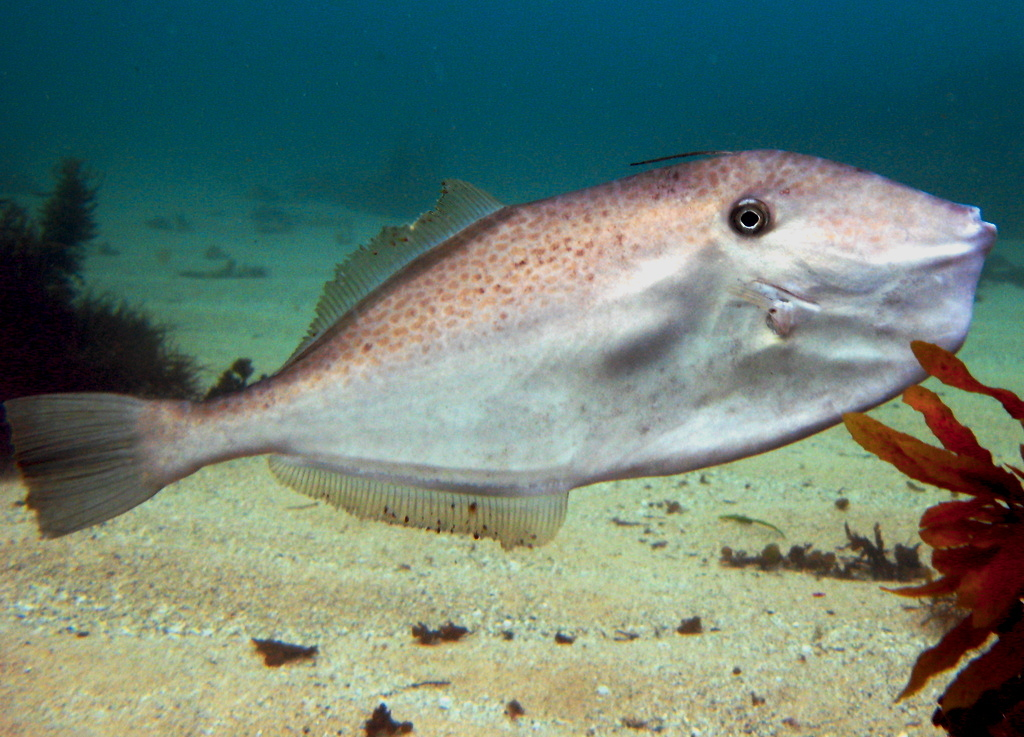
- Aluterus monoceros

Scientific classification
- Kingdom: Animalia
- Phylum: Chordata
- Class: Actinopterygii
- Division: Teleostei
- Order: Tetraodontiformes
- Family: Monacanthidae
- Genus: Aluterus; Cloquet, 1816

Synonyms
- Davidia Miranda Ribeiro

= Aluterus =

Aluterus Temporal range: Middle Miocene–present

Genus of fishes

Aluterus is a genus of filefishes. This genus is larger-bodied than many other monacanthids, with Aluterus scriptus being the largest filefish species, reaching 1.1 metres (3 ft 7 in) in total length.

The ability of Aluterus to rapidly change color has often been observed, which primarily thought to be for camouflage. This ability has not yet been studied scientifically.

== Taxonomy ==
There are currently 4 recognized extant species in this genus:

Species	Common name	Image
Aluterus heudelotii Hollard, 1855	Dotterel filefish	
Aluterus monoceros Linnaeus, 1758	Unicorn leatherjacket filefish	
Aluterus schoepfii Walbaum, 1792	Orange filefish	
Aluterus scriptus Osbeck, 1765	Scribbled leatherjacket filefish	

The fossil species †Aluterus shigensis Miyajima, Koike & Matsuoka, 2014 is known from the Middle Miocene of Nagano, Japan.

The following cladogram is based on a 2016 molecular study of filefish and triggerfish (Balistidae):

- Aluterus
  - Aluterus monoceros
  - - Aluterus scriptus
    - - Aluterus heudelotii
      - Aluterus schoepfii
- - Oxymonacanthus
  - - Monacanthus
    - Stephanolepis
