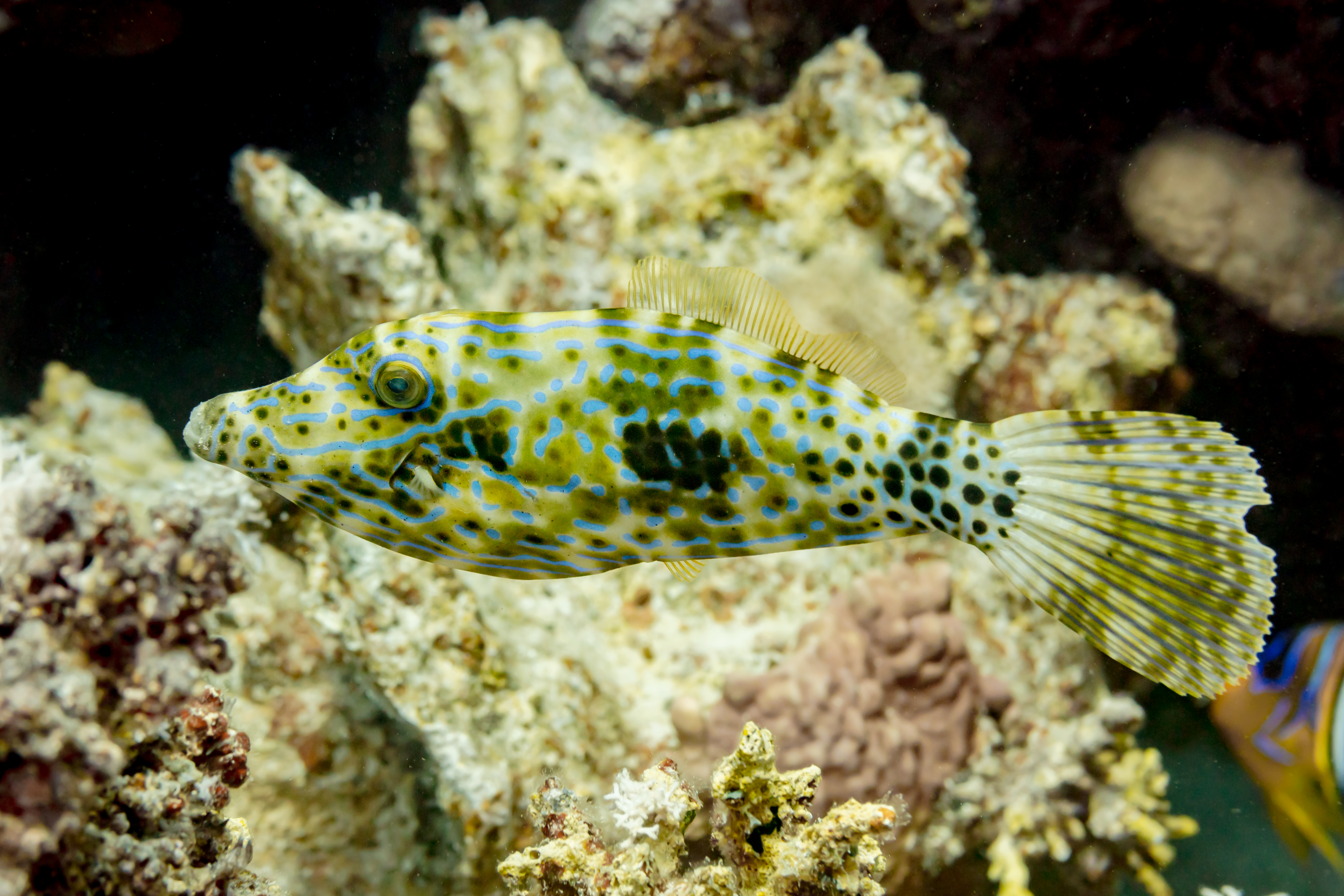
- A. scriptus, Red Sea, Egypt
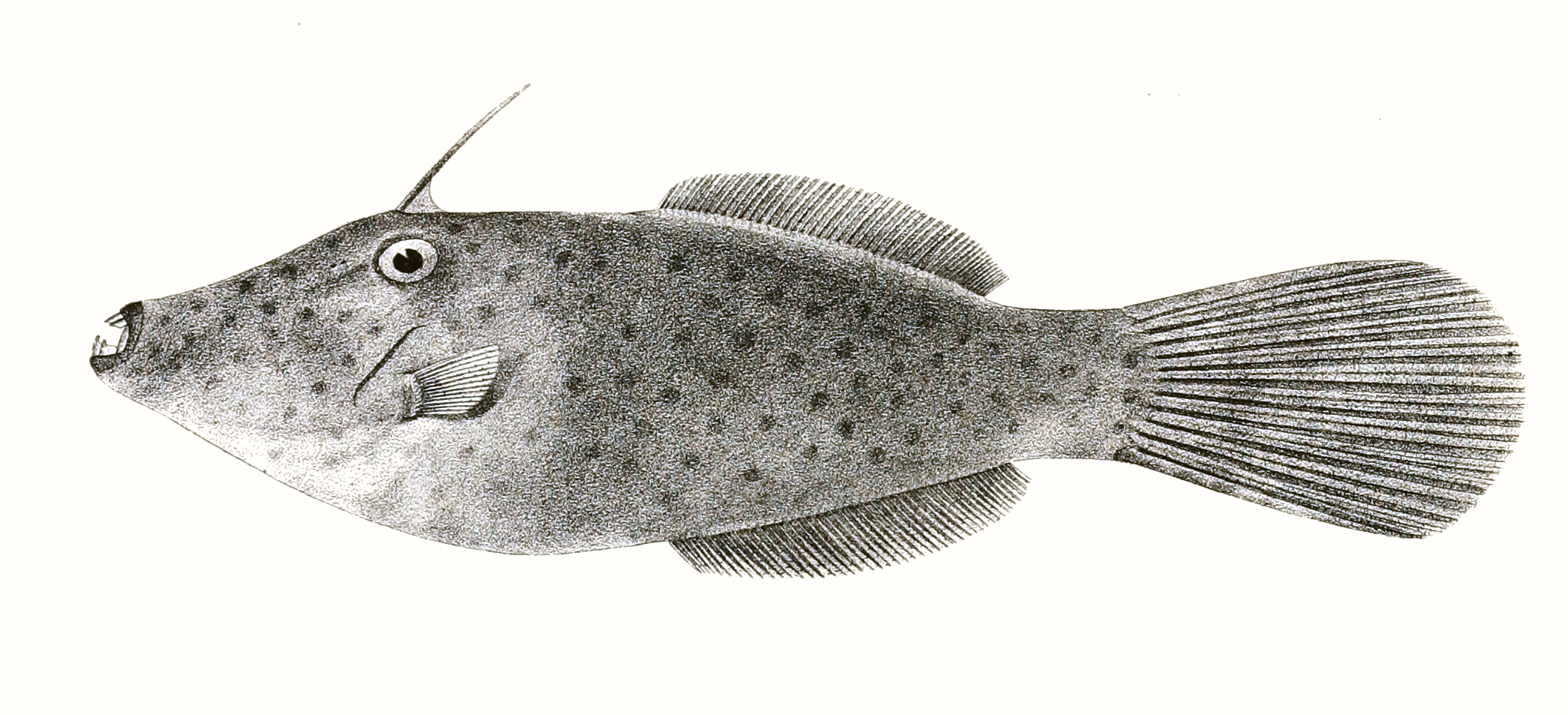

Conservation status
- Least Concern (IUCN 3.1)

Scientific classification
- Kingdom: Animalia
- Phylum: Chordata
- Class: Actinopterygii
- Order: Tetraodontiformes
- Family: Monacanthidae
- Genus: Aluterus
- Species: A. scriptus

Binomial name
- Aluterus scriptus (Osbeck, 1765)

= Aluterus scriptus =

Species of fish

Aluterus scriptus, commonly known as scrawled filefish, broomtail filefish or scribbled leatherjacket, is a marine fish belonging to the family Monacanthidae.

== Distribution ==
This species has a circumtropical distribution; it can be found in the tropical waters from the Atlantic Ocean, the Indian Ocean and the Pacific Ocean.

== Habitat ==
This filefish can be observed in lagoons, coral and rocky reefs, seaweed fields, pinnacles, wrecks and also in open water.

== Description ==
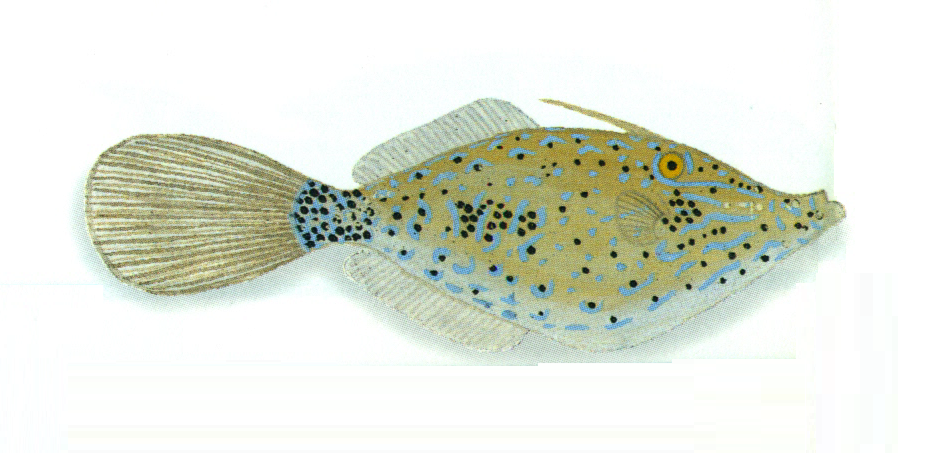
Artist representation of A. scriptus

Aluterus scriptus is a medium size fish which can grow up to 110 cm (3.6 ft) in length. The body shape looks like an elongated oval, strongly compressed. Its background body coloration is olive-brown or grey depending on its surrounding environment, irregular blue lines and spots are distributed on the body mixed with some black spots mainly on the head. The colors may quickly vary depending on background similar to an octopus's. Fish observed in the Virgin Islands might lie flat on the sand and become pure white or change to any of the other representative colors. The mouth is small and at the end of its pointed snout. Like all the Tetraodontiformes, it has no pelvic fin but has two particular dorsal spines; the first anterior one is long, slender and erectile, located just over the eyes, the second is small and not easy to see but it locks the first one when it is erected. The rounded caudal fin is quite long and can be displayed as a fan.

The juveniles have a yellow with black spots body coloration.

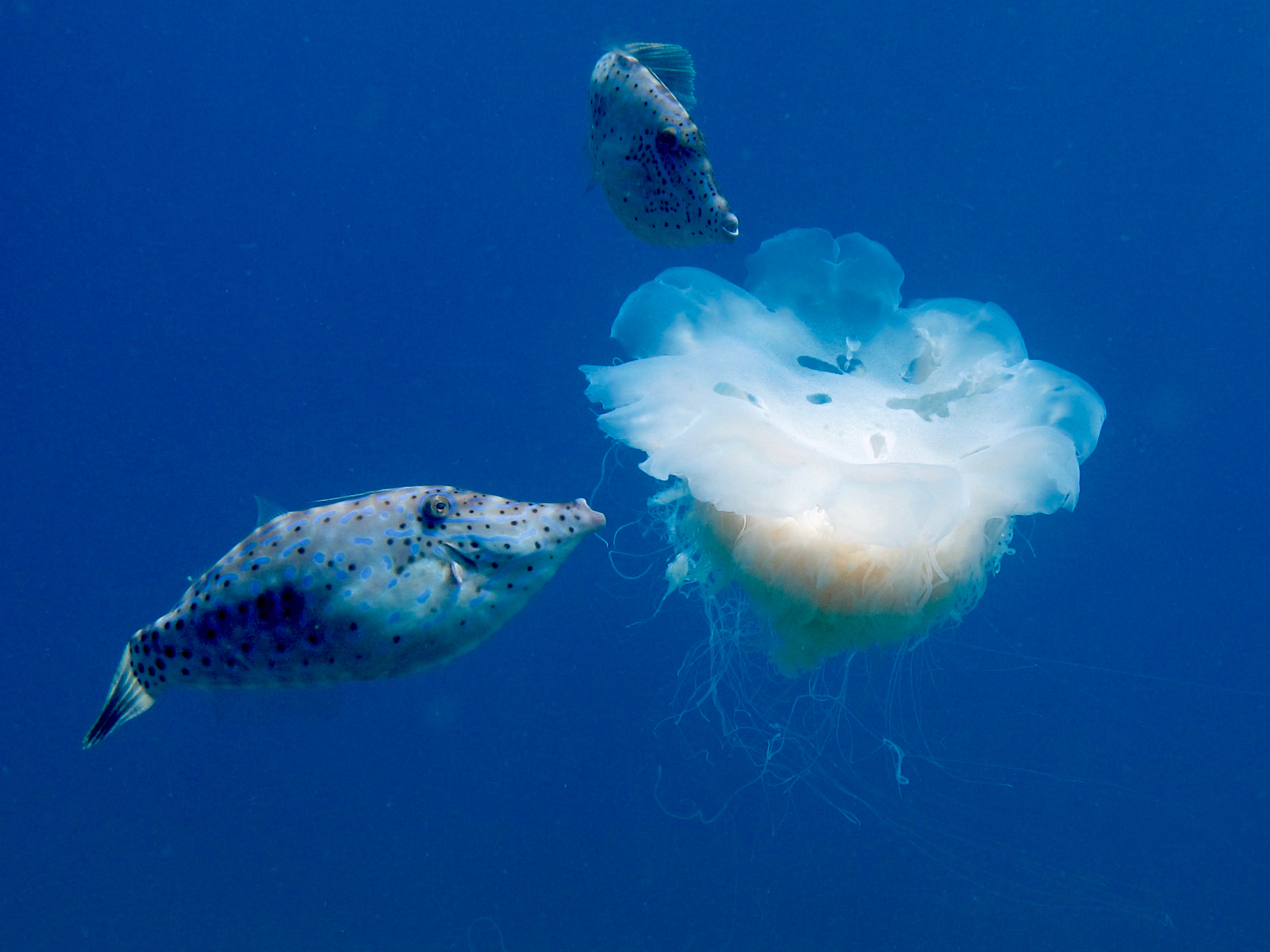
Feeding on a jellyfish, in the South China Sea

== Feeding ==
Aluterus scriptus is omnivorous and have a large choice for its meals like small crustaceans, algae, gorgonians, sea anemones, tunicates, fire coral, seagrasses and hydrozoans.

== Behaviour ==
Aluterus scriptus is diurnal and is demersal. It is solitary and shy with divers and is rarely seen with others.

== Toxin ==
It contains palytoxin, which is 50 times more toxic than tetrodotoxin, the poison of puffer fish.

== Gallery ==
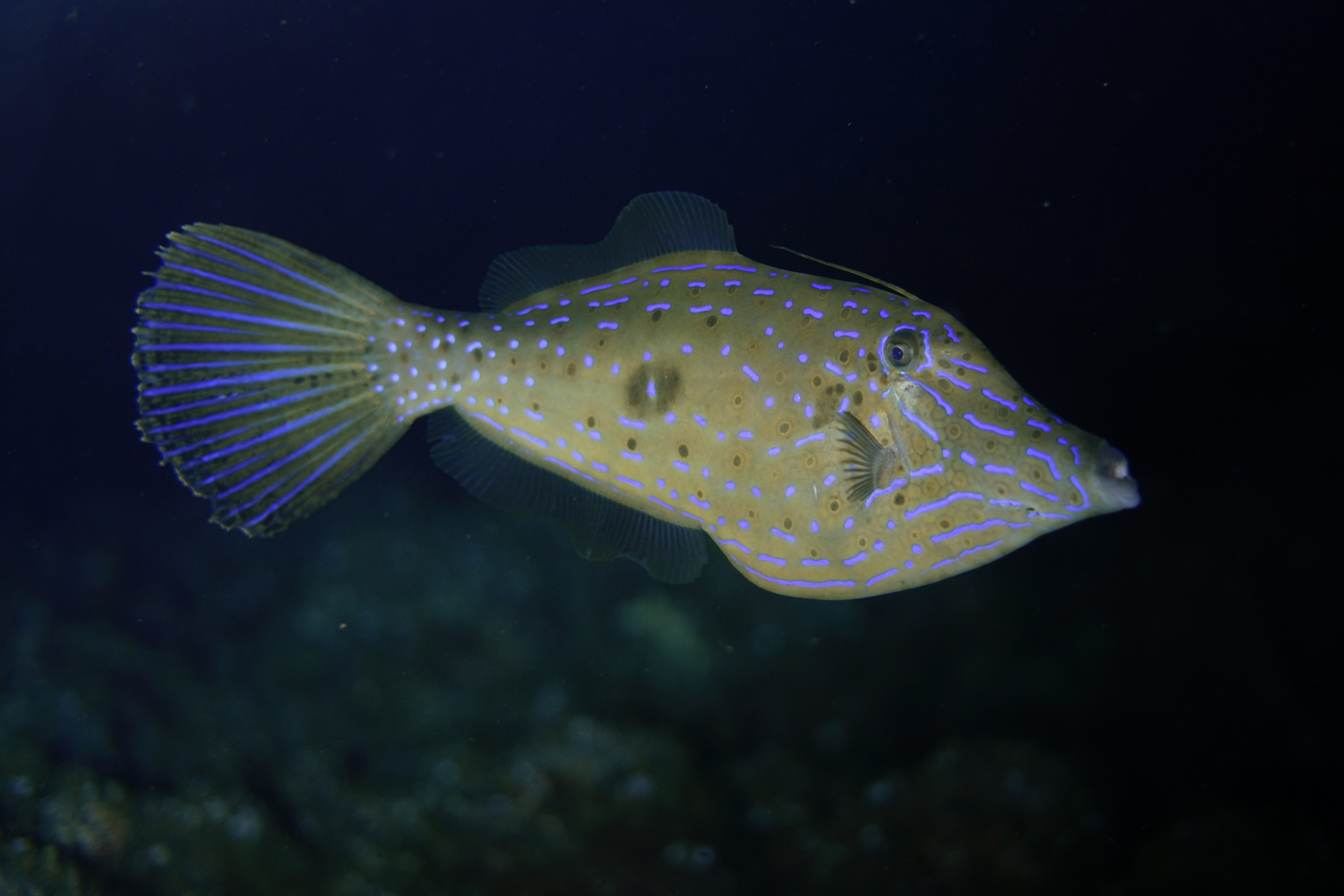
In Spain

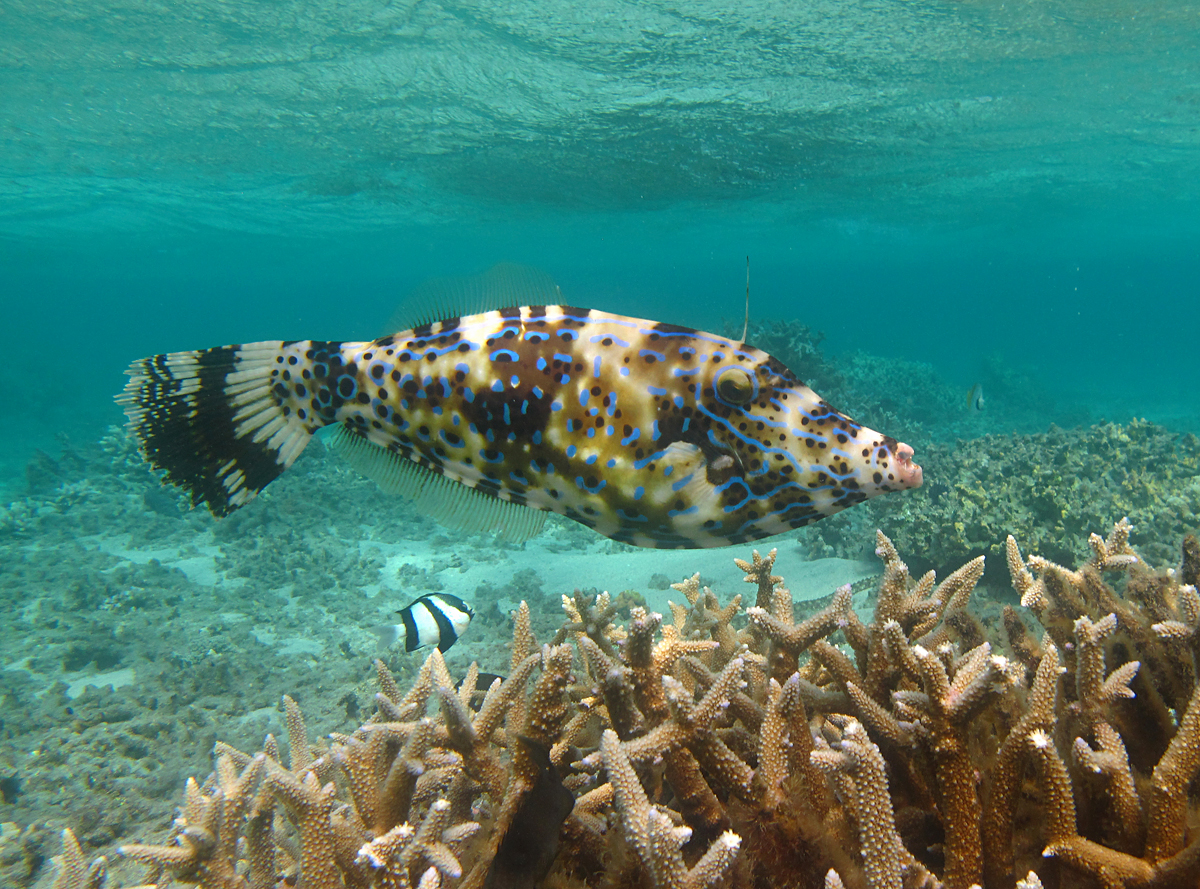
In the Indian Ocean, Réunion

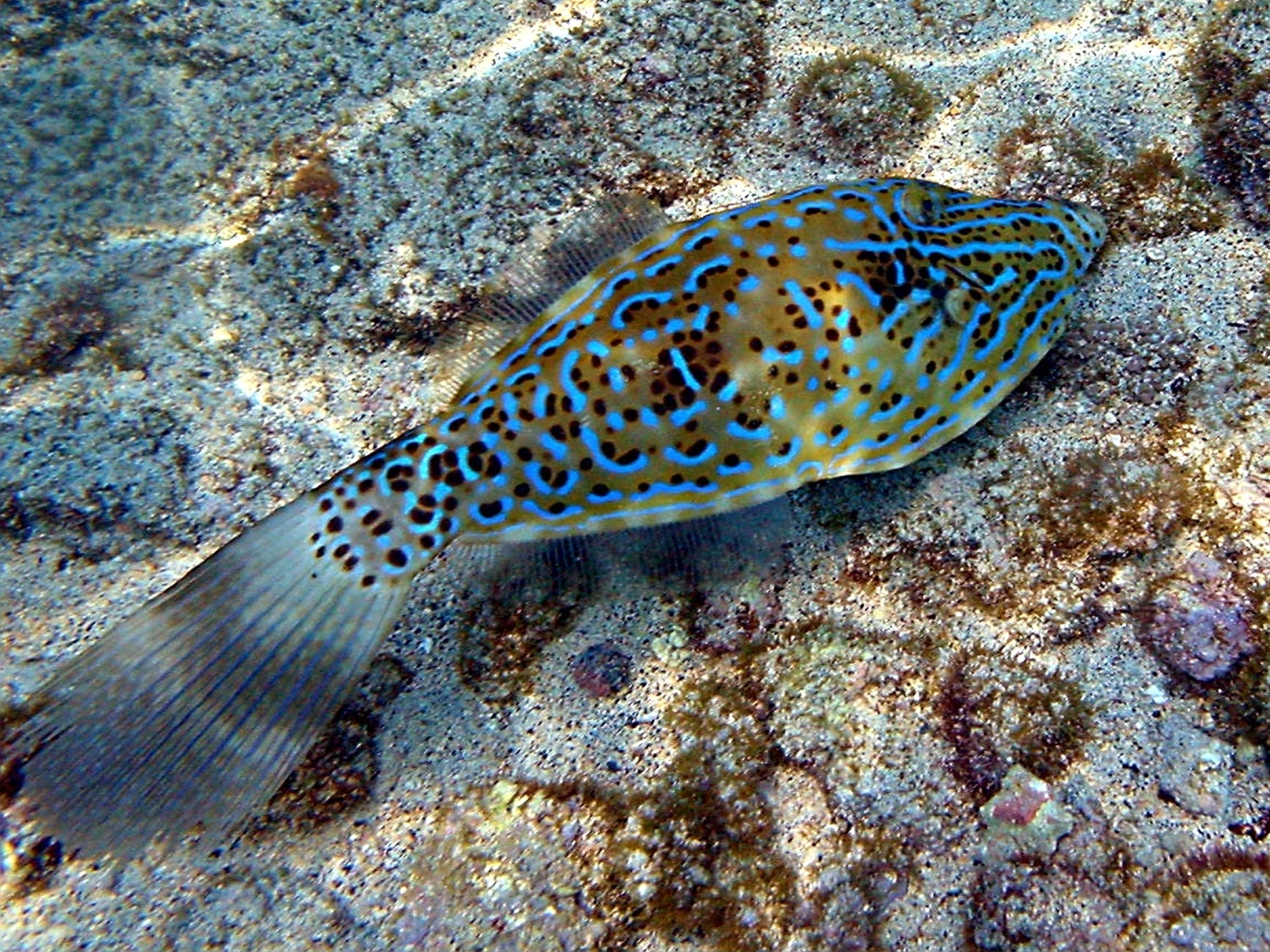
In the North Pacific, Hawaii

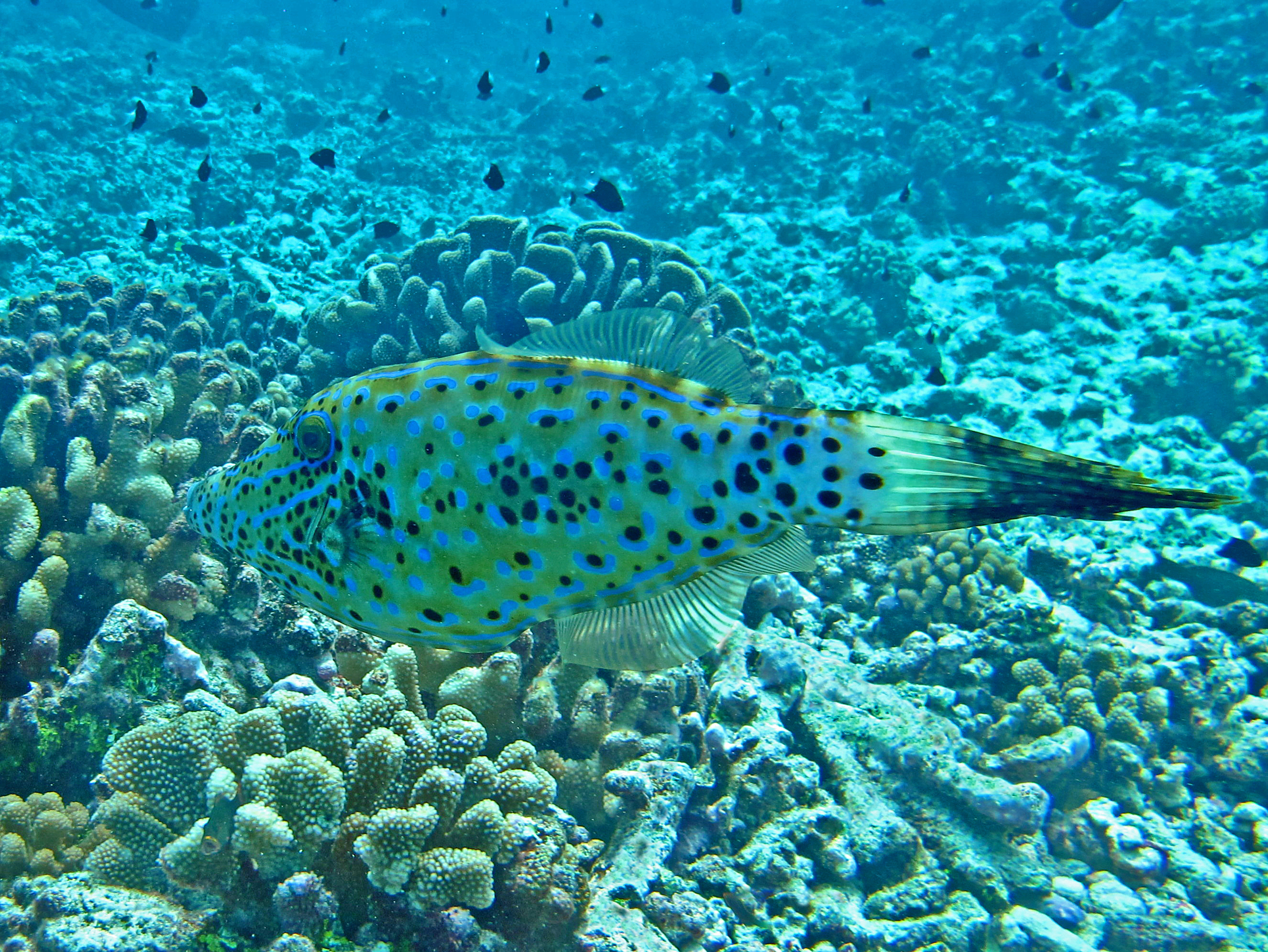
In French Polynesia

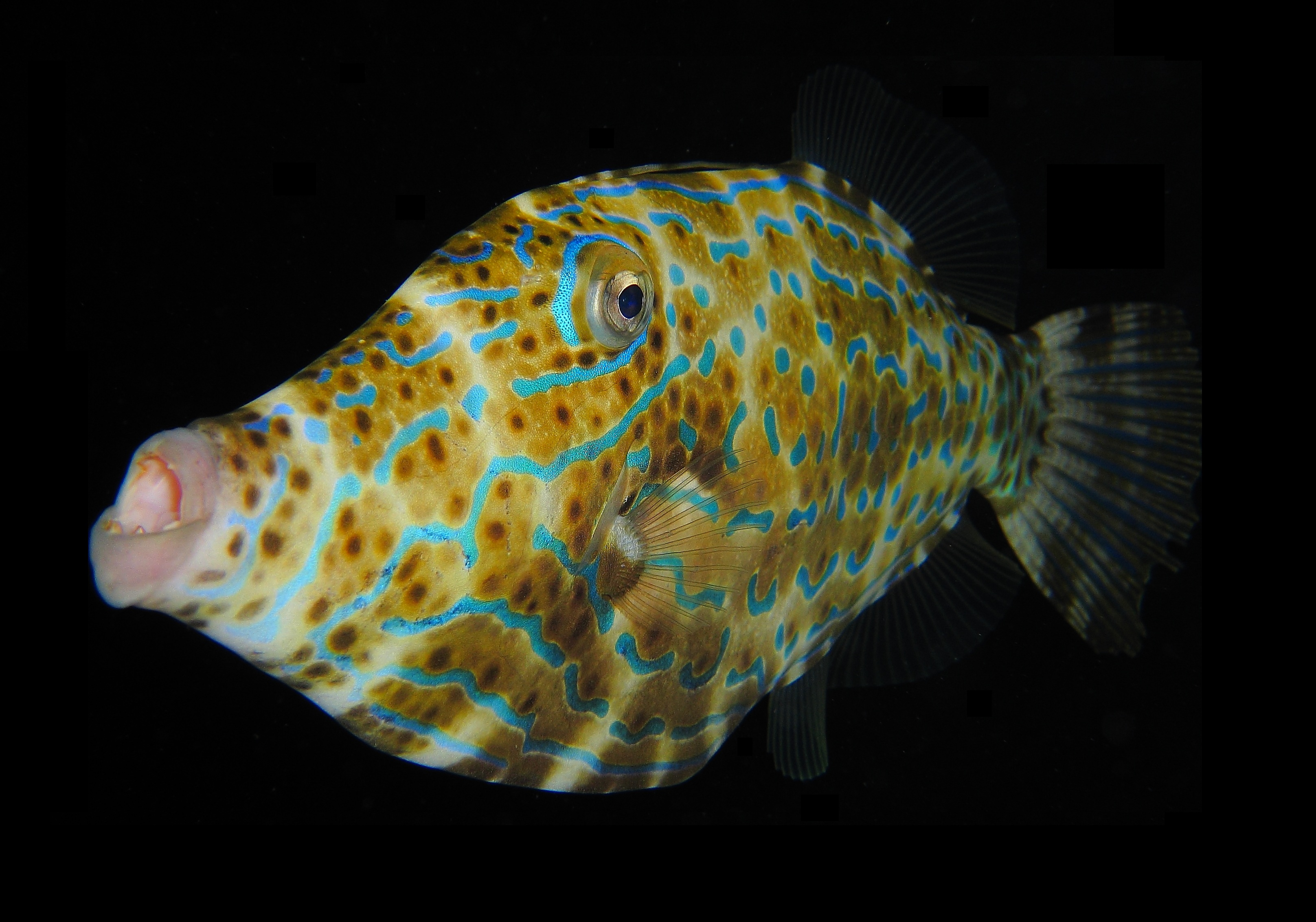
Close-up view

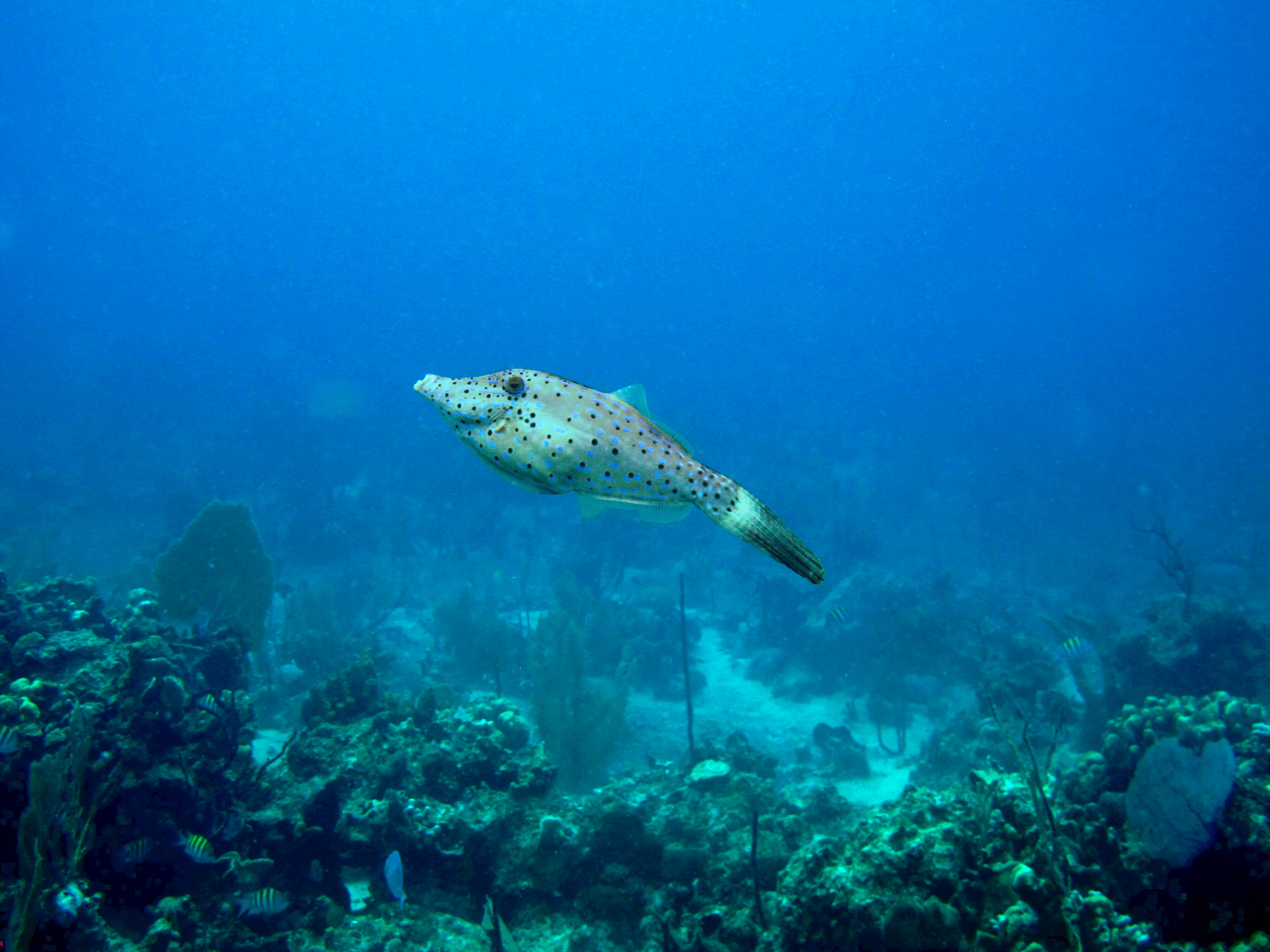
In the Caribbean Sea, Dominican Republic

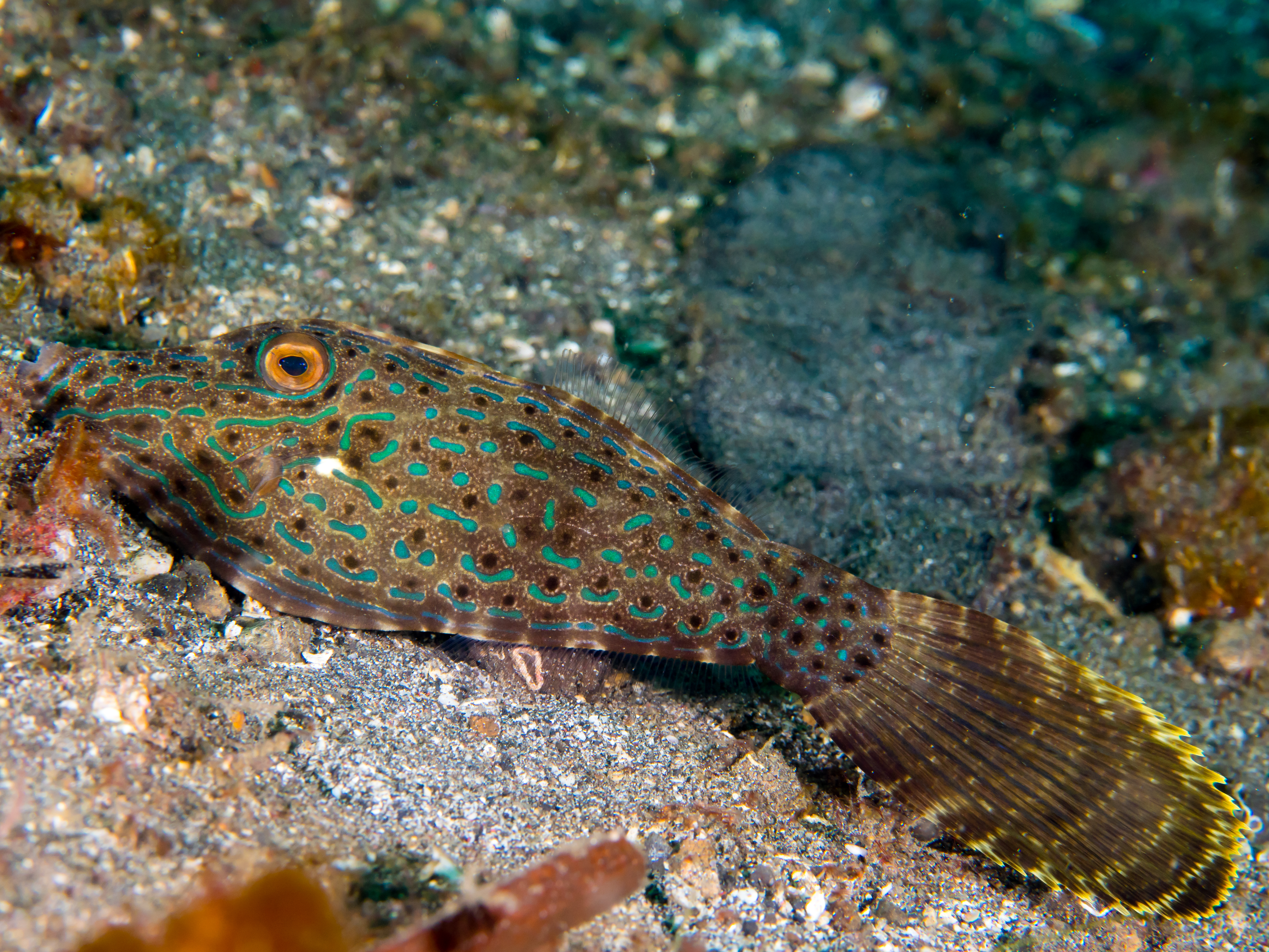
In Indonesia

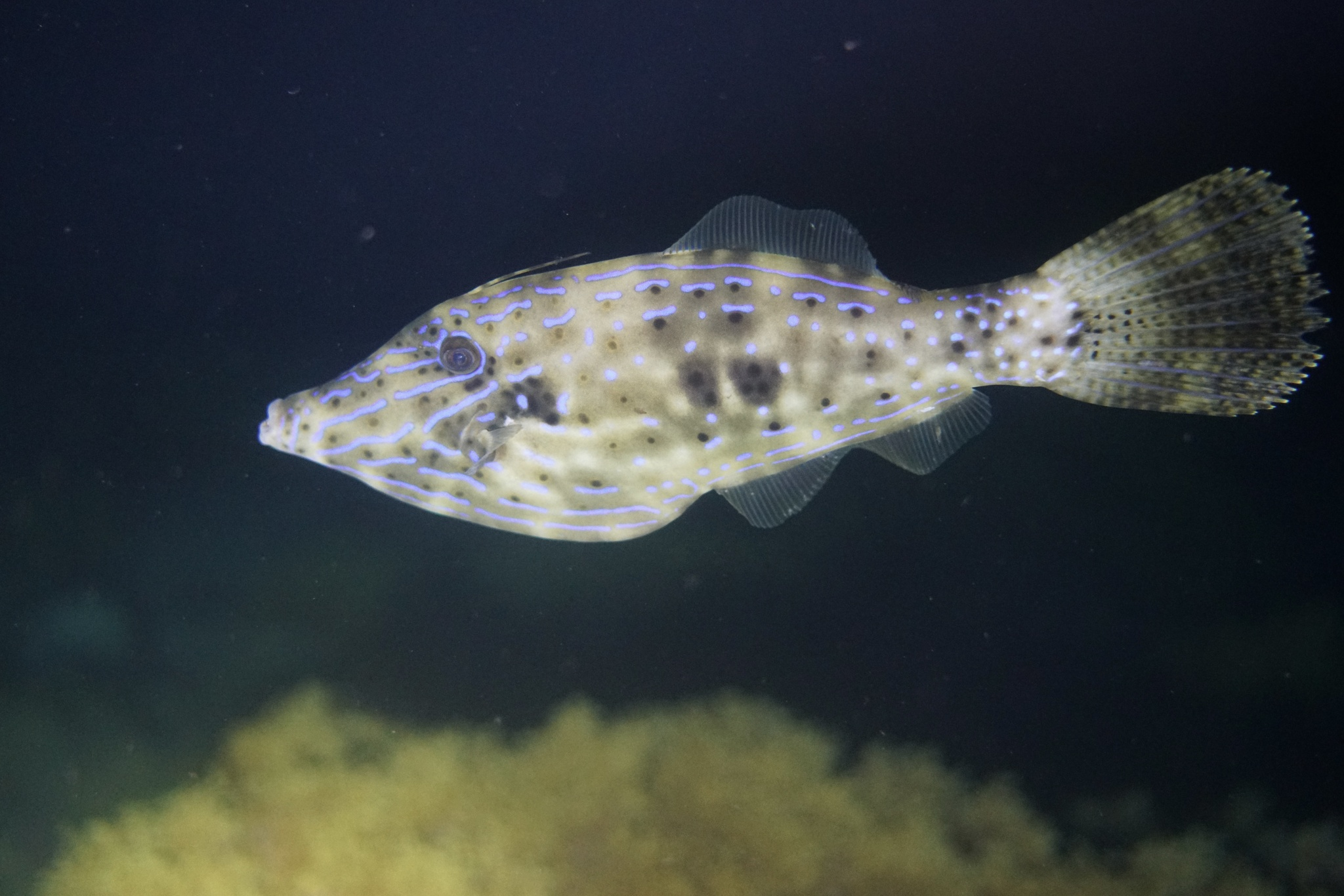
In Spain
