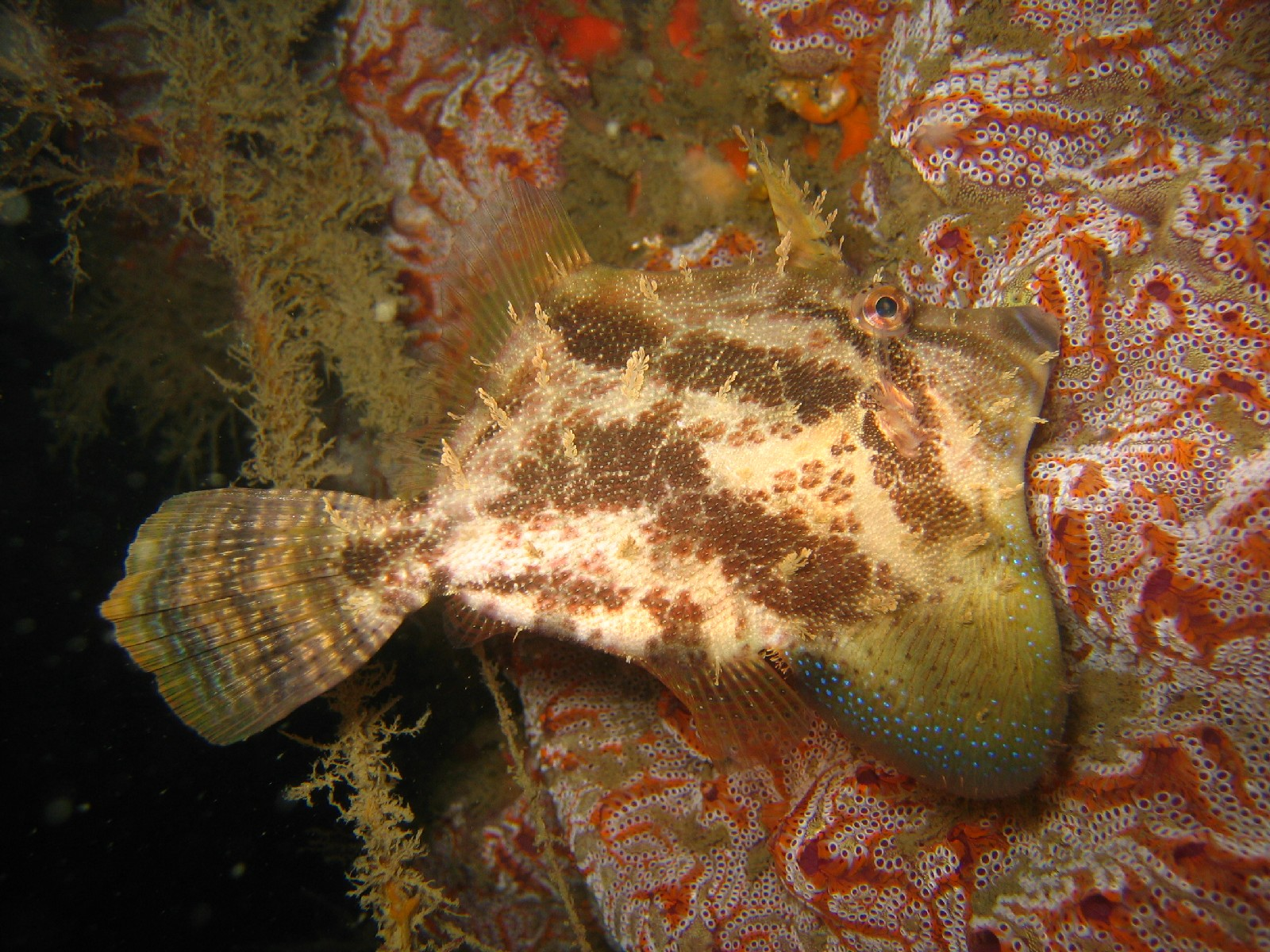

Scientific classification
- Kingdom: Animalia
- Phylum: Chordata
- Class: Actinopterygii
- Order: Tetraodontiformes
- Family: Monacanthidae
- Genus: Monacanthus
- Species: M. chinensis

Binomial name
- Monacanthus chinensis (Osbeck, 1765)

Synonyms
- Balistes chinensis Osbeck, 1765; Balistes granulosus Gronow, 1854; Balistes mylii Bory de Saint-Vincent, 1822; Monacanthus cantoris Bleeker, 1852; Monacanthus macrolepis Fraser-Brunner, 1941; Monacanthus mylii (Bory de Saint-Vincent, 1822)

= Monacanthus chinensis =

Species of fish

Monacanthus chinensis, commonly known as the fan-bellied leatherjacket or fantail leatherjacket, is a species of filefish native to the western Pacific Ocean and the eastern Indian Ocean where it is found on reefs and soft sediments at shallow depths. This species grows to a total length of 40 centimetres (16 in).

== Description ==
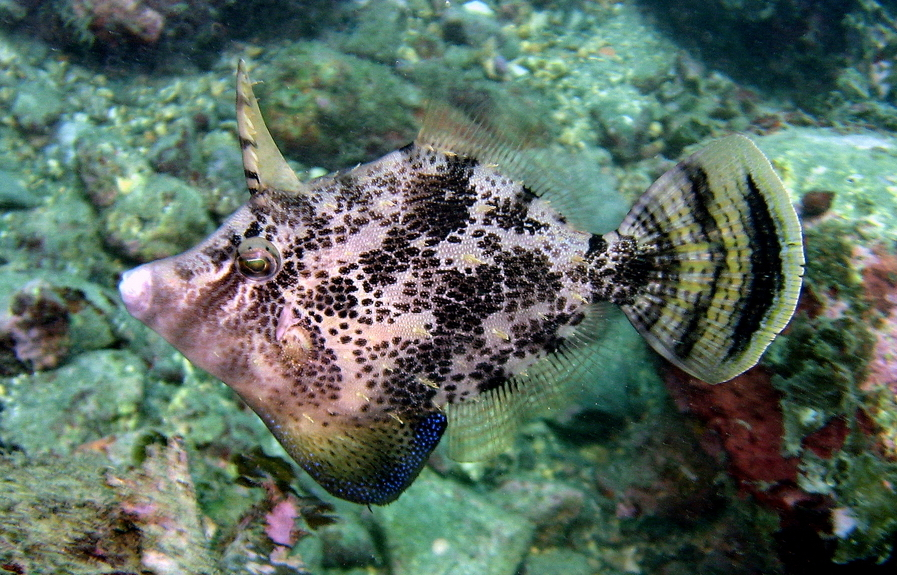
In Taiwan

The fan-bellied leatherjacket grows to a total length of about 40 centimetres (16 in). It is a laterally-compressed fish recognisable by the upturned, pointed snout, the filamentary extension on the fan-shaped caudal fin, and the large dewlap on the underside of the fish. The foremost dorsal fin consists of a long erectile spine with a shorter one behind it. The hindermost dorsal fin has 28 to 34 soft rays and the anal fin has 27 to 34 soft rays. The colour is variable depending on its environment, being dark when swimming over beds of mussels and cream or tan when above a sandy seabed. In each case there are irregular darker blotches and streaks.

== Distribution and habitat ==
The fan-bellied leatherjacket is native to the Indo-Pacific. Its range extends from Malaysia and southern Japan, through Indonesia and Samoa to western, northern and eastern Australia. It is a demersal species and is found in estuaries and on algae-clad rocky coasts as well as over muddy and silty seabeds, on seagrass meadows and on reefs, both on and offshore, to depths of about 50 m (164 ft).

== Biology ==
The fan-bellied leatherjacket is diurnal and omnivorous, appearing to detect its food by sight. Besides feeding on algae and seagrass, it preys on small invertebrates such as amphipods, caridean shrimps, copepods, tanaids, bryozoans, hydroids, polychaete worms and tunicates. It does not appear to digest seagrass and algae well, but nevertheless, many carbon compounds are assimilated from these foodstuffs during the digestion process. About 40% of the diet is animal matter, and this species is very dependent on encrusting organisms and the epiphytic algae and invertebrates present in a seagrass meadow.

== Gallery ==
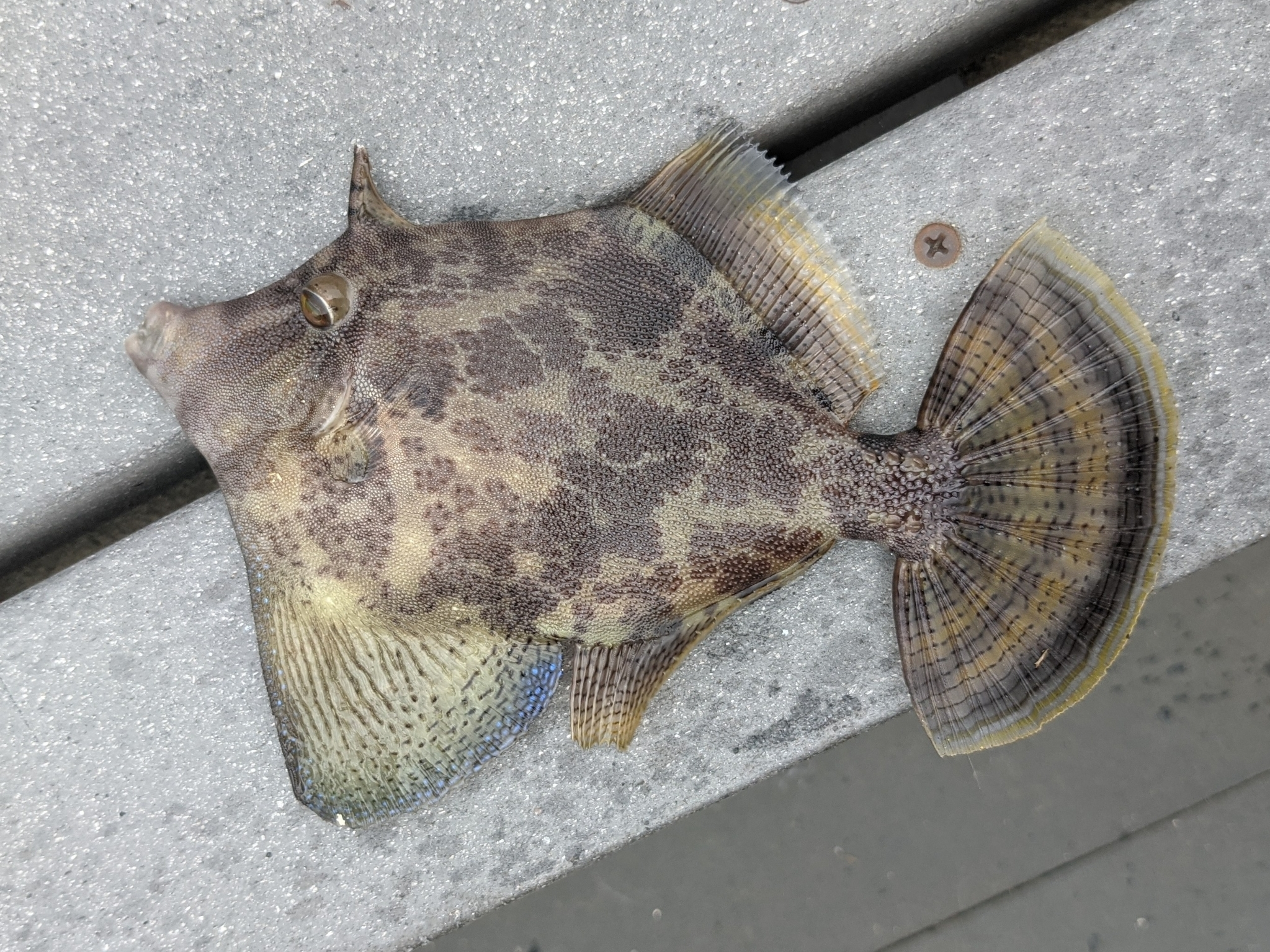
In Hong Kong

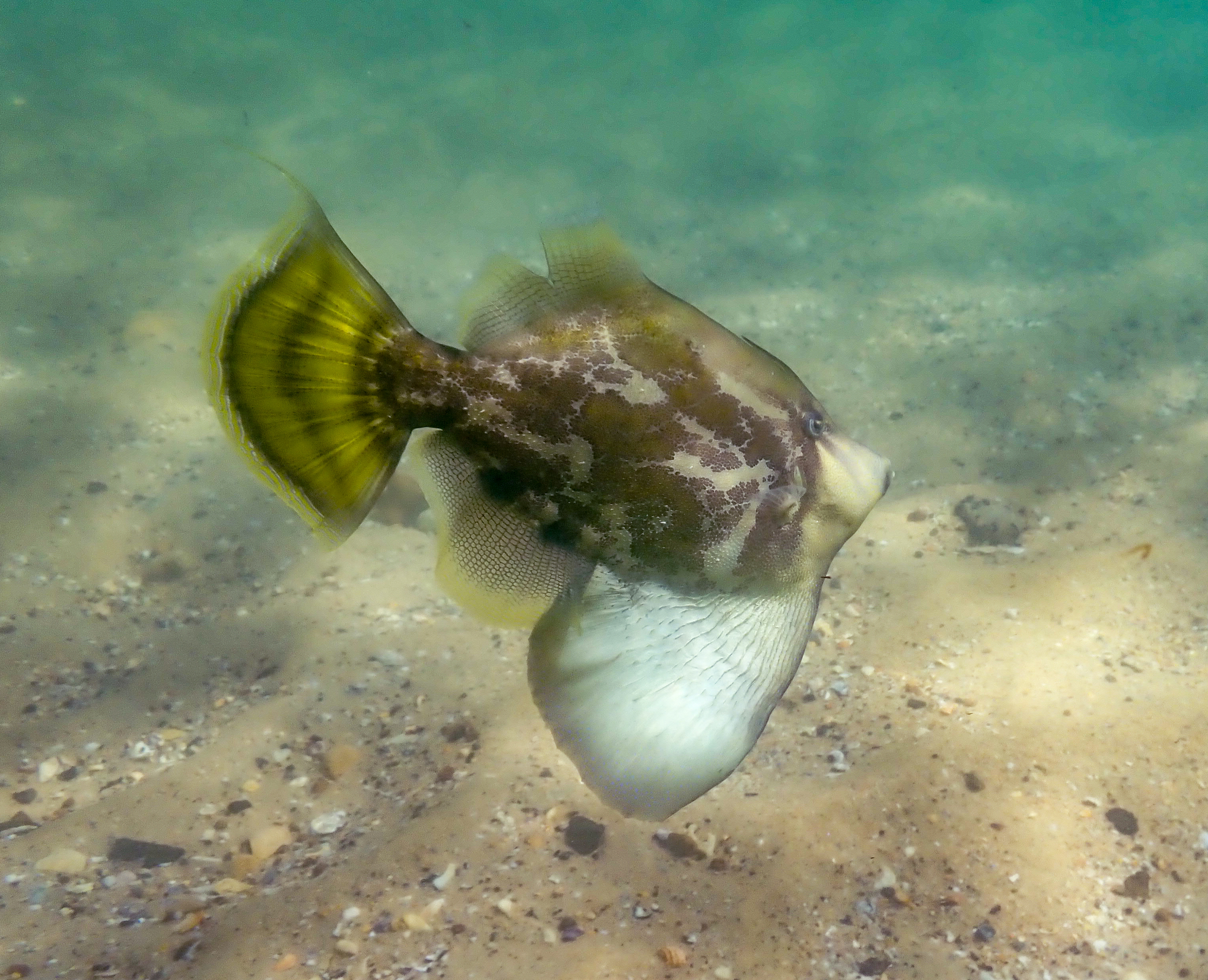
In Australia

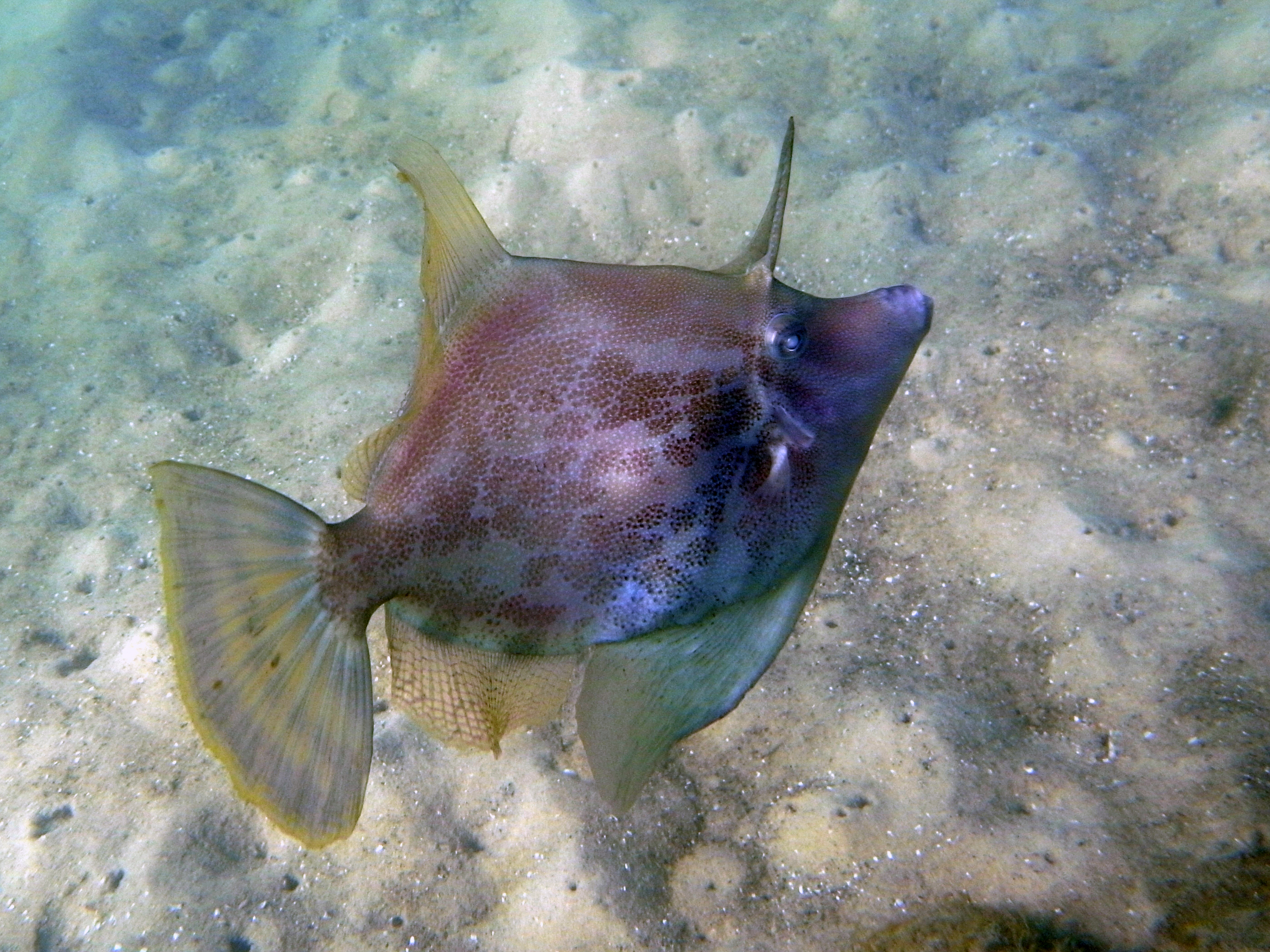
In Australia
