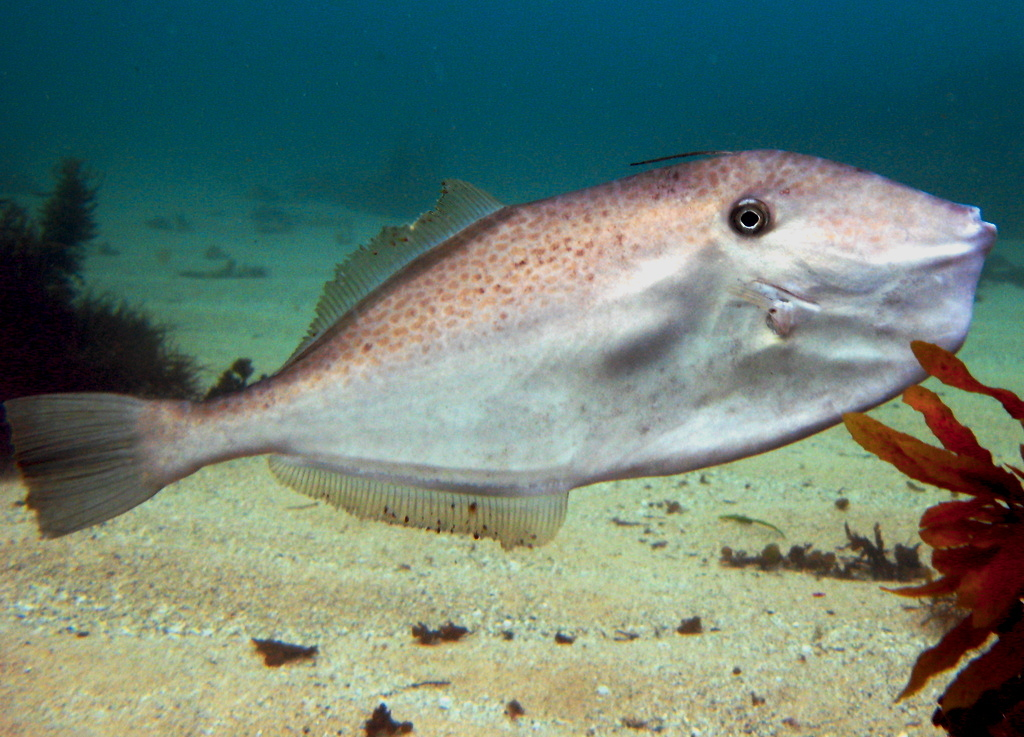

Conservation status
- Least Concern (IUCN 3.1)

Scientific classification
- Kingdom: Animalia
- Phylum: Chordata
- Class: Actinopterygii
- Order: Tetraodontiformes
- Family: Monacanthidae
- Genus: Aluterus
- Species: A. monoceros

Binomial name
- Aluterus monoceros (Linnaeus, 1758)
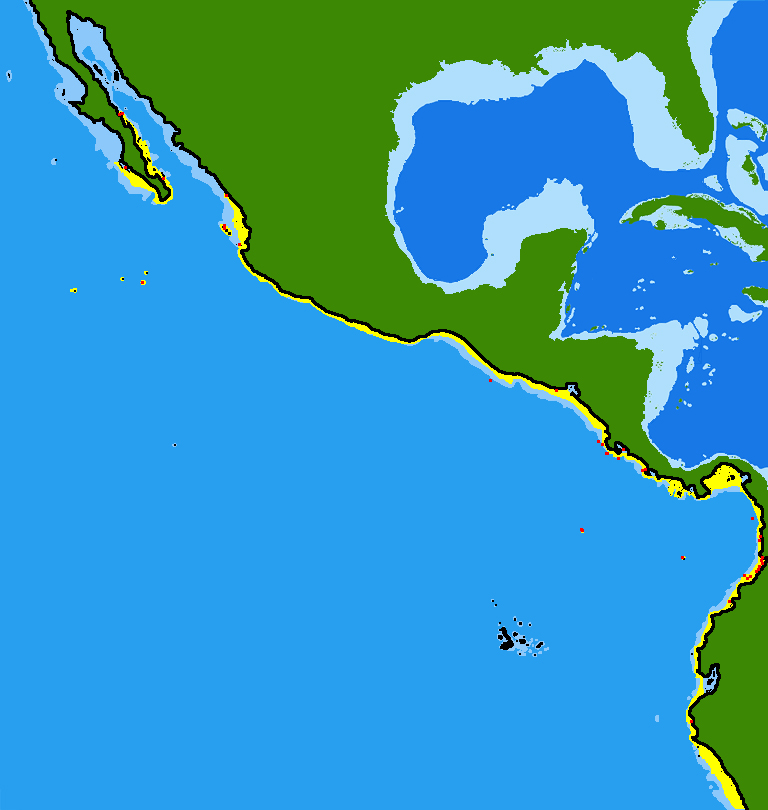

= Unicorn leatherjacket =

Species of fish

The unicorn leatherjacket (Aluterus monoceros) is a filefish of the family Monacanthidae, found around the world in subtropical oceans between latitudes 43° N and 35° S, at depths down to 50 m. Its length is up to 76 cm.

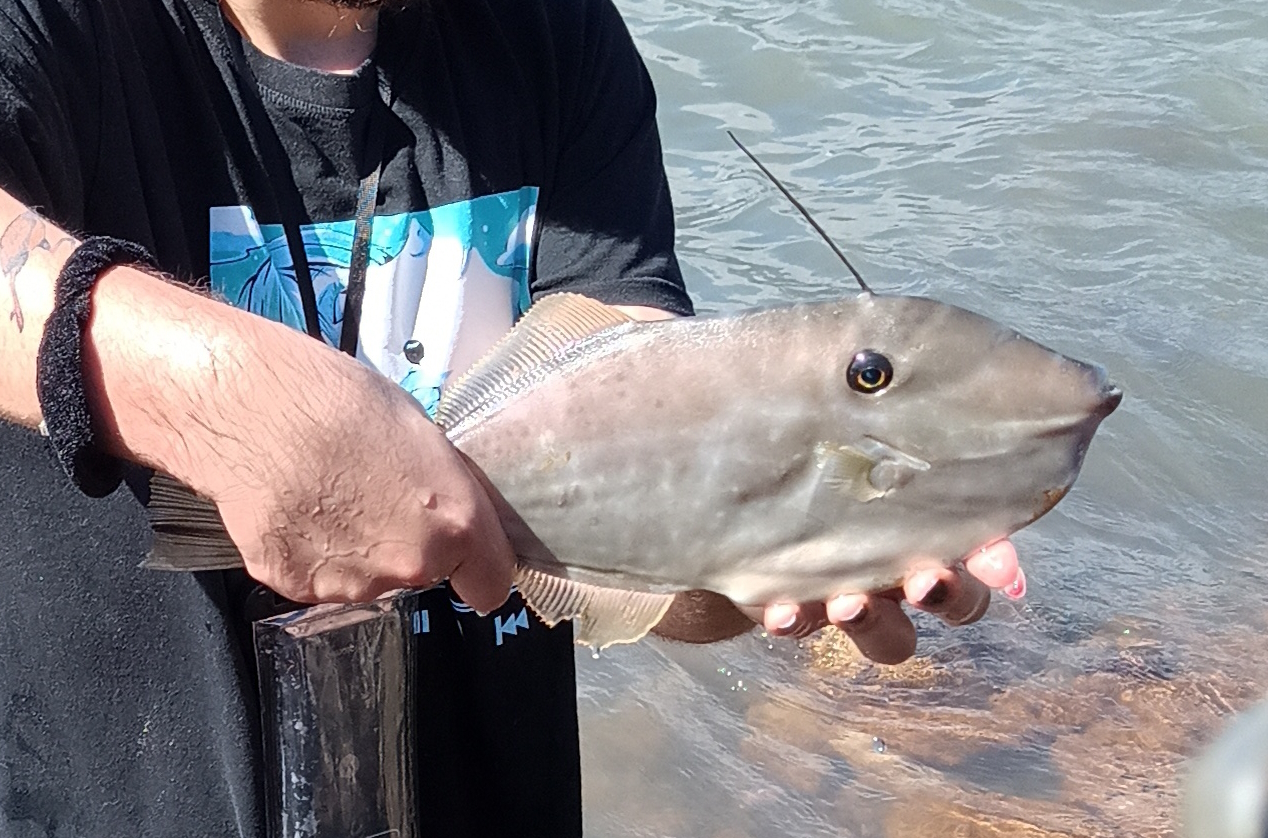
With extended dorsal spine, in Brazil

== Behavior ==
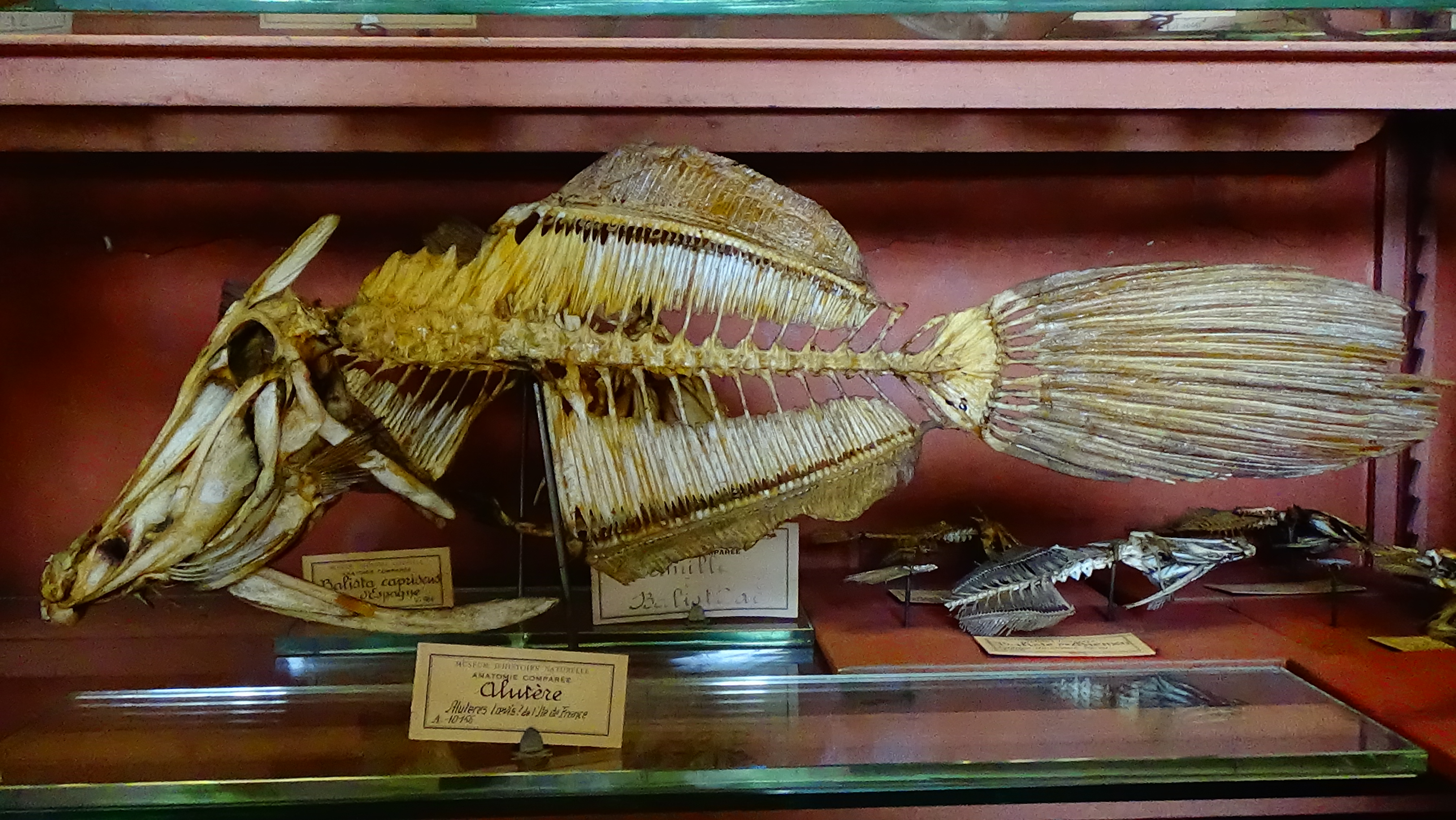
Bones

This species exhibits distinct pairing. Adults may form schools under weed rafts.

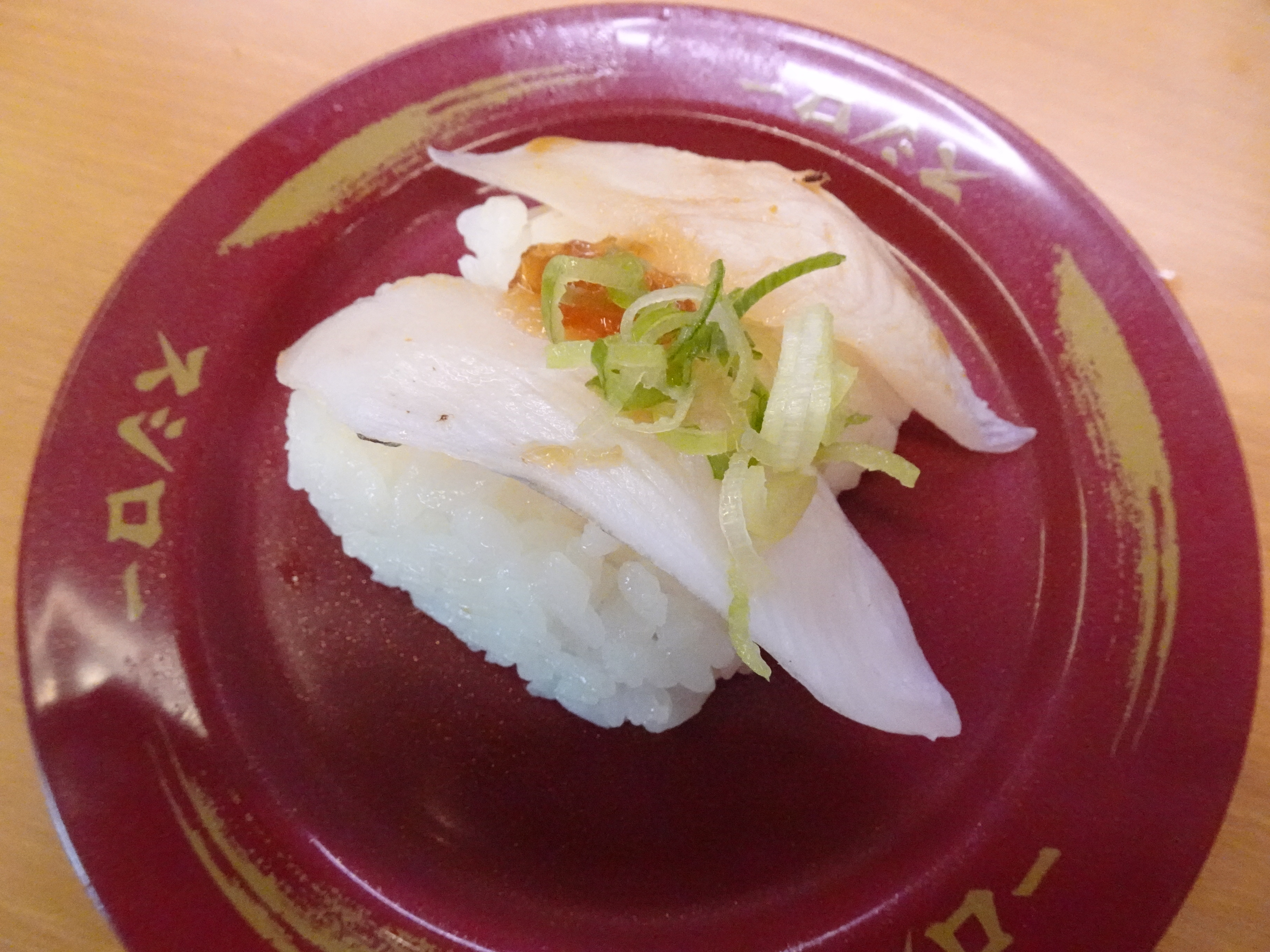
As sushi
