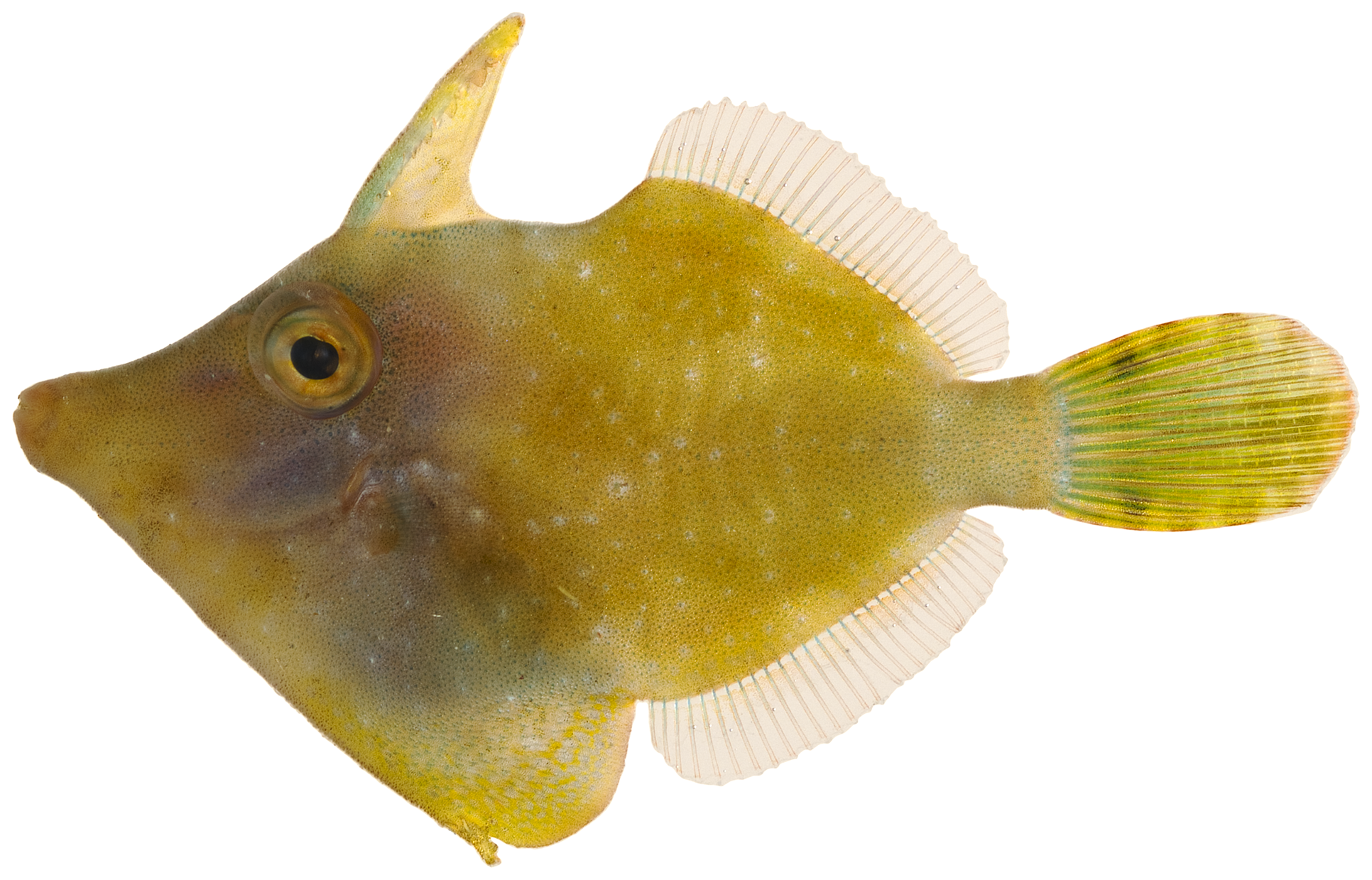

Scientific classification
- Kingdom: Animalia
- Phylum: Chordata
- Class: Actinopterygii
- Order: Tetraodontiformes
- Family: Monacanthidae
- Genus: Monacanthus
- Species: M. ciliatus

Binomial name
- Monacanthus ciliatus (Mitchill, 1818)

Synonyms
- Balistes ciliatus Mitchill, 1818; Monacanthus davidsonii Cope, 1871; Monacanthus occidentalis Günther, 1870; Monacanthus piraaca Kner, 1867

= Monacanthus ciliatus =

Species of fish

Monacanthus ciliatus, commonly known as the fringed filefish, the cuckold or the leather-fish, is a species of bony fish commonly found in shallow water in the western Atlantic Ocean, the Caribbean Sea and the Gulf of Mexico.

== Description ==
The fringed filefish is a laterally flattened fish with a deeply keeled body and a dewlap on the underside. It typically grows to a length of 10 to 14 cm (4 to 6 in), with a maximum length of 20 cm (8 in). The eyes are large, the snout is short and pointed, and the mouth is small, with strong teeth. The dorsal fin is in two parts; the front section is just behind the eyes and consists of two spines, the first one being long and erectile and the second one being tiny; the second part starts further back and consists entirely of soft rays. The pectoral fins are small and the pelvic fin resembles a spine. The caudal fin is short and fan-shaped and consists of branched soft rays. The skin is clad in very small scales, which gives the fish a leathery appearance. The skin is also dotted with scattered small, pointed, fleshy growths. The colour of the fish varies with the surroundings, being greenish in seagrass meadows and brown or tan on reefs or in sandy areas. There are irregular darker longitudinal stripes and there is often a large black spot on the dewlap.

== Distribution and habitat ==
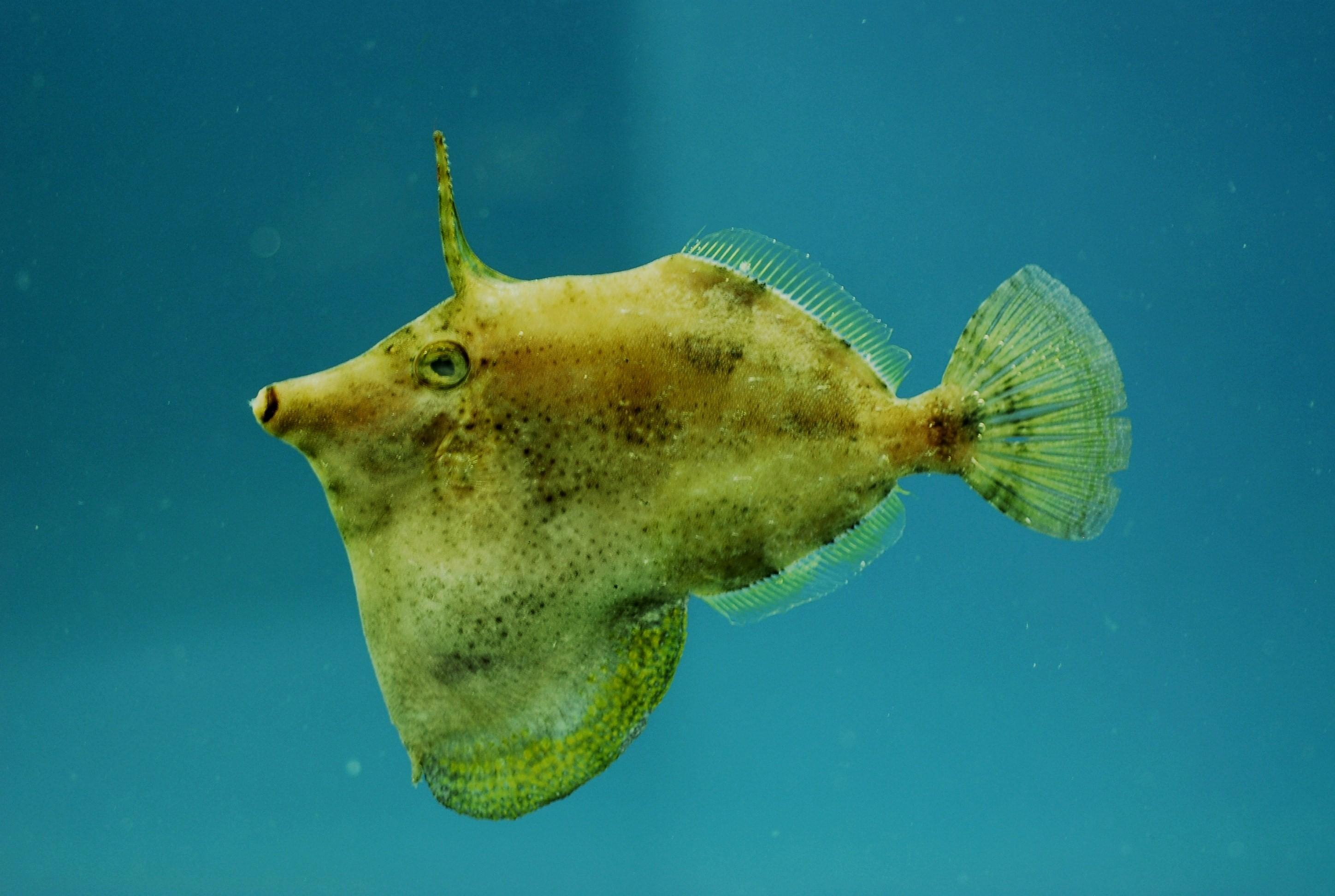
M. ciliatus

The fringed filefish is found in shallow parts of the western Atlantic Ocean between Newfoundland and Argentina, in the Caribbean Sea and the Gulf of Mexico. It is also recorded from the eastern Atlantic coasts of Europe and Africa. It is most commonly found in seagrass meadows, but also frequents coral rubble, sandy areas and sometimes rocky areas. It is a demersal fish and its depth range is 5 to 20 m (16 to 66 ft).

== Biology ==
The fringed filefish can change its colour rapidly to match its surroundings. It often adopts a head-down position among the seagrasses, algae or gorgonians among which it lives. It feeds on algae and seagrass and picks off the seabed small invertebrates, such as shrimps, amphipods, isopods, ostracods, polychaete worms and molluscs.

One male fringed filefish is usually associated with several females, which lay eggs in scoops in the sand or in other concealed places. The eggs are fertilised by the male and then guarded by one of the parents until they hatch. The juvenile fish are pelagic and may be found among floating masses of Sargassum weed.
