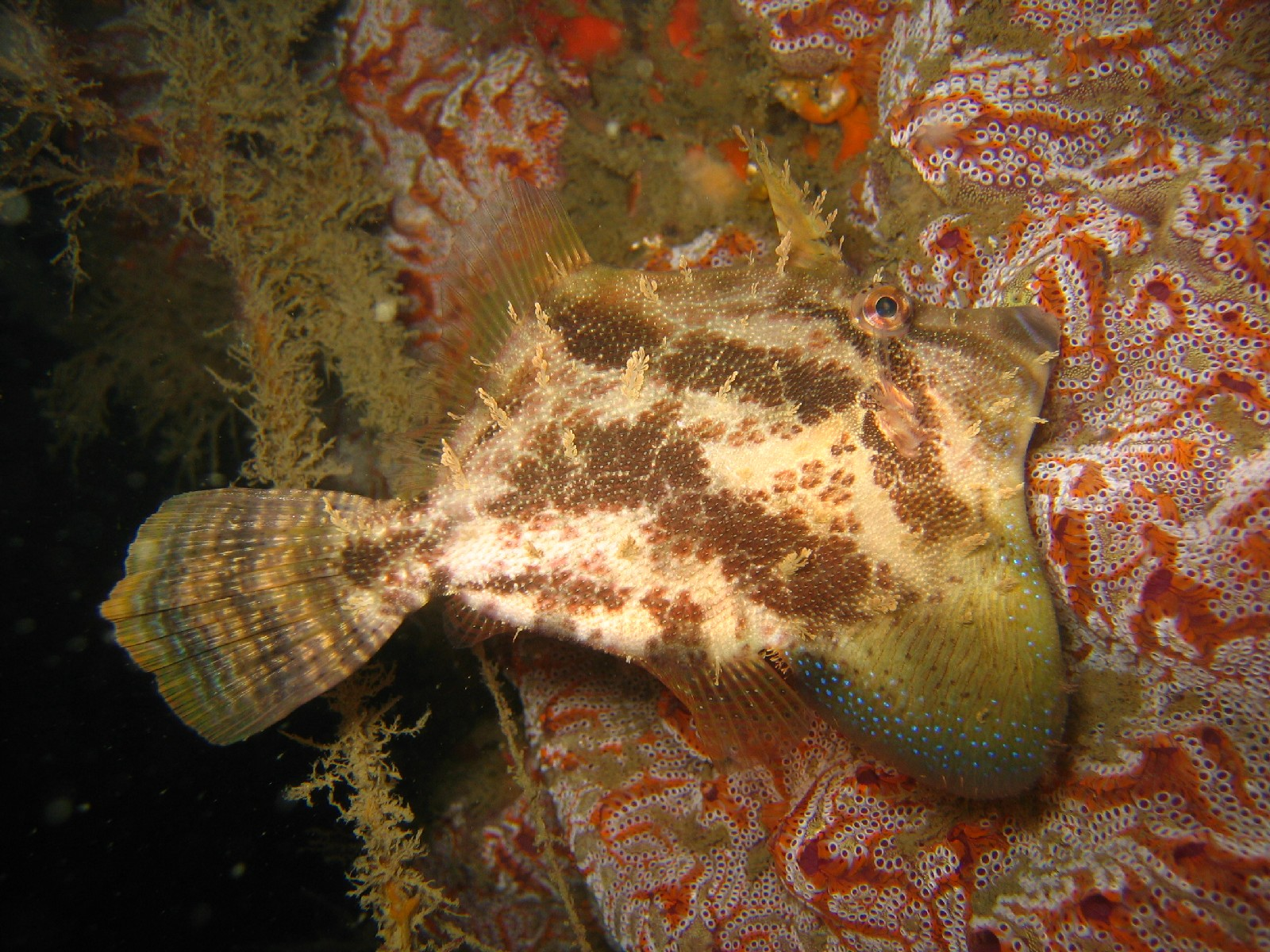
- Monacanthus chinensis

Scientific classification
- Kingdom: Animalia
- Phylum: Chordata
- Class: Actinopterygii
- Order: Tetraodontiformes
- Family: Monacanthidae
- Genus: Monacanthus; Oken, 1817

= Monacanthus =

Genus of fishes

Monacanthus is a genus of filefishes.

== Species ==
These are the currently recognized species in this genus:

Species	Common name	Image
Monacanthus chinensis Osbeck, 1765	Fan-bellied leatherjacket	
Monacanthus ciliatus Mitchill, 1818	Fringed filefish	
Monacanthus tuckeri Bean, 1906	Slender filefish	
