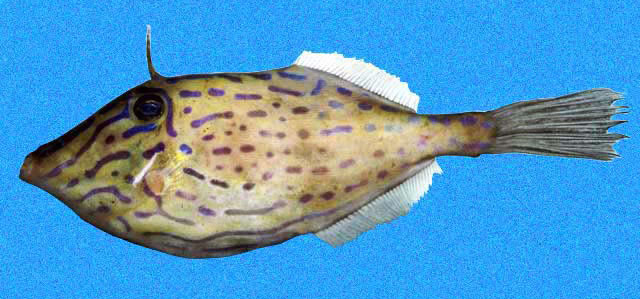

Conservation status
- Least Concern (IUCN 3.1)

Scientific classification
- Kingdom: Animalia
- Phylum: Chordata
- Class: Actinopterygii
- Order: Tetraodontiformes
- Family: Monacanthidae
- Genus: Aluterus
- Species: A. heudelotii

Binomial name
- Aluterus heudelotii Hollard, 1855
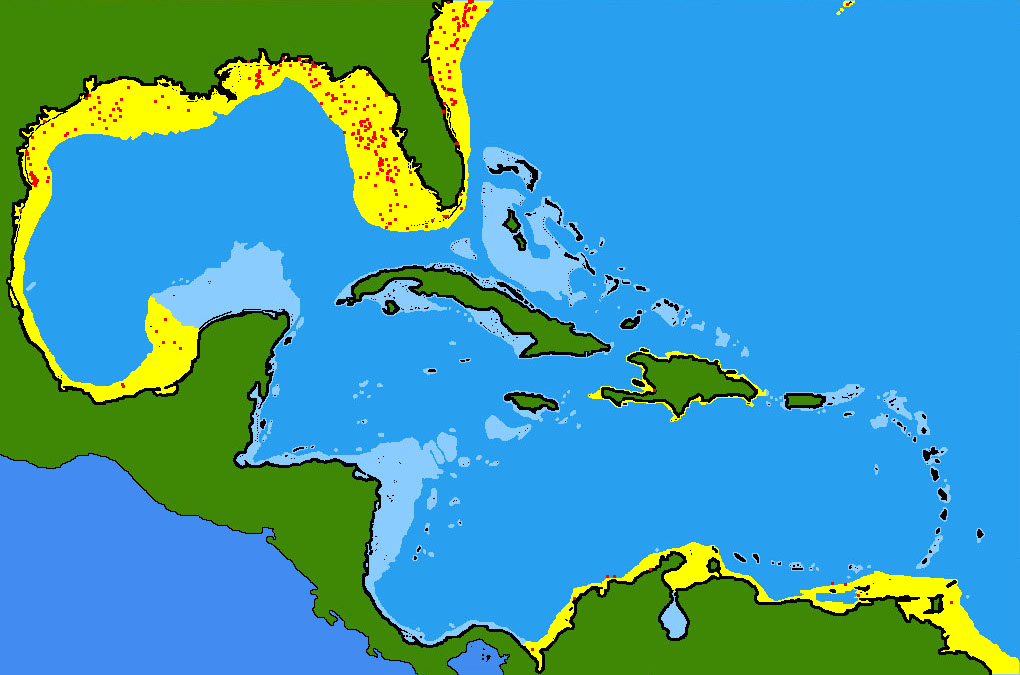

= Aluterus heudelotii =

Species of fish

Aluterus heudelotii, the dotterel filefish or dottered filefish, is a filefish of the family Monacanthidae. It is found in the western Atlantic from Massachusetts to the Gulf of Mexico and along the Caribbean coast of South America to northeast Brazil, and in the eastern Atlantic from Mauritania and Senegal to southern Angola. It is named after Jean-Pierre Heudelot.

This demersal species inhabits seagrass, sand, or mud in shallow waters, typically between 10 and 100 m and occasionally down to 2000 m. It grows up to 45 cm in total length, with a typical length of 25–30 cm, and feeds on plants such as algae and seagrasses. It is of no interest for fisheries.
