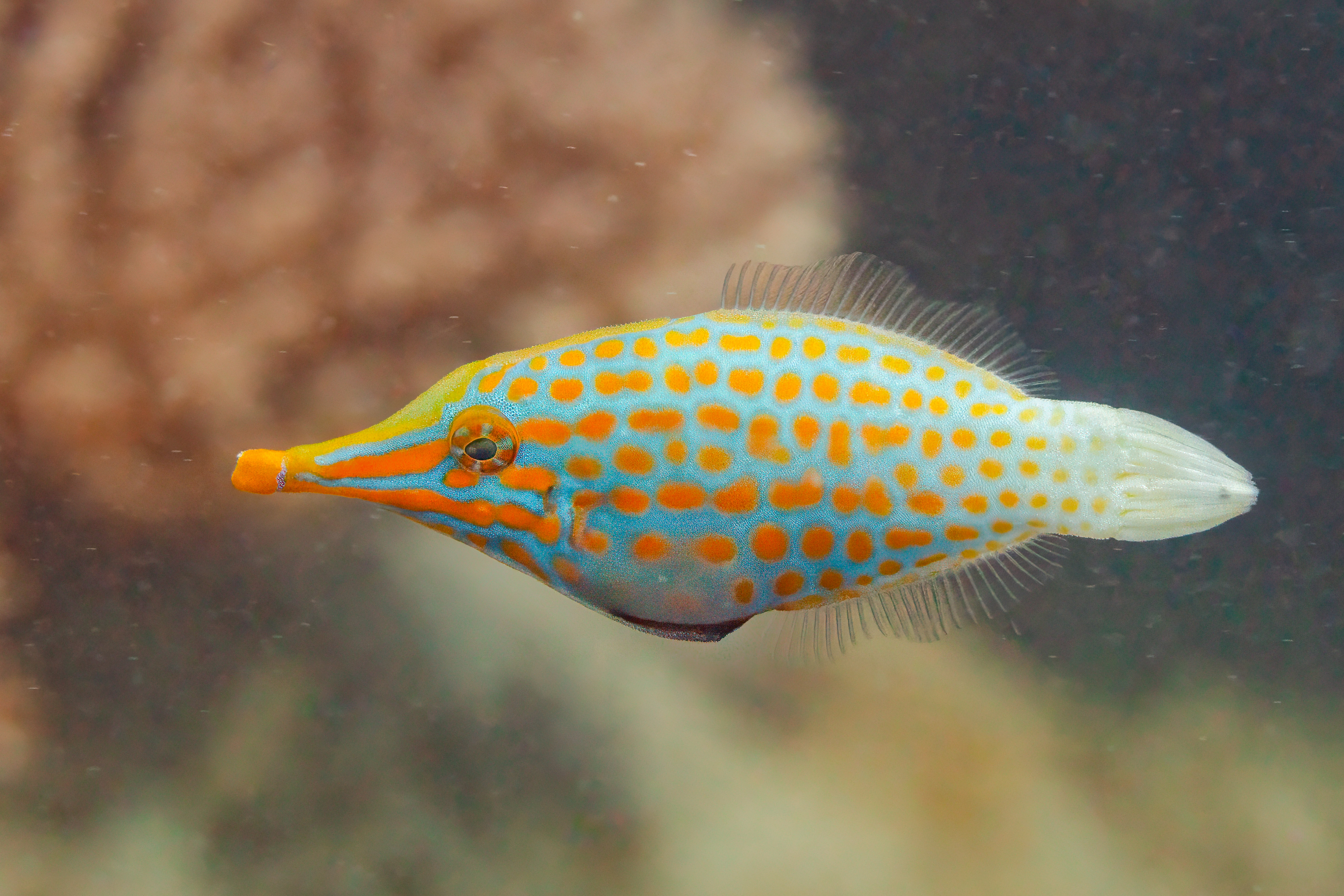
- Oxymonacanthus longirostris

Scientific classification
- Kingdom: Animalia
- Phylum: Chordata
- Class: Actinopterygii
- Order: Tetraodontiformes
- Family: Monacanthidae
- Genus: Oxymonacanthus; Bleeker, 1865

= Oxymonacanthus =

Genus of fishes

Oxymonacanthus is a genus of filefishes native to the Indian and Pacific Oceans.

== Species ==
There are currently 2 recognized species in this genus:

- Oxymonacanthus halli N. B. Marshall, 1952 (Red Sea longnose filefish)
- Oxymonacanthus longirostris Bloch & J. G. Schneider, 1801 (Harlequin filefish)
