= List of fishes of the Houtman Abrolhos =

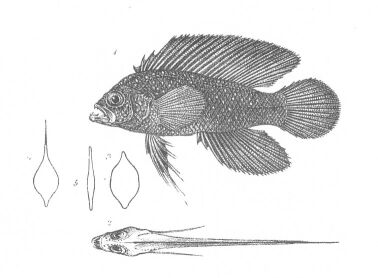
Assiculus punctatus

The marine waters of the Houtman Abrolhos, an island chain off the coast of Western Australia, are unusual in containing a mix of tropical, subtropical and warm-temperate fish species. This mix is largely due to the Leeuwin Current, which brings warm tropical water to the Houtman Abrolhos, especially in winter. Tropical species are the most abundant, eleven of the sixteen most abundant species being tropical fishes. However, there are also a large number of tropical species with populations so small that they are thought not to maintain populations be breeding at the Houtman Abrolhos.

| Common name | Scientific name | Family |
|---|---|---|
| Bluespotted stingray | Amphotistius kuhlii | Dasyatidae |
| Short-tail stingray | Dasyatis brevicaudata | Dasyatidae |
| Striped stingaree | Trygonoptera ovalis | Urolophidae |
| Circular stingaree | Urolophus circularis | Urolophidae |
| Spotted eagle ray | Aetobatus narinari | Myliobatidae |
| Manta ray | Manta birostris | Mobulidae |
| Australian blackspotted catshark | Aulohalaelurus labiosus | Scyliorhinidae |
| Whiskery shark | Furgaleus macki | Triakidae |
| Gummy shark | Mustelus antarcticus | Triakidae |
| Dusky shark | Carcharhinus obscurus | Carcharhinidae |
| Sandbar shark | Carcharhinus plumbeus | Carcharhinidae |
| | Galeocerdo cuvieri | Carcharhinidae |
| Whale shark | Rhincodon typus | Rhincodontidae |
| Ornate wobbegong | Orectolobus ornatus | Orectolobidae |
| | Orectolobus sp. | Orectolobidae |
| Port Jackson shark | Heterodontus portusjacksoni | Heterodontidae |
| | Myrichthys columbrinus | Ophichthidae |
| Abbott's moray eel | Gymnothorax eurostus | Muraenidae |
| Yellow moray | Gymnothorax prasinus | Muraenidae |
| Undulated moray | Gymnothorax undulatus | Muraenidae |
| | Gymnothorax woodwardi | Muraenidae |
| | Etrumeus teres | Clupeidae |
| | Sardinella lemuru | Clupeidae |
| | Sardinops neopilchardus | Clupeidae |
| Slender sprat | Spratelloides gracilis | Clupeidae |
| Blue sprat | Spratelloides robustus | Clupeidae |
| | Gonorhynchus greyi | Gonorhynchidae |
| | Arius thalassinus | Ariidae |
| | Paraplotosus albilabris | Plotosidae |
| | Plotosus lineatus | Plotosidae |
| | Aulopus purpurissatus | Aulopidae |
| Variegated lizardfish | Synodus variegatus | Synodontidae |
| | Saurida undosquamis | Harpadontidae |
| | Batrachomoeus rubricephalus | Batrachoididae |
| | Halophryne ocellatus | Batrachoididae |
| | Antennarius commersoni | Antennariidae |
| Spotfin frogfish | Antennarius nummifer | Antennariidae |
| Striated frogfish | Antennarius striatus | Antennariidae |
| Sargassum fish | Histrio histrio | Antennariidae |
| | Tathicarpus butleri | Antennariidae |
| | Lotella fuliginosa | Moridae |
| | Dipulus caecus | Bythitidae |
| | Ogilbia sp. | Bythitidae |
| | Cypselurus sp. | Exocoetidae |
| | Ablennes hians | Belonidae |
| | Hemiramphus robustus | Hemiramphidae |
| | Hyporhamphus melanochir | Hemiramphidae |
| | Atherinomorus ogilbyi | Atherinidae |
| | Craterocephalus capreoli | Atherinidae |
| | Craterocephalus pauciradiatus | Atherinidae |
| | Hypoatherina temminckii | Atherinidae |
| | Leptatherina presbyteroides | Atherinidae |
| | Cleidopus gloriamaris | Monocentrididae |
| Little pineapple fish | Sorosichthys ananassa | Trachichthyidae |
| | Velifer multiradiatus | Veliferidae |
| | Halicampus brocki | Syngnathidae |
| Narrow-bellied seahorse | Hippocampus angustus | Syngnathidae |
| | Lissocampus fatiloquus | Syngnathidae |
| | Nannocampus subosseus | Syngnathidae |
| | Pugnaso curtirostris | Syngnathidae |
| Günther's pipehorse | Solegnathus lettiensis | Syngnathidae |
| | Pegasus volitans | Pegasidae |
| | Ablabys taenianotus | Scorpaenidae |
| | Centropogon latifrons | Scorpaenidae |
| | Cocotropus sp. | Scorpaenidae |
| | Dentrochirus brachypterus | Scorpaenidae |
| | Maxillicosta lopholepis | Scorpaenidae |
| | Neosebastes bougainvilli | Scorpaenidae |
| | Neosebastes pandus | Scorpaenidae |
| | Parapterios heterurus | Scorpaenidae |
| | Pterios volitans | Scorpaenidae |
| | Scorpaena sumptuosa | Scorpaenidae |
| | Scorpaenodes guamensis | Scorpaenidae |
| | Scorpaenodes scaber | Scorpaenidae |
| | Scorpaenodes steenei | Scorpaenidae |
| | Scorpaenopsis venosa | Scorpaenidae |
| | Inimicus sinensis | Synanceiidae |
| | Lepidotrigla spinosa | Triglidae |
| | Neopataecus waterhousi | Pataecidae |
| | Pataecus fronto | Pataecidae |
| | Leviprora inops | Platycephalidae |
| | Onigocia oligolepis | Platycephalidae |
| | Platycephalus endrachtensis | Platycephalidae |
| | Platycephalus longispinis | Platycephalidae |
| | Hypopterus macropterus | Centropomidae |
| | Acanthistius pardalotus | Serranidae |
| | Acanthistius serratus | Serranidae |
| | Cephalopholis argus | Serranidae |
| | Cephalopholis miniata | Serranidae |
| Black-arse cod | Epinephelides armatus | Serranidae |
| | Epinephelus bilobatus | Serranidae |
| Estuary cod | Epinephelus coioides | Serranidae |
| Blacktip grouper | Epinephelus fasciatus | Serranidae |
| Giant grouper | Epinephelus lanceolatus | Serranidae |
| | Epinephelus multinotatus | Serranidae |
| | Epinephelus rivulatus | Serranidae |
| | Hypoplectrodes cardinalis | Serranidae |
| Coral trout | Plectropomus leopardus | Serranidae |
| | Plectropomus maculatus | Serranidae |
| | Pseudanthias cooperi | Serranidae |
| Yellow-edged lyretail | Variola louti | Serranidae |
| | Unidentified grammistid | Grammistidae |
| | Assiculus punctatus | Pseudochromidae |
| | Labracinus lineatus | Pseudochromidae |
| | Pseudochromis wilsoni | Pseudochromidae |
| | Paraplesiops meleagris | Plesiopidae |
| | Trachinops brauni | Plesiopidae |
| | Trachinops noarlungae | Plesiopidae |
| | Belonepterygion fasciolatum | Acanthoclinidae |
| | Glaucosoma hebraicum | Glaucosomatidae |
| | Banjos banjos | Banjosidae |
| | Heteropriacanthus cruentatus | Priacanthidae |
| | Priacanthus hamrur | Priacanthidae |
| Ring-tailed cardinalfish | Apogon aureus | Apogonidae |
| | Apogon cavitiensis | Apogonidae |
| | Apogon coccineus | Apogonidae |
| | Apogon doederleini | Apogonidae |
| | Apogon rueppellii | Apogonidae |
| | Apogon semiornatus | Apogonidae |
| | Apogon victoriae | Apogonidae |
| | Cercamia eremia | Apogonidae |
| | Cheilodipterus quinquelineatus | Apogonidae |
| | Fowleria aurita | Apogonidae |
| | Fowleria variegata | Apogonidae |
| | Siphamia cephalotes | Apogonidae |
| | Vincentia badia | Apogonidae |
| Golden lined whiting | Sillago analis | Sillaginidae |
| Bluefish | Pomatomus saltatrix | Pomatomidae |
| | Carangoides equula | Carangidae |
| | Decapterus muroadsi | Carangidae |
| White trevally | Pseudocaranx dentex | Carangidae |
| | Pseudocaranx wrighti | Carangidae |
| | Seriola dumerili | Carangidae |
| Samson fish | Seriola hippos | Carangidae |
| Yellowtail amberjack | Seriola lalandi | Carangidae |
| | Trachurus novazelandiae | Carangidae |
| Mahi-mahi | Coryphaena hippurus | Coryphaenidae |
| | Rachycentron canadus | Rachycentridae |
| Australian herring | Arripis georgianus | Arripidae |
| | Lutjanus fulviflamma | Lutjanidae |
| | Lutjanus quinquelineatus | Lutjanidae |
| | Lutjanus russelli | Lutjanidae |
| | Paracaesio xanthurus | Lutjanidae |
| | Pentapodus porosus | Nemipteridae |
| | Pentapodus emeryii | Nemipteridae |
| | Pentapodus vitta | Nemipteridae |
| | Scolopsis bilineatus | Nemipteridae |
| | Parequula melbournensis | Gerreidae |
| | Diagramma pictum | Haemulidae |
| | Plectorhinchus flavomaculatus | Haemulidae |
| | Plectorhinchus schotaf | Haemulidae |
| | Lethrinus atkinsoni | Lethrinidae |
| | Lethrinus genivittatus | Lethrinidae |
| | Lethrinus miniatus | Lethrinidae |
| | Lethrinus nebulosus | Lethrinidae |
| Southern black bream | Acanthopagrus butcheri | Sparidae |
| Australasian snapper | Pagrus auratus | Sparidae |
| Tarwhine | Rhabdosargus sarba | Sparidae |
| | Parupeneus barberinoides | Mullidae |
| | Parapeneus chrysopleurum | Mullidae |
| | Parapeneus pleurostigma | Mullidae |
| | Parapeneus spilurus | Mullidae |
| | Upeneichthys lineatus vlamingii | Mullidae |
| | Upeneichthys stotti | Mullidae |
| | Schuettea woodwardi | Monodactylidae |
| | Parapriacanthus elongatus | Pempherididae |
| | Parapriacanthus ransonneti | Pempherididae |
| | Pempheris analis | Pempherididae |
| | Pempheris klunzingeri | Pempherididae |
| | Pempheris schwenkii | Pempherididae |
| | Pempheris sp. | Pempherididae |
| | Girella tephraeops | Girellidae |
| | Kyphosus cornelii | Kyphosidae |
| Silver drummer | Kyphosus sydneyanus | Kyphosidae |
| | Microcanthus strigatus | Scorpididae |
| | Neatypus obliquus | Scorpididae |
| | Scorpis georgianus | Scorpididae |
| | Platax teira | Ephippididae |
| | Chaetodon assarius | Chaetodontidae |
| | Chaetodon aureofasciatus | Chaetodontidae |
| Threadfin butterflyfish | Chaetodon auriga | Chaetodontidae |
| Speckled butterflyfish | Chaetodon citrinellus | Chaetodontidae |
| Sunburst butterflyfish | Chaetodon kleinii | Chaetodontidae |
| Lined butterflyfish | Chaetodon lineolatus | Chaetodontidae |
| Raccoon butterflyfish | Chaetodon lunula | Chaetodontidae |
| | Chaetodon plebeius | Chaetodontidae |
| | Chaetodon speculum | Chaetodontidae |
| Chevron butterflyfish | Chaetodon trifascialis | Chaetodontidae |
| Melon butterflyfish | Chaetodon trifasciatus | Chaetodontidae |
| | Chelmon marginalis | Chaetodontidae |
| | Chelmonops curiosus | Chaetodontidae |
| Pennant coralfish | Heniochus acuminatus | Chaetodontidae |
| | Parachaetodon ocellatus | Chaetodontidae |
| | Centropyge tibicen | Pomacanthidae |
| | Chaetodontoplus personifer | Pomacanthidae |
| | Pomacanthus semicirculatus | Pomacanthidae |
| Oldwife | Enoplosus armatus | Enoplosidae |
| | Abudefduf bengalensis | Pomacentridae |
| Scissortail sergeant | Abudefduf sexfasciatus | Pomacentridae |
| | Abudefduf sordidus | Pomacentridae |
| Indo-Pacific sergeant | Abudefduf vaigiensis | Pomacentridae |
| Clark's anemonefish | Amphiprion clarkii | Pomacentridae |
| Black-axil chromis | Chromis atripectoralis | Pomacentridae |
| | Chromis klunzingeri | Pomacentridae |
| | Chromis margaritifer | Pomacentridae |
| Green Chromis | Chromis viridis | Pomacentridae |
| | Chromis westaustralis | Pomacentridae |
| Whitetail dascyllus | Dascyllus aruanus | Pomacentridae |
| | Dascyllus reticulatus | Pomacentridae |
| Threespot dascyllus | Dascyllus trimaculatus | Pomacentridae |
| | Parma mccullochi | Pomacentridae |
| | Parma occidentalis | Pomacentridae |
| | Plectroglyphidodon dickii | Pomacentridae |
| | Plectroglyphidodon johnstonianus | Pomacentridae |
| | Plectroglyphidodon lacrymatus | Pomacentridae |
| | Plectroglyphidodon leucozonus | Pomacentridae |
| | Pomacentrus coelestis | Pomacentridae |
| | Pomacentrus milleri | Pomacentridae |
| | Pristotis jerdoni | Pomacentridae |
| | Stegastes fasciolatus | Pomacentridae |
| | Stegastes nigricans | Pomacentridae |
| | Stegastes obreptus | Pomacentridae |
| Spotted hawkfish | Cirrhitichthys aprinus | Cirrhitidae |
| | Paracirrhites forsteri | Cirrhitidae |
| | Cheilodactylus gibbosus | Cheilodactylidae |
| | Cheilodactylus rubrolabiatus | Cheilodactylidae |
| | Dactylophora nigricans | Cheilodactylidae |
| Yellow-eye mullet | Aldrichetta forsteri | Mugilidae |
| Flathead mullet | Mugil cephalus | Mugilidae |
| Obtuse barracuda | Sphyraena obtusata | Sphyraenidae |
| | Achoerodus gouldii | Labridae |
| | Anampses caeruleopunctatus | Labridae |
| | Anampses geographicus | Labridae |
| | Austrolabrus maculatus | Labridae |
| | Bodianus axillaris | Labridae |
| | Bodianus bilunulatus | Labridae |
| Foxfish | Bodianus frenchii | Labridae |
| | Bodianus perditio | Labridae |
| | Cheilinus chlorurus | Labridae |
| Redbreast wrasse | Cheilinus fasciatus | Labridae |
| | Cheilinus trilobatus | Labridae |
| | Cheilio inermis | Labridae |
| Bluespotted tuskfish | Choerodon cauteroma | Labridae |
| Blue tuskfish | Choerodon cyanodus | Labridae |
| | Choerodon jordani | Labridae |
| Baldchin groper | Choerodon rubescens | Labridae |
| Blackspot tuskfish | Choerodon schoenleinii | Labridae |
| | Cirrhilabrus temmincki | Labridae |
| | Coris auricularis | Labridae |
| Clown coris | Coris aygula | Labridae |
| | Coris caudimacula | Labridae |
| | Dotalabrus alleni | Labridae |
| | Epibulus insidiator | Labridae |
| | Eupetrichthys angustipes | Labridae |
| | Gomphosus varius | Labridae |
| | Halichoeres brownfieldi | Labridae |
| | Halichoeres nebulosus | Labridae |
| | Halichoeres trimaculatus | Labridae |
| | Hemigymnus fasciatus | Labridae |
| | Hemigymnus melapterus | Labridae |
| | Hologymnosus annulatus | Labridae |
| | Labrichthys unilineatus | Labridae |
| | Labroides bicolor | Labridae |
| Bluestreak cleaner wrasse | Labroides dimidiatus | Labridae |
| | Macropharyngodon ornatus | Labridae |
| | Notolabrus parilus | Labridae |
| | Ophthalmolepis lineolatus | Labridae |
| | Pictilabrus laticlavius | Labridae |
| Long green wrasse | Pseudojuloides elongatus | Labridae |
| | Pseudolabrus beserialis | Labridae |
| | Pteragogus flagelligera | Labridae |
| | Stethojulis bandanensis | Labridae |
| | Stethojulis interrupta | Labridae |
| | Stethojulis strigiventer | Labridae |
| | Suezichthys cyanolaemus | Labridae |
| | Thalassoma amblycephalum | Labridae |
| | Thalassoma hardwicke | Labridae |
| Moon wrasse | Thalassoma lunare | Labridae |
| | Thalassoma lutescens | Labridae |
| | Thalassoma purpureum | Labridae |
| | Thalassoma septemfasciata | Labridae |
| | Thalassoma trilobatum | Labridae |
| | Heteroscarus acroptilus | Odacidae |
| Marbled parrotfish | Leptoscarus vaigiensis | Scaridae |
| | Scarus chameleon | Scaridae |
| | Scarus frenatus | Scaridae |
| | Scarus ghobban | Scaridae |
| | Scarus gibbus | Scaridae |
| | Scarus rivulatus | Scaridae |
| | Scarus schlegeli | Scaridae |
| | Scarus sordidus | Scaridae |
| | Opistognathus inornata | Opistognathidae |
| | Opistognathus sp. | Opistognathidae |
| | Parapercis haackei | Pinguipedidae |
| | Parapercis nebulosa | Pinguipedidae |
| | Limnichthys fasciatus | Creediidae |
| | Atrosalarias fuscus holomelas | Blenniidae |
| | Cirripectes filamentosus | Blenniidae |
| | Cirripectes hutchinsi | Blenniidae |
| | Entomacrodus striatus | Blenniidae |
| | Istiblennius chrysospilos | Blenniidae |
| | Istiblennius meleagris | Blenniidae |
| | Meiacanthus grammistes | Blenniidae |
| | Omobranchus germaini | Blenniidae |
| | Parablennius postoculomaculatus | Blenniidae |
| | Petroscirtes breviceps | Blenniidae |
| | Petroscirtes mitratus | Blenniidae |
| | Plagiotremus rhinorhynchos | Blenniidae |
| Mimic blenny | Plagiotremus tapeinosoma | Blenniidae |
| | Enneapterygius larsonae | Tripterygiidae |
| | Helcogramma decurrens | Tripterygiidae |
| | Norfolkia brachylepis | Tripterygiidae |
| | Norfolkia leeuwin | Tripterygiidae |
| Golden weedfish | Cristiceps aurantiacus | Clinidae |
| Crested weedfish | Cristiceps australis | Clinidae |
| | Heteroclinus sp. | Clinidae |
| | Ophiclinus gracilis | Clinidae |
| | Callionymus enneactes | Callionymidae |
| | Callionymus goodladi | Callionymidae |
| | Callionymus grossi | Callionymidae |
| | Diplogammus xenicus | Callionymidae |
| | Synchiropus papilio | Callionymidae |
| | Synchiropus rameus | Callionymidae |
| | Alabes parvulus | Gobiesocidae |
| | Lepadichthys frenatus | Gobiesocidae |
| | Amblygobius phalaena | Gobiidae |
| | Asterropteryx semipunctatus | Gobiidae |
| | Bathygobius cocosensis | Gobiidae |
| | Bathygobius fuscus | Gobiidae |
| | Callogobius mucosis | Gobiidae |
| | Callogobius sp. | Gobiidae |
| | Callogobius sp. | Gobiidae |
| | Eviota bimaculata | Gobiidae |
| | Eviota infulata | Gobiidae |
| | Eviota melasma | Gobiidae |
| | Eviota queenslandica | Gobiidae |
| | Eviota storthynx | Gobiidae |
| | Eviota sp. | Gobiidae |
| | Exyrias belissimus | Gobiidae |
| | Fusigobius duospilus | Gobiidae |
| | Gnatholepis scapulostigma | Gobiidae |
| | Gobiodon citrinus | Gobiidae |
| | Pleurosicya fringilla | Gobiidae |
| | Priolepis cincta | Gobiidae |
| | Priolepis nuchifasciatus | Gobiidae |
| | Valenciennea puellaris | Gobiidae |
| | Vanderhorstia ornatissima | Gobiidae |
| Curious wormfish | Gunnellichthys curiosus | Microdesmidae |
| | Acanthurus grammoptilus | Acanthuridae |
| Manini | Acanthurus triostegus | Acanthuridae |
| | Naso fageni | Acanthuridae |
| | Naso unicornis | Acanthuridae |
| | Zebrasoma scopas | Acanthuridae |
| | Zebrasoma veliferum | Acanthuridae |
| | Siganus fuscescens | Siganidae |
| | Grammatorcynus bicarinatus | Scombridae |
| Maittya | Scomberomorus commerson | Scombridae |
| | Sarda orientalis | Scombridae |
| Yellowfin tuna | Thunnus albacares | Scombridae |
| | Bothus pantherhinus | Bothidae |
| | Crossorhombus valderostratus | Bothidae |
| | Engyprosopon grandisquama | Bothidae |
| | Pseudorhombus quinquocellatus | Bothidae |
| | Zebrias cancellatus | Soleidae |
| | Cynoglossus broadhursti | Cynoglossidae |
| | Anacanthus barbatus | Monacanthidae |
| Scrawled filefish | Aluterus scriptus | Monacanthidae |
| | Cantheschenia longipinnis | Monacanthidae |
| | Chaetodermis penicilligerus | Monacanthidae |
| | Colurodontis paxmani | Monacanthidae |
| | Eubalichthys caeruleoguttatus | Monacanthidae |
| | Meuschenia hippocrepis | Monacanthidae |
| | Monacanthus chinensis | Monacanthidae |
| Orange spotted filefish | Oxymonacanthus longirostris | Monacanthidae |
| | Paramonacanthus choirocephalus | Monacanthidae |
| | Pervagor janthinosoma | Monacanthidae |
| | Scobinichthys granulatus | Monacanthidae |
| | Stephanolepis sp. | Monacanthidae |
| | Anoplocapros lenticularis | Ostraciidae |
| | Anoplocapros robustus | Ostraciidae |
| Yellow boxfish | Ostracion cubicus | Ostraciidae |
| | Tetrosomus concatenatus | Ostraciidae |
| White-spotted puffer | Arothron hispidus | Tetraodontidae |
| | Lagocephalus sceleratus | Tetraodontidae |
| | Torquigener pallimaculatus | Tetraodontidae |
| | Torquigener paxtoni | Tetraodontidae |
| | Torquigener pleurogramma | Tetraodontidae |
| | Torquigener vicinis | Tetraodontidae |
| Slender-spined porcupine fish | Diodon nicthemerus | Diodontidae |
