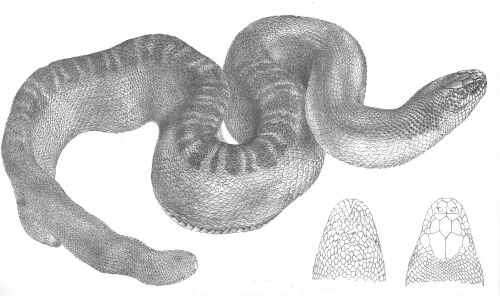
- John Lort Stokes 1846 Discoveries in Australia

Conservation status
- Least Concern (IUCN 3.1)

Scientific classification
- Kingdom: Animalia
- Phylum: Chordata
- Class: Reptilia
- Order: Squamata
- Suborder: Serpentes
- Family: Elapidae
- Genus: Hydrophis
- Species: H. stokesii

Binomial name
- Hydrophis stokesii (Gray, 1846)

Synonyms
- Hydrus stokesii Gray, 1846; Hydrophis stokesii — Günther, 1864; Distira stokesi — Boulenger, 1890; Astrotia stokesii — Wall, 1921; Disteira stokesii — Grandison, 1978

= Stokes's sea snake =

Species of snake

Stokes's sea snake (Hydrophis stokesii) is a large species of sea snake in the family Elapidae. It is sometimes placed in its own genus Astrotia. The species is endemic to tropical Indo-Pacific oceanic waters.

== Etymology ==
Both the specific name, stokesii, and the common name, Stokes' seasnake, are in honor of Royal Navy Admiral John Lort Stokes.

== Description ==
Stokes's sea snake is one of the heaviest and stoutest seasnakes, with the longest fangs of any marine snake. Its fangs are long enough to pierce a wetsuit. Its mid-ventral scales are enlarged to form a distinct keel on its belly, the keel frequently broken up into two wart-like tubercles. A. stokesii is highly variable in colour, ranging from cream to brown to black, often with broad black dorsal cross bands, or black rings.

Rostral as deep as broad; nasals shorter than the frontal, more than twice as long as the suture between the prefrontals; frontal longer than broad, as long as or slightly longer than its distance from the rostral scale; one pre- and two postoculars, 9 or 10 upper labials, fourth, fifth, and sixth catering the eye, if not divided to form a series of suboculars; two or three superposed anterior temporals; no chin-shields. 39 to 47 scales round the neck, 48 to 53 round the middle of the body. Ventral scales usually distinct only quite anteriorly, further back in pairs and not larger than the adjoining scales; scales much imbricate, pointed.

Total length 1.5 metres (5 ft).

== Geographic range ==
It is distributed from India, Pakistan and Sri Lanka to the South China Sea and Strait of Taiwan. It also lives in all waters of tropical Australia.

== Human interactions ==
There are no reported human fatalities attributed to Stokes's sea snake.

Stokes's sea snake is captured as bycatch in fisheries, for example in prawn fisheries in Australia.

== Habits ==
Stokes's sea snakes sometimes form migrating groups in the thousands, drifting in meter-long slicks in the Strait of Malacca. They are ovoviviparous, producing small broods of five young each mating season.

== Taxonomy ==
It was first described and named as Hydrus stokesii by John Edward Gray in Appendix 3 to Volume 1 of John Lort Stokes' 1846 Discoveries in Australia. In 1972, McDowell resurrected the genus Disteira and merged Astrotia into it, although stokesii lacks the Oxyuranus pattern of venom gland muscle which typifies Disteira, and differs from others in that genus by number of body vertebrae and heart position. Cogger later refused to recognize the placement of stokesii into Disteira.
