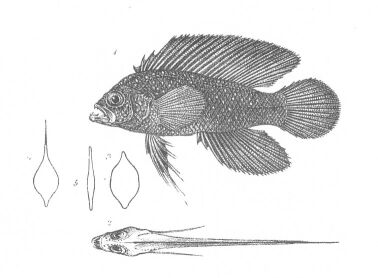
- Assiculus punctatus from John Lort Stokes' 1846 Discoveries in Australia

Scientific classification
- Kingdom: Animalia
- Phylum: Chordata
- Class: Actinopterygii
- Order: Blenniiformes
- Family: Pseudochromidae
- Subfamily: Pseudochrominae
- Genus: Assiculus; Richardson, 1846
- Species: A. punctatus

Binomial name
- Assiculus punctatus Richardson, 1846

= Assiculus =

Genus of fishes

Assiculus is a genus of fish in the Dottyback family Pseudochromidae. It is monotypic, containing only Assiculus punctatus. It is a small species of Dottyback which is covered in small, bright blue spots. The males are bluish in color while the females are greenish-yellow and are smaller than the males. A. punctatus is found in coastal areas in the vicinity of reefs and weedy areas; normally in rather turbid waters as deep as 30 metres (98 ft). This species is secretive and frequents areas where there are highly eroded limestone reefs and rocks.

The genus and species were first published by Sir John Richardson in an appendix to Volume 1 of John Lort Stokes' 1846 Discoveries in Australia. The specific name punctatus references the small blue spots on the dorsal part of the body and fins.
