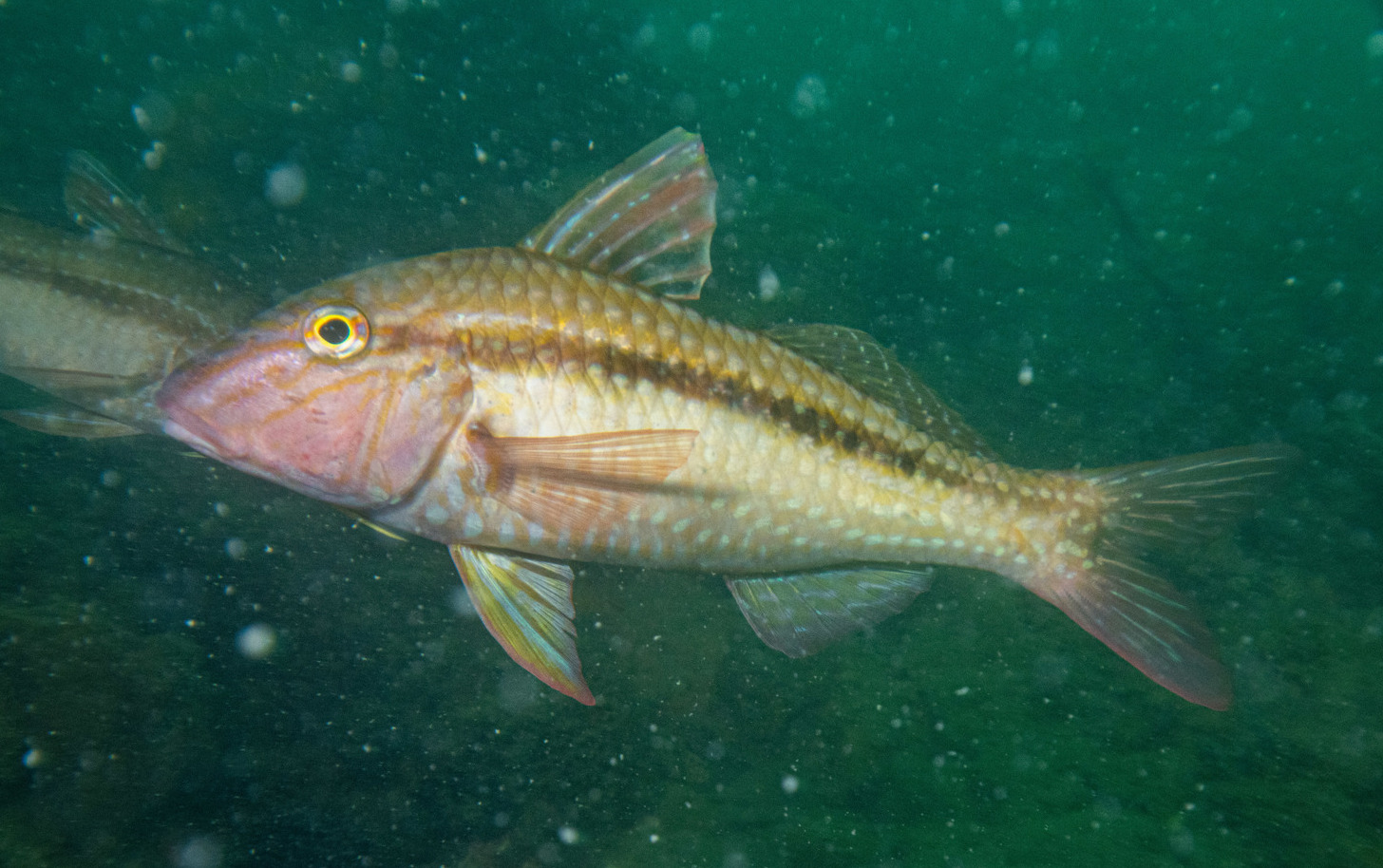
- U. porosus

Scientific classification
- Kingdom: Animalia
- Phylum: Chordata
- Class: Actinopterygii
- Order: Syngnathiformes
- Family: Mullidae
- Genus: Upeneichthys; Bleeker, 1853 (Note: Also in Bleeker, P. (1855). "Over eenige visschen van van Diemensland". Verhandelingen der Koninklijke Akademie van Wetenschappen. 2. Amsterdam: 1–30 + 31, 1 pl.)

Type species
- Upeneus porosus Cuvier, 1829

Synonyms
- Atahua Phillipps, 1941

= Upeneichthys =

Genus of ray-finned fishes

Upeneichthys is a genus of goatfishes native to the Indian and Pacific coasts of Australia.

== Species ==
There are currently four recognized species in this genus:

Species	Common name	Image
Upeneichthys lineatus Bloch & Schneider, 1801	Blue-lined goatfish	
Upeneichthys porosus (Cuvier 1829)		
Upeneichthys stotti Hutchins, 1990	Stott's goatfish	
Upeneichthys vlamingii (Cuvier, 1829)	Southern goatfish	

Nota bene: Kim (2002) and the Catalog of Fishes currently treat U. porosus as its own species, while FishBase currently treats it as a synonym of U. lineatus.
