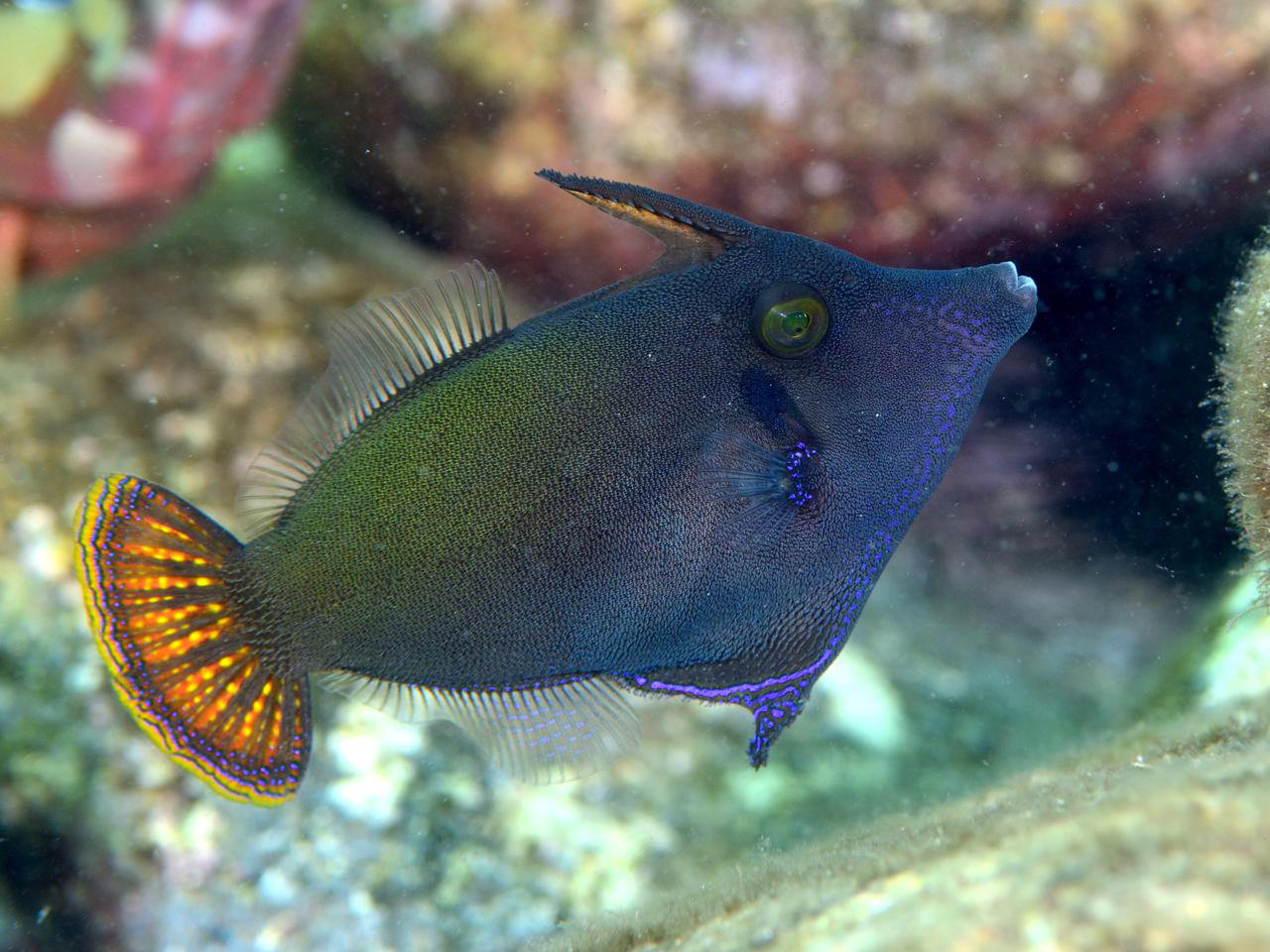
- Pervagor janthinosoma

Scientific classification
- Kingdom: Animalia
- Phylum: Chordata
- Class: Actinopterygii
- Order: Tetraodontiformes
- Family: Monacanthidae
- Genus: Pervagor; Whitley, 1930

= Pervagor =

Genus of fishes

Pervagor is a genus of filefishes native to the Indian and Pacific Oceans.

== Species ==
There are currently 8 recognized species in this genus:

Species	Common name	Image
Pervagor alternans (J. D. Ogilby, 1899)	Yelloweye filefish	
Pervagor aspricaudus (Hollard, 1854)	Orangetail filefish	
Pervagor janthinosoma (Bleeker, 1854)	Blackbar filefish	
Pervagor marginalis Hutchins, 1986		
Pervagor melanocephalus (Bleeker, 1853)	Redtail filefish	
Pervagor nigrolineatus (Herre, 1927)	Black-lined filefish	
Pervagor randalli Hutchins, 1986		
Pervagor spilosoma (Lay & E. T. Bennett, 1839)	Fantail filefish	
