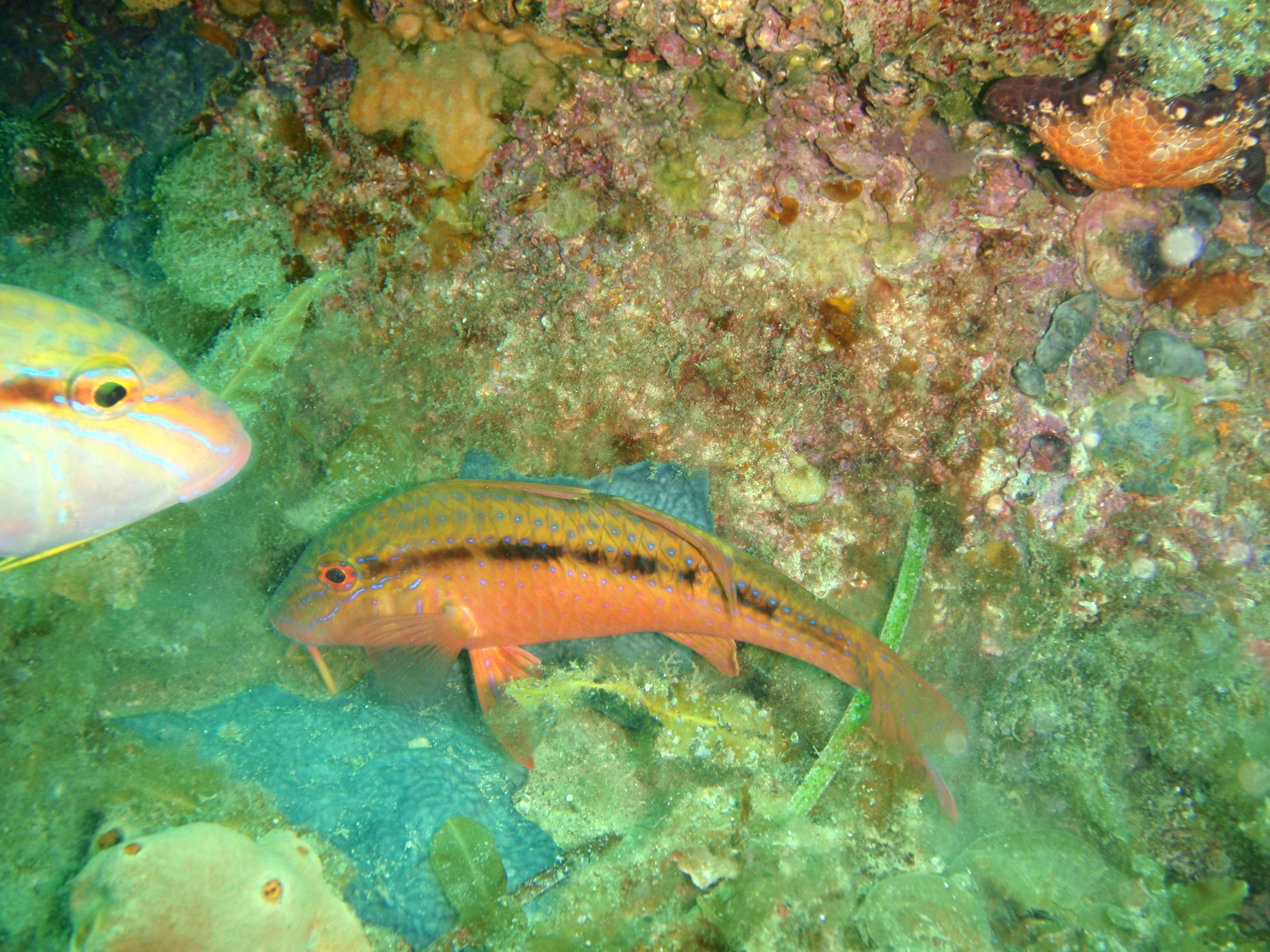

Scientific classification
- Kingdom: Animalia
- Phylum: Chordata
- Class: Actinopterygii
- Order: Syngnathiformes
- Family: Mullidae
- Genus: Upeneichthys
- Species: U. vlamingii

Binomial name
- Upeneichthys vlamingii (G. Cuvier, 1829)

Synonyms
- Upeneus vlamingii G. Cuvier, 1829

= Upeneichthys vlamingii =

Species of fish

Upeneichthys vlamingii, the blue-spotted goatfish, southern goatfish, black-striped goatfish, blue-striped red mullet, southern red mullet or western red mullet, is a species of marine ray-finned fish, a goatfish from the family Mullidae native to the coast of southern Australia.

== Description ==
Upeneichthys vlamingii has a moderately long and compressed body with a rounded dorsal profile which is steep in front of first dorsal fin. It has a long snout and is small eyed with a small mouth which has fleshy lips which do not reach the front of the eye. It has two dorsal fins. The first is spiny and is taller and shorter base than the second which contains soft-rays. The barbels on its chin are roughly the same length as its head. The colour of this species is very variable with a background colour which may be greyish-cream, pale greenish, pinkish to orange-red. Many specimens show a reddish or black stripe along the flanks from the snout to the caudal peduncle. The adults have the scales on their bodies marked with blue spots. During the night and when stimulated, they often darken their body to a reddish colour. The first dorsal fin has 9 spines while the second dorsal fin has 8 rays, the anal fin has 1-2 spinesd and 8 rays. This species may be difficult to distinguish from the blue-striped goatfish (Upeneus lineatus) but this species has a marginally longer head a dark flank stripe.

== Distribution ==
Upeneichthys vlamingii is widespread along the costs off southern Australia, where it can be very common. Its range extends from southern Western Australia east along the southern Australian coast to Tasmania and north along the east coast as far as southern New South Wales.

== Habitat and biology ==
Upeneichthys vlamingii occurs in bays, estuaries and sheltered coastal waters, normally where there are sandy and rubble bottoms near reefs in depths of 2–200 metres (6.6–656.2 ft). The juveniles frequently form schools in sheltered bays. Like other goatfishes this species uses its barbels to search I the substrate for prey, which for U vlamingii is mainly crustaceans but also some polychaete worms and a few small fish.

== Usage ==
Upeneichthys vlamingii is mostly taken as bycatch but is valued as a food fish in South Australia.

== Taxonomy and naming ==
Upeneichthys vlamingii was original described as Upeneus vlaminingii in 1829 by Georges Cuvier with the type locality given as King George Sound in Western Australia. Cuvier honoured the Dutch explorer Admiral Cornelis de Vlamingh (1678-1735). On his voyages in Australia de Vlamingh collected and illustrated fishes for the Muséum national d’Histoire naturelle in Paris and Cuvier partly based his description of this species on a copy of one of de Vlamingh's illustrations which had been copied by another illustrator. It has been treated as a subspecies of the blue-striped goatfish.
