= Upeneichthys stotti =

Scientific classification
- Kingdom: Animalia
- Phylum: Chordata
- Class: Actinopterygii
- Order: Syngnathiformes
- Family: Mullidae
- Genus: Upeneichthys
- Species: U. stotti

Binomial name
- Upeneichthys stotti Hutchins, 1990

Species of ray-finned fish

Upeneichthys stotti, Stott's goatfish, is a species of marine ray-finned fish, a goatfish from the family Mullidae. It is endemic to the eastern Indian Ocean off the coasts of Western Australia where it occurs in the inshore waters of the continental shelf. This species was described by J. Barry Hutchins in 1990 with a type locality given as north east of Rottnest Island and differentiated from Upeneichthys lineatus by differences in the snout pattern, fin proportions and smaller size. The specific name honours Chris Stoot, who as an honorary field assistant at the Western Australian Museum was involved in the collection of the paratypes.
