= Thomas' triplefin =

Conservation status
- Least Concern (IUCN 3.1)

Scientific classification
- Kingdom: Animalia
- Phylum: Chordata
- Class: Actinopterygii
- Order: Blenniiformes
- Family: Tripterygiidae
- Genus: Norfolkia
- Species: N. thomasi

Binomial name
- Norfolkia thomasi Whitley, 1964

Species of fish

Thomas' triplefin (Norfolkia thomasi) is a species of triplefin blenny in the genus Norfolkia. It was described by Gilbert Percy Whitley in 1964, naming it in honour of Leonard Rees Thomas who organised the Australian Museum's 1962 Swain Reefs Expedition. The hemispherical eggs of the Thomas' triplefin are covered in sticky threads that help anchor them in the algae on their nesting sites. This adaptation helps ensure the safety of the eggs. Once the eggs hatch, the larvae that emerge are planktonic and stick to shallow waters near the shore. The matured Thomas' triplefin then ventures out into the coral reef and intertidal pools. This species is found in the western Pacific Ocean from the Ryukyu Islands to the Tuamoto Archipelago, in Australia it is distributed from the northern Great Barrier Reef south to Byron Bay, New South Wales.
