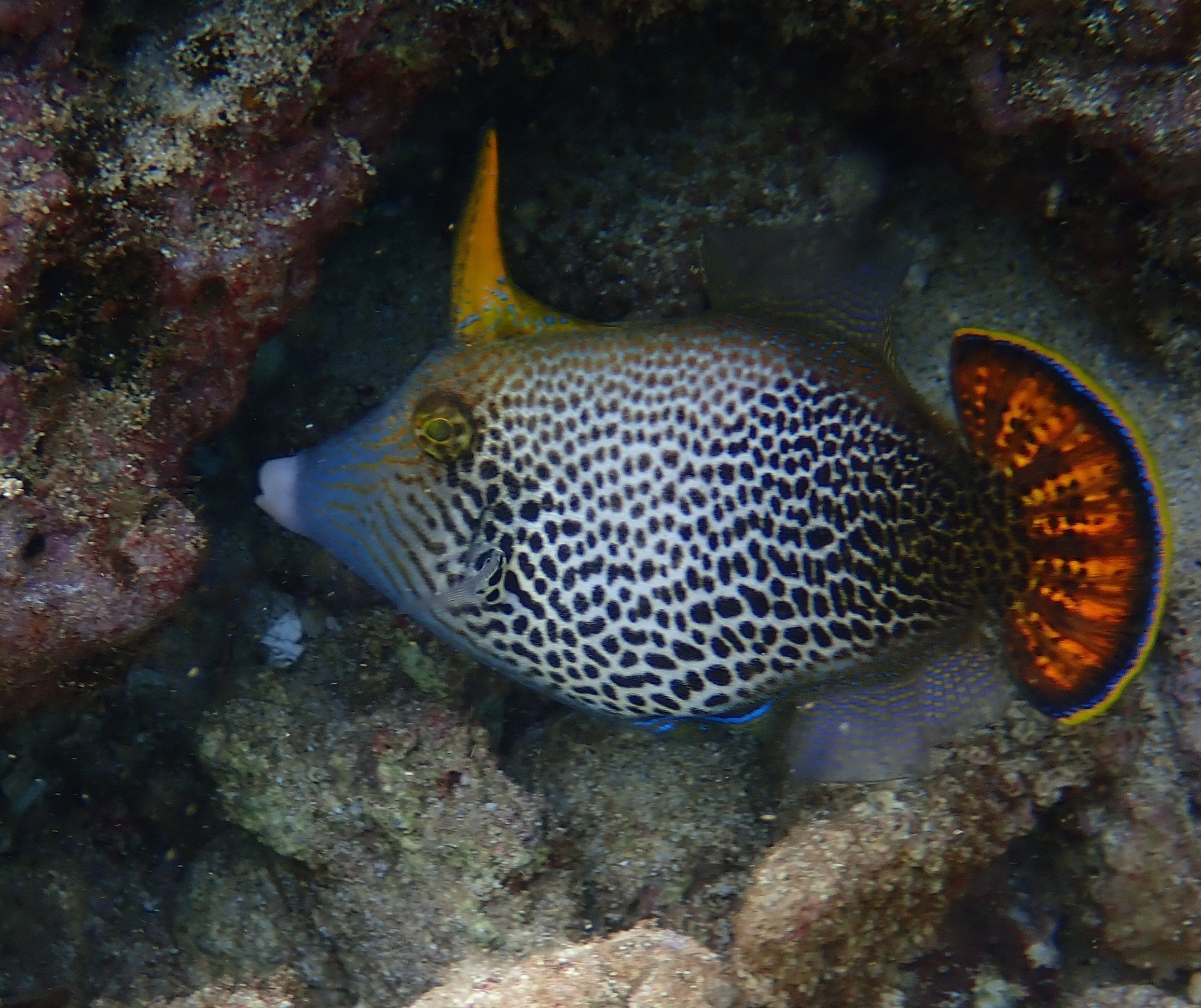
- Pervagor spilosoma, fantail filefish, Hawaii

Conservation status
- Least Concern (IUCN 3.1)

Scientific classification
- Kingdom: Animalia
- Phylum: Chordata
- Class: Actinopterygii
- Division: Teleostei
- Order: Tetraodontiformes
- Family: Monacanthidae
- Genus: Pervagor
- Species: P. spilosoma

Binomial name
- Pervagor spilosoma (Lay & E. T. Bennett, 1839)

= Pervagor spilosoma =

Species of fish

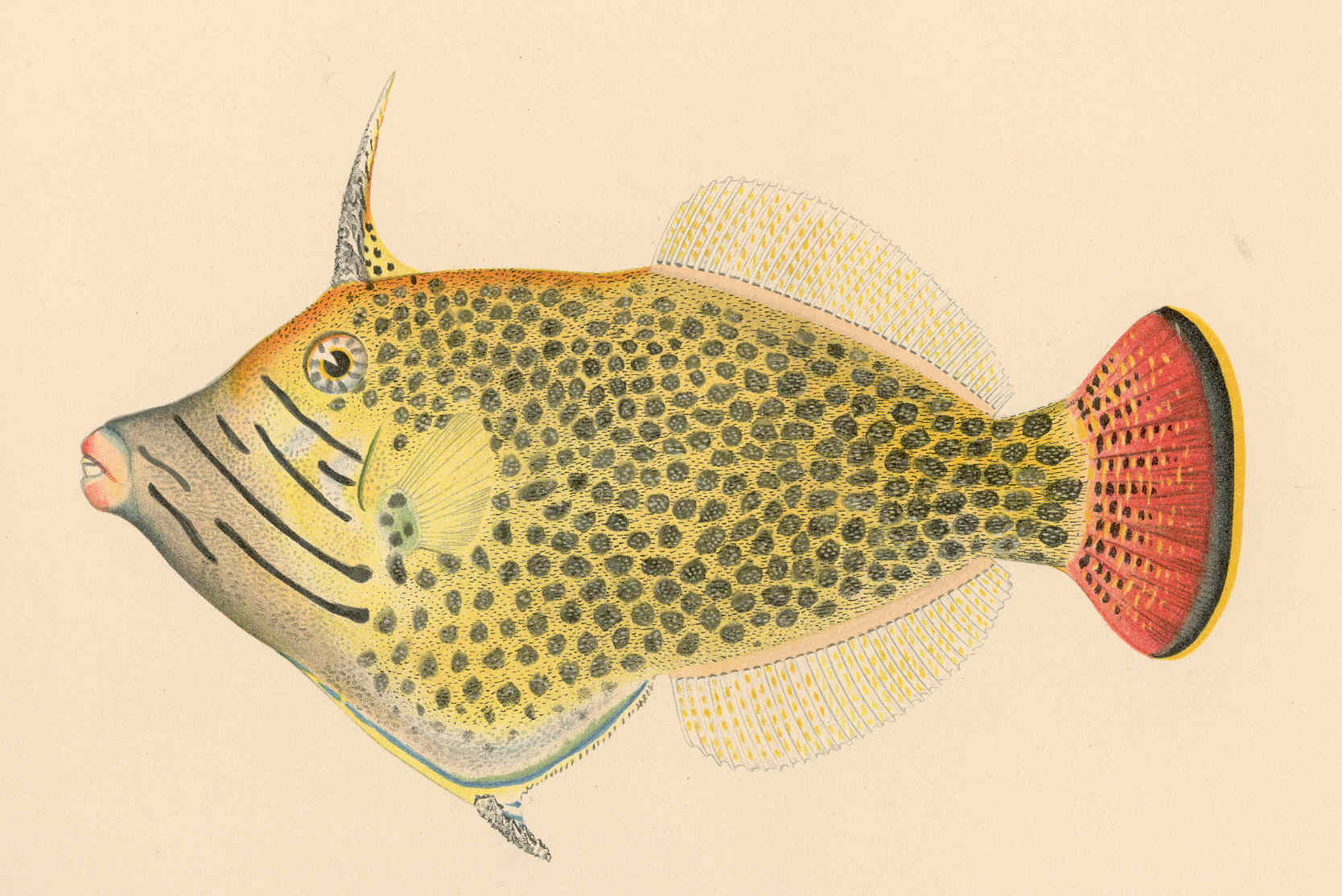

Pervagor spilosoma, the fantail filefish, is a species of filefish in the family Monacanthidae. It is found in coral reef areas of the Eastern Pacific, including the Hawaiian Islands and Johnston Island. The Hawaiian name, ōʻīli, means to "sprout" or "come up". The reason of this refers to their dorsal spine that raises up.

== Description ==
The fantail filefish has a tan body with black spots, yellow dorsal fins, and an orange tail. This species has a flat body, an asymmetrical head and dark lines with many spots on the body. In addition, the mouth area is white. Their tail or caudal fin is red or orange and their soft dorsal and anal fins are yellowish. Fantail filefish weigh 14.3–18.7 g (0.50–0.66 oz), while their brain weighs 113–116 mg.

== Population ==
Between 1985 to 1988, larger numbers of Pervagor spilosoma were observed than usual. In big numbers, Pervagor spilosoma, usually stay within shallow habitats.

== Behavior ==
Fantail filefish are rarely aggressive towards other species. Although, they do tend to be aggressive towards conspecifics.

== Diet ==
Fantail filefish feed primarily on algae and zoobenthos. This species consumes macroalgae such as seaweed, microalgae, tubeworms and small crustaceans including krill.

== Distribution and habitat ==
Fantail filefish are found inf the Eastern Pacific, including the Hawaiian Islands and Johnston Island. Fantail filefish live within coral reefs and areas that are rocky or have rubble and sand. They frequent waters that are 6–730 metres (20–2,395 ft) deep, and can survive in temperatures ranging from 41.9 to 83.4 °F (5.5 to 28.6 °C).

== Human use ==
Within the aquarium trade, fantail filefish are rare to have. It is advised that this species has an aquarium size of 75 gallons or more. The water conditions should have a salinity of 1.020–1.025 for this filefish species. The behavior of fantail filefish might change to aggressive with similar species. At first, these fish may come off as timid, but sooner or later, they become accustomed to living in new aquariums. Fantail filefish require good hiding places, so having rocks or other items would benefit this fish. Aquariums with invertebrates or reef aquariums are best to avoid because they will eat many invertebrates.
