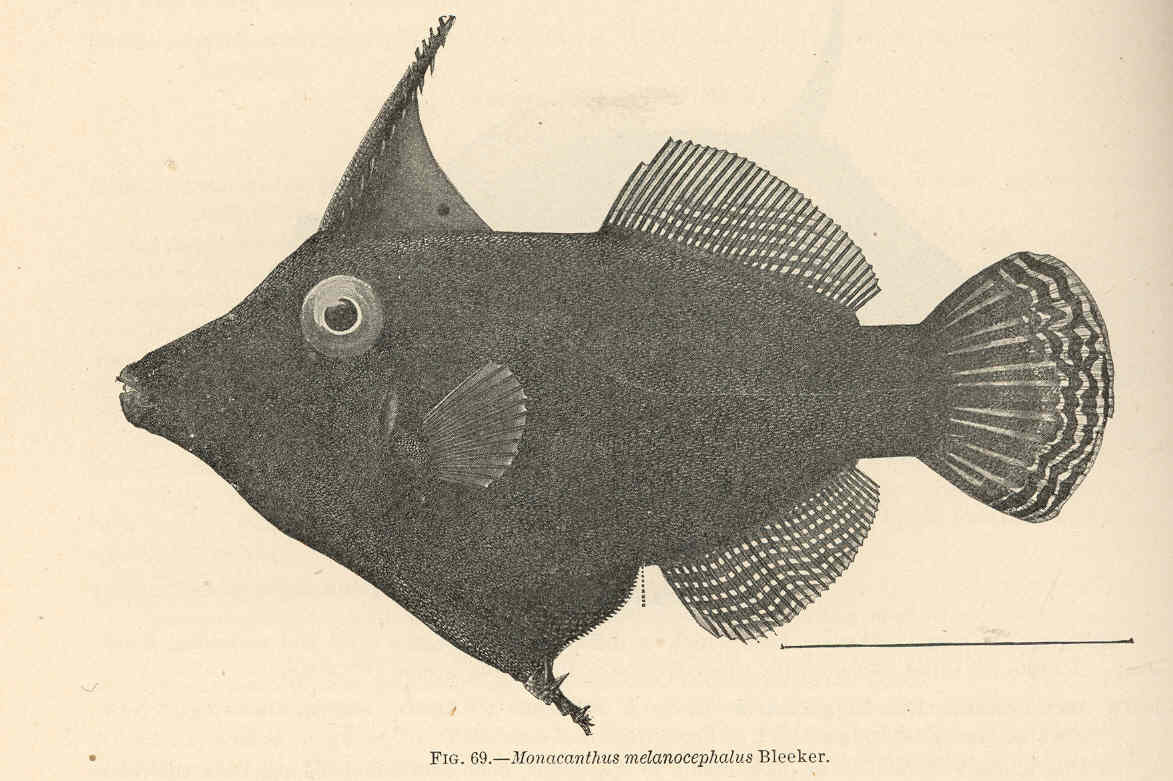

Conservation status
- Least Concern (IUCN 3.1)

Scientific classification
- Kingdom: Animalia
- Phylum: Chordata
- Class: Actinopterygii
- Order: Tetraodontiformes
- Family: Monacanthidae
- Genus: Pervagor
- Species: P. melanocephalus

Binomial name
- Pervagor melanocephalus (Bleeker, 1853)

Synonyms
- Acreichthys melanocephalus (Bleeker, 1853); Monacanthus melanocephalus Bleeker, 1853; Pervagor melanocephalus melanocephalus (Bleeker, 1853); Stephanolepis melanocephalus (Bleeker, 1853)

= Pervagor melanocephalus =

Species of fish

Pervagor melanocephalus is a filefish from the Indo-West Pacific. It occasionally makes its way into the aquarium trade. It grows to a size of 16 cm (6.3 in) in length.
