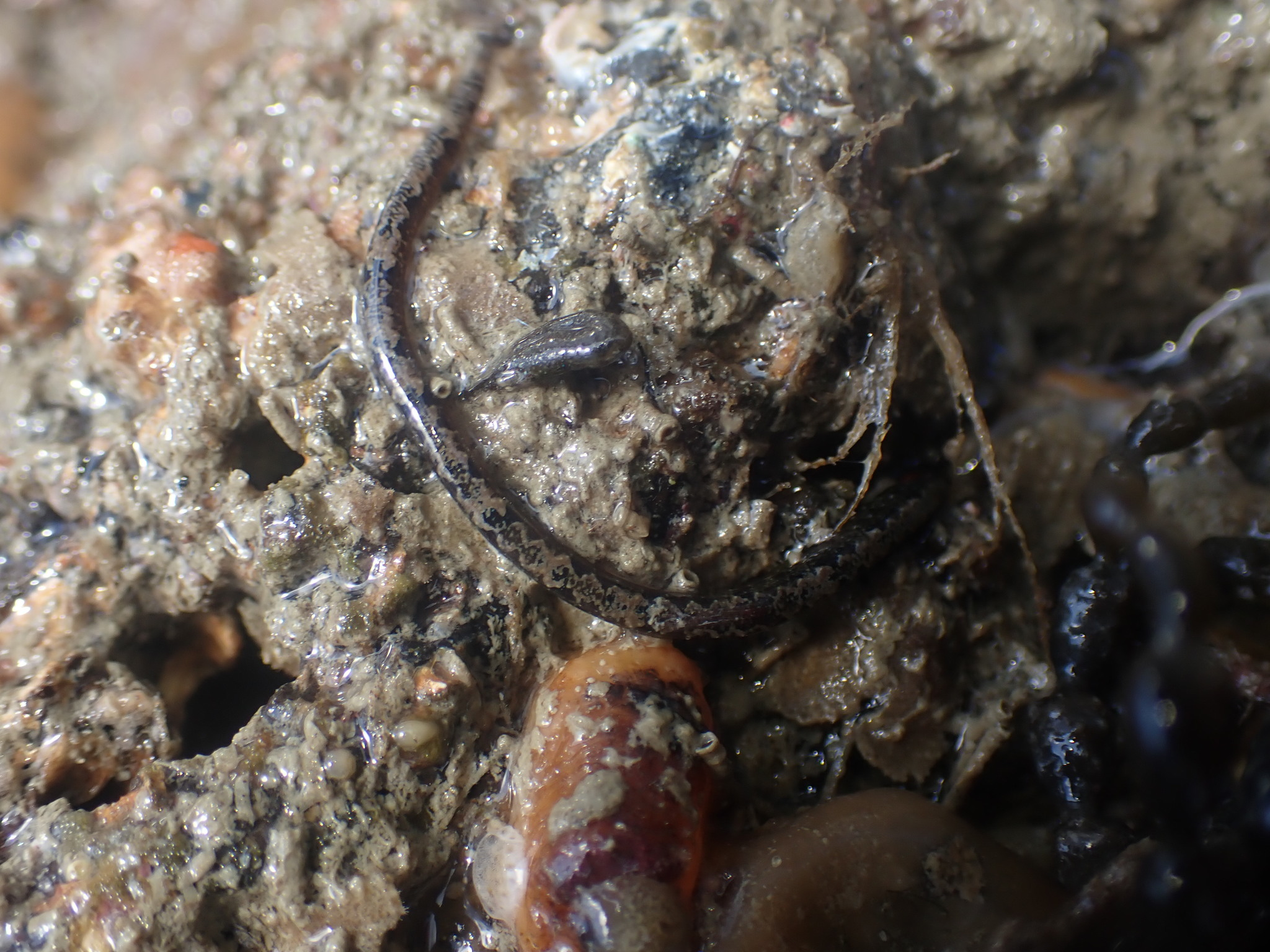

Conservation status
- Least Concern (IUCN 3.1)

Scientific classification
- Kingdom: Animalia
- Phylum: Chordata
- Class: Actinopterygii
- Division: Teleostei
- Order: Syngnathiformes
- Family: Syngnathidae
- Genus: Lissocampus
- Species: L. filum

Binomial name
- Lissocampus filum Günther 1870

= Lissocampus filum =

Shortsnout pipefish

Species of fish

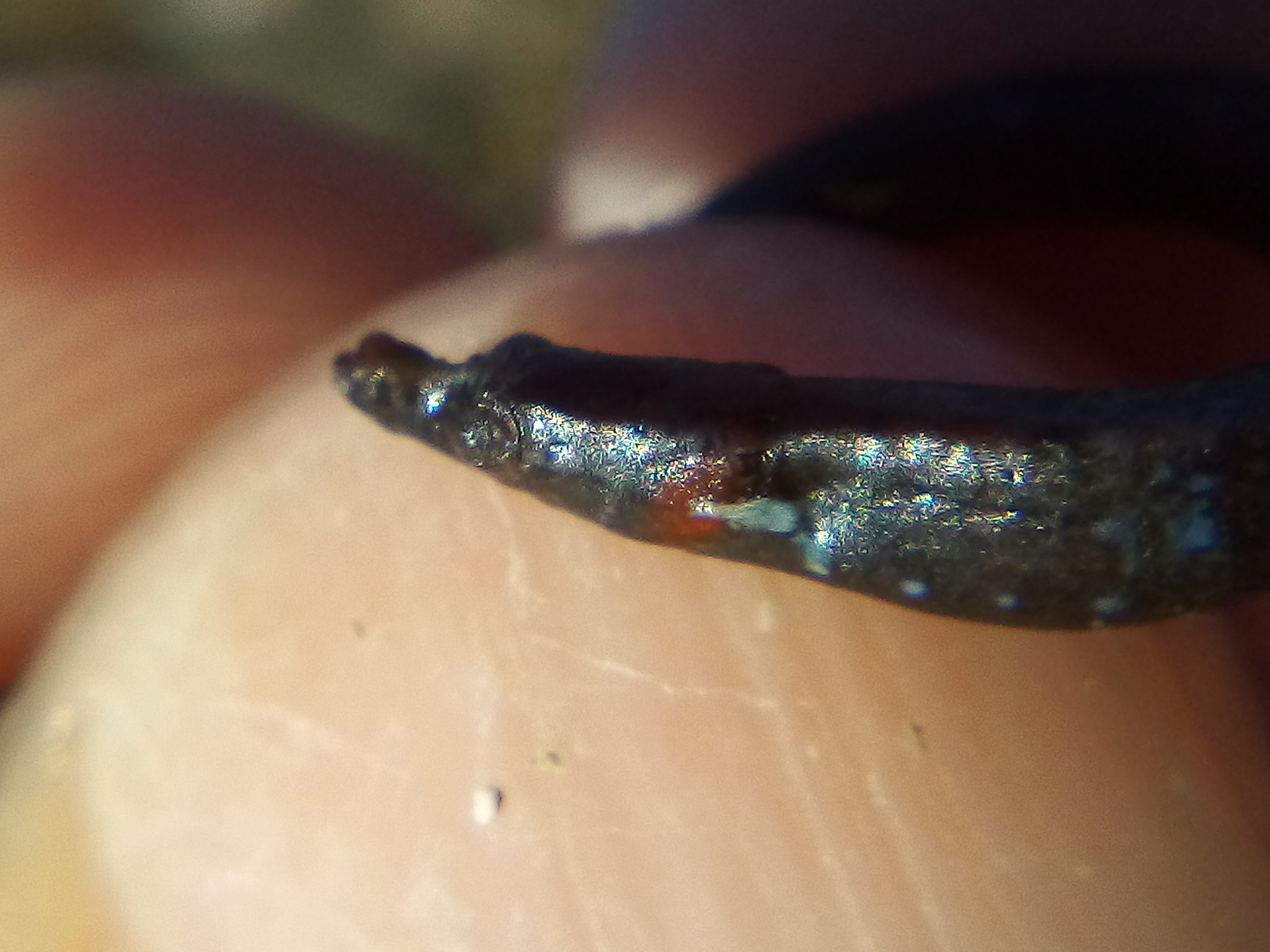
The distinctive "snout" of Lissocampus filum

Lissocampus filum, also known as the shortsnout pipefish, is a species of marine fish belonging to the family Syngnathidae. This species can be found in tidepools, algae beds, and estuaries in the coastal region surrounding New Zealand and the Chatham Islands. Its diet is thought to consist of small crustaceans such as copepods. The yellow-eyed penguin (Megadyptes antipodes) has been recorded as a predator of Lissocampus filum. Reproduction occurs through ovoviviparity in which the males brood eggs before giving live birth.
