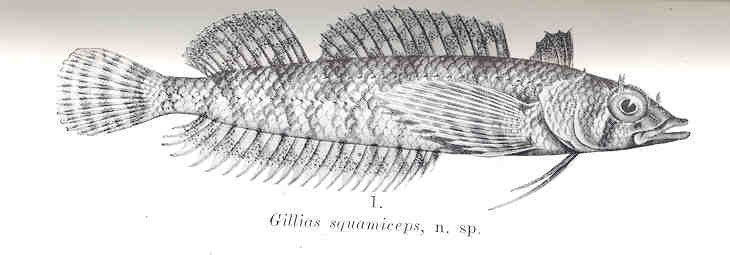

Conservation status
- Least Concern (IUCN 3.1)

Scientific classification
- Kingdom: Animalia
- Phylum: Chordata
- Class: Actinopterygii
- Order: Blenniiformes
- Family: Tripterygiidae
- Genus: Norfolkia
- Species: N. squamiceps

Binomial name
- Norfolkia squamiceps (McCulloch & Waite, 1916)

Synonyms
- Gillias squamiceps McCulloch & Waite, 1916; Norfolkia lairdi Fowler, 1953

= Scalyhead triplefin =

Species of fish

The scalyhead triplefin (Norfolkia squamiceps) is a species of triplefin blenny in the genus Norfolkia. It was described by Allan Riverstone McCulloch and Edgar Ravenswood Waite in 1916. Under the synonym Norfolkia lairdi it was the type species of Fowler's new genus. This species has been recorded from off Queensland, Norfolk Island, Lord Howe Island, New Caledonia and the Loyalty Islands. The adults occur in tidal pools among areas of coral reef.
