= Pervagor aspricaudus =

Scientific classification
- Kingdom: Animalia
- Phylum: Chordata
- Class: Actinopterygii
- Division: Teleostei
- Order: Tetraodontiformes
- Family: Monacanthidae
- Genus: Pervagor
- Species: P. aspricaudus

Binomial name
- Pervagor aspricaudus Hollard, 1854

Synonyms
- Monacanthus aspricaudus Hollard, 1854; Monacanthus rubricauda Bliss, 1883; Pervagor melanocephalus johnstonensis Woods, 1966

Species of ray-finned fish

Pervagor aspricaudus, also called orangetail filefish, is a marine fish in the family Monacanthidae. Its most striking feature derives from the vibrant colors of blue gray ombre, following a fade to an orange yellow on its fin, that gleam underwater.

== Description ==
Pervagor aspricaudus has spots on its head, seemingly followed by patterns of dashes throughout its physique. Followed by the vibrant shades of colors from its head to fin, the spinous dorsal fin are in the shades of orange and brown. Its photoreceptor pigment have a sensitive cone λ_{max} at 404 nm, allowing it to see short-wavelength light and colors that cannot be observed by humans. It feeds on small invertebrates, zooplanktons and zoobenthos.

== Distribution and habitat ==
The orangetail filefish is found in the Indo-West Pacific, including the Hawaiian islands, Japan, Australia, and Christmas Island. Recently it has also been seen near Tonga. It resides in transparent coastal and ocean-facing reefs at depths of 1–25 m (3.3–82.0 ft).

== Human use ==
Due to its striking colors and usually calm behavior, the orangetail filefish is sometimes chosen for marine aquariums.
