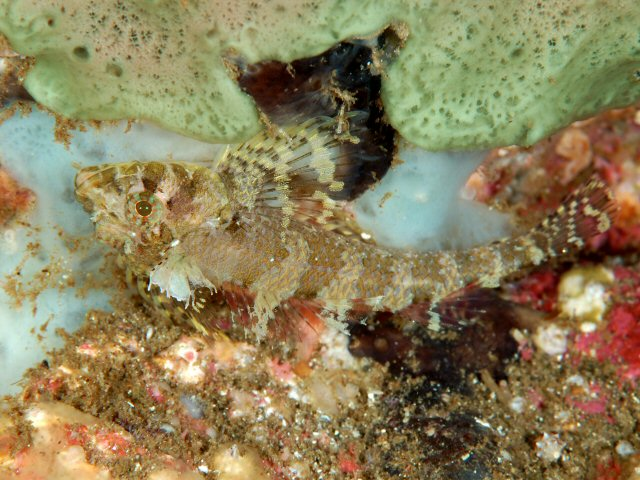
- Tropical scaly-headed triplefin (Norfolkia brachylepis)

Scientific classification
- Kingdom: Animalia
- Phylum: Chordata
- Class: Actinopterygii
- Order: Blenniiformes
- Family: Tripterygiidae
- Subfamily: Tripterygiinae
- Genus: Norfolkia; Fowler, 1953

Type species
- Norfolkia lairdi Fowler, 1953

Species
- See text.

= Norfolkia =

Genus of fishes

Norfolkia is a genus of triplefins in the family Tripterygiidae. They are found I the Indo-Pacific region.

== Species ==
There are four species currently recognised in Norfolkia:

- Tropical scaly-headed triplefin, Norfolkia brachylepis (Schultz, 1960)
- Leeuwin triplefin, Norfolkia leeuwin Fricke, 1994
- Scalyhead triplefin, Norfolkia squamiceps (McCulloch & Waite, 1916)
- Thomas' triplefin, Norfolkia thomasi Whitley, 1964

== Etymology ==
Fowler described Norfolkia lairdi from a type collected at Kingston, Norfolk Island and named the new genus after the island.
