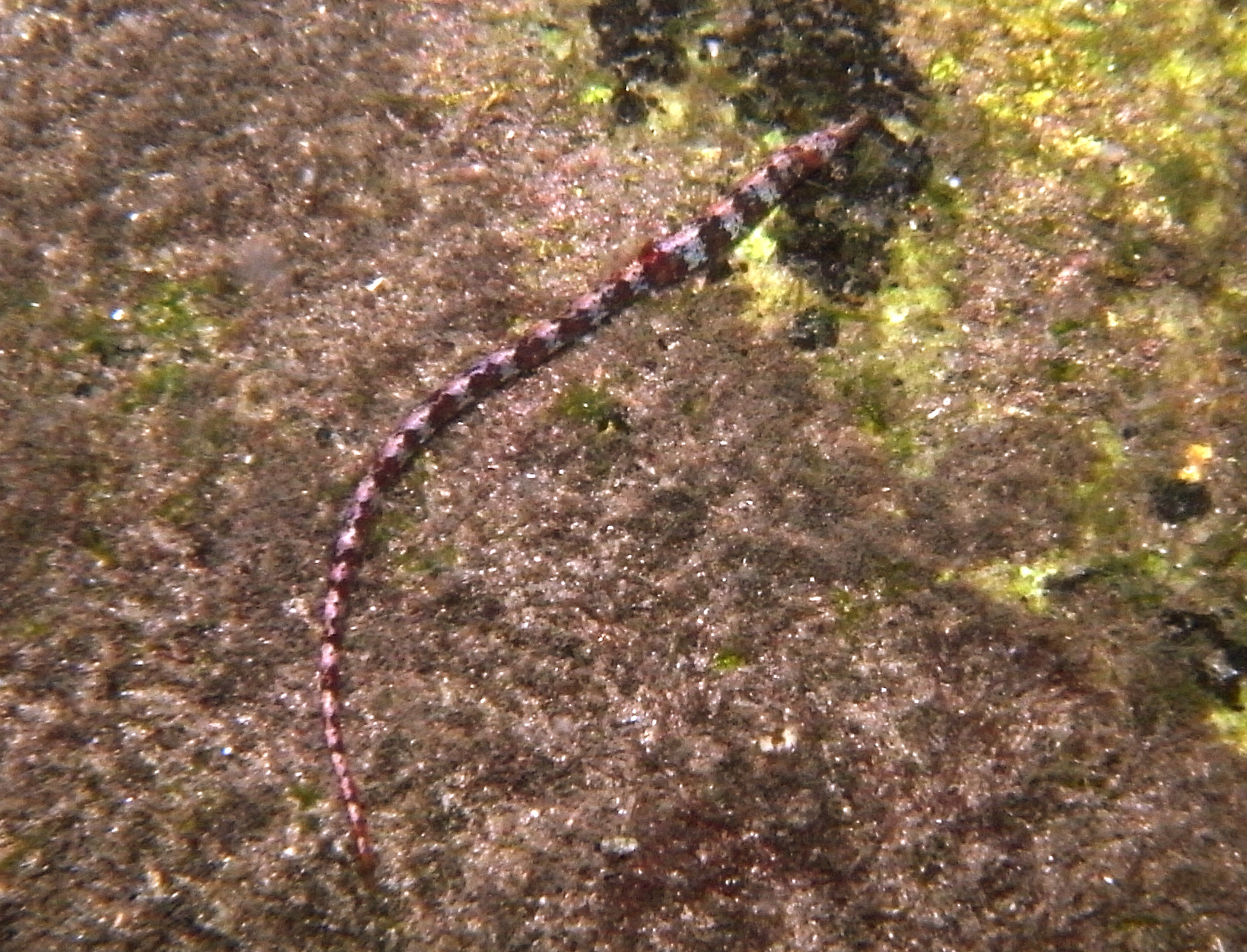

Conservation status
- Least Concern (IUCN 3.1)

Scientific classification
- Kingdom: Animalia
- Phylum: Chordata
- Class: Actinopterygii
- Division: Teleostei
- Order: Syngnathiformes
- Family: Syngnathidae
- Genus: Lissocampus
- Species: L. runa

Binomial name
- Lissocampus runa Whitley 1931

= Lissocampus runa =

Javelin pipefish

Species of fish

Lissocampus runa, also known as the javelin pipefish, is a species of marine fish belonging to the family Syngnathidae. This species can be found in algae beds, rocky reefs, tidepools, and estuaries along the coast of southern Australia from Broken Head Nature Reserve in New South Wales to Rottnest Island, Western Australia. Their diet is thought to consist of small crustaceans such as copepods. Reproduction occurs through ovoviviparity in which the males brood eggs before giving live birth.
