= Lissocampus bannwarthi =

Conservation status
- Least Concern (IUCN 3.1)

Scientific classification
- Kingdom: Animalia
- Phylum: Chordata
- Class: Actinopterygii
- Order: Syngnathiformes
- Family: Syngnathidae
- Genus: Lissocampus
- Species: L. bannwarthi

Binomial name
- Lissocampus bannwarthi Duncker, 1915

Marine pipefish in the family Syngnathidae

Lissocampus bannwarthi is a species of marine pipefish belonging to the family Syngnathidae.

They are found in the coastal waters of the northern Red Sea in sandy substrates from depths of 0 to 3 meters. Their primary food source likely consists of small crustaceans and amphipods. Reproduction occurs through ovoviviparity, in which the males carry eggs in a brood pouch underneath their tail before giving birth to live offspring.
