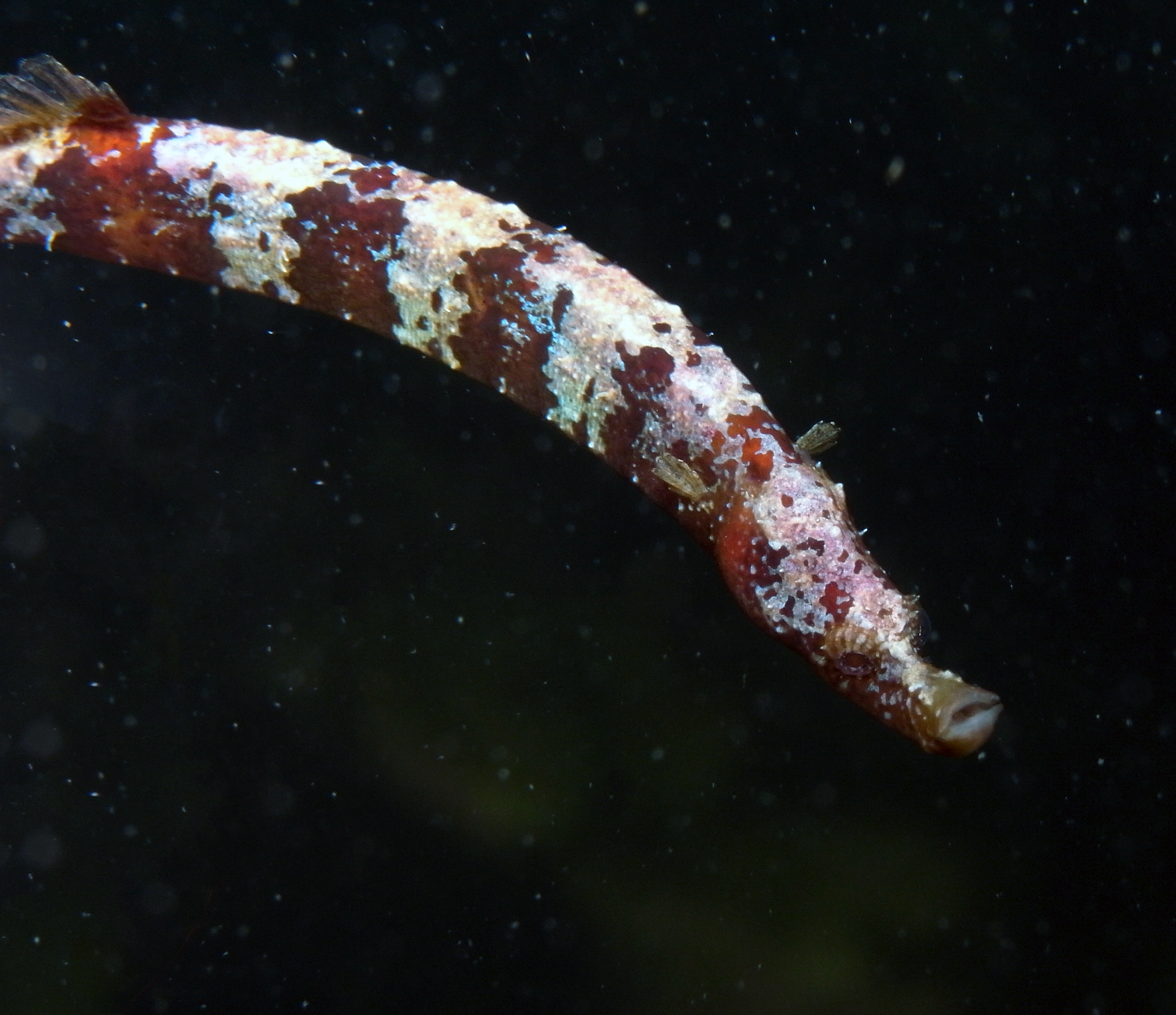
- Lissocampus runa

Scientific classification
- Kingdom: Animalia
- Phylum: Chordata
- Class: Actinopterygii
- Order: Syngnathiformes
- Family: Syngnathidae
- Subfamily: Syngnathinae
- Genus: Lissocampus; Waite & Hale, 1921

Type species
- Lissocampus caudalis Waite & Hale, 1921

Synonyms
- Larvicampus Whitley, 1948

= Lissocampus =

Genus of fishes

Lissocampus is a genus of pipefishes mostly native to the Indian Ocean. One species (L. bannwarthi) is only known to occur in the Gulf of Aqaba and the Gulf of Suez and one species (L. filum) occurs in the Pacific Ocean around New Zealand and the Chatham Islands. The remaining species are endemic to Australia.

== Species ==
The currently recognized species in this genus are:

- Lissocampus bannwarthi (Duncker, 1915)
- Lissocampus caudalis Waite & Hale, 1921 (smooth pipefish)
- Lissocampus fatiloquus (Whitley, 1943) (prophet's pipefish)
- Lissocampus filum (Günther, 1870) (shortsnout pipefish)
- Lissocampus runa (Whitley, 1931) (javelin pipefish)
