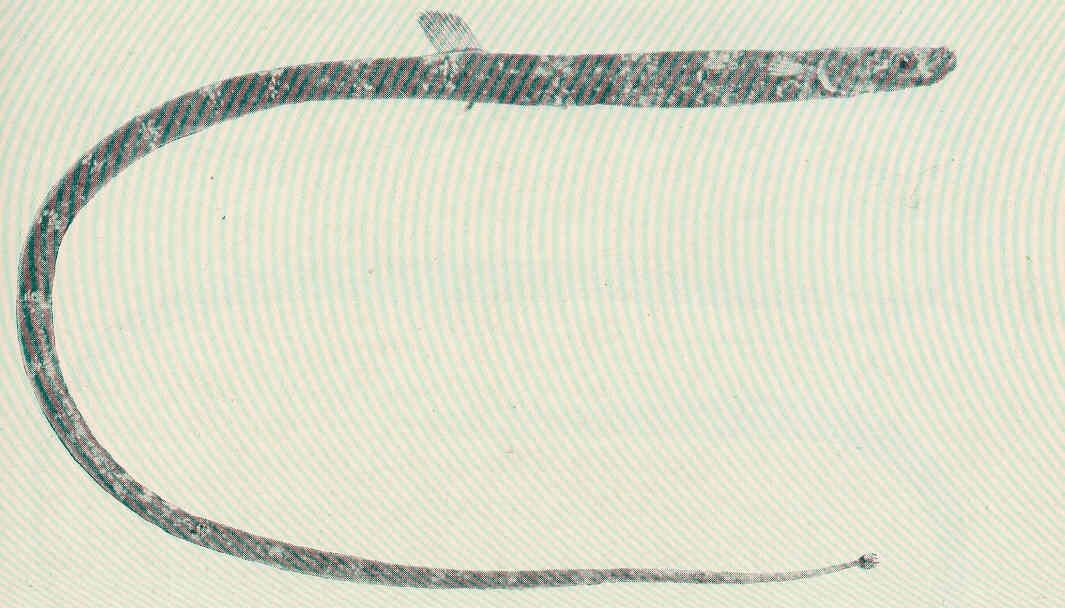

Conservation status
- Least Concern (IUCN 3.1)

Scientific classification
- Domain: Eukaryota
- Kingdom: Animalia
- Phylum: Chordata
- Class: Actinopterygii
- Order: Syngnathiformes
- Family: Syngnathidae
- Genus: Lissocampus
- Species: L. caudalis

Binomial name
- Lissocampus caudalis Waite & Hale, 1921

= Lissocampus caudalis =

Species of fish

Lissocampus caudalis, also called the Australian smooth pipefish or the smooth pipefish, is a species of marine fish belonging to the family Sygnathidae.

They are found in coastal seagrass beds, rock pools, and rocky subtidal habitats along the southern coast of Australia from Northern Tasmania to Perth. Their diet consists mostly of amphipods and copepods. Reproduction occurs through ovoviviparity, in which the males give live birth.
