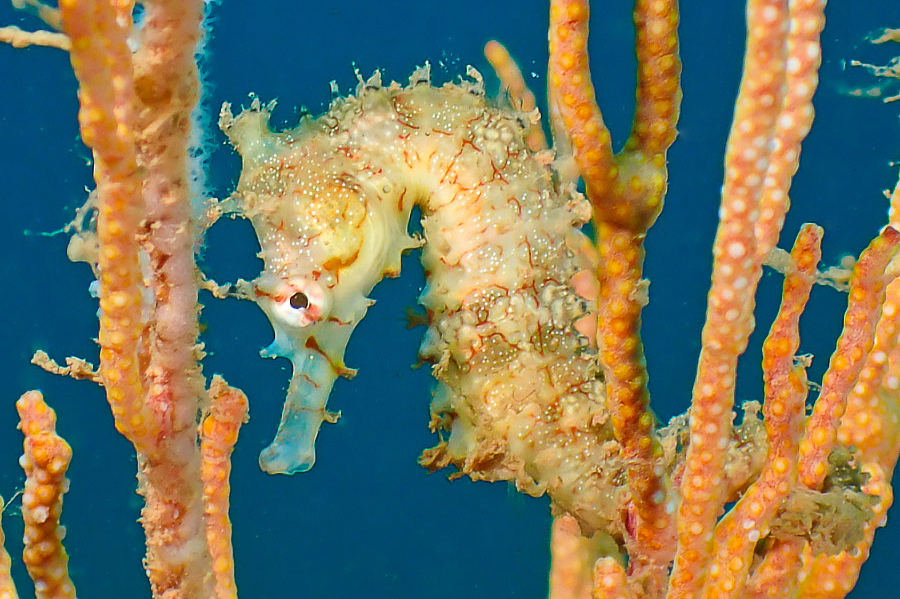

Conservation status
- Least Concern (IUCN 3.1)
- CITES Appendix II (CITES)

Scientific classification
- Kingdom: Animalia
- Phylum: Chordata
- Class: Actinopterygii
- Order: Syngnathiformes
- Family: Syngnathidae
- Genus: Hippocampus
- Species: H. angustus

Binomial name
- Hippocampus angustus Günther, 1870

Synonyms
- Hippocampus erinaceus Günther, 1870; Hippocampus hendriki Kuiter, 2001; Hippocampus multispinus Kuiter, 2001; Hippocampus grandiceps Kuiter, 2001

= Narrow-bellied seahorse =

Species of fish

Hippocampus angustus, commonly known as the narrow-bellied seahorse, western Australian seahorse, or western spiny seahorse, is a species of marine fish of the family Syngnathidae. It is found in waters off of Australia, from Perth to Hervey Bay, and the southern portion of Papua New Guinea in the Torres Strait. It lives over soft-bottom substrates, adjacent to coral reefs, and on soft corals at depths of 3–63 metres (9.8–206.7 ft). It is expected to feed on small crustaceans, similar to other seahorses. This species is ovoviviparous, with males carrying eggs in a brood pouch before giving birth to live young. This type of seahorse is monogamous in its mating patterns. The males only fertilize one female's eggs for the mating season because of the population distribution. While some seahorses can be polygamous because they are denser in population, this type of seahorse is more sparsely distributed and the cost of reproduction is high. Therefore, the risk to reproduce due to predatory and distributary factors limits this breed to one mate, often finding the same mate season after season.

== Identification ==
Individuals of this species are often around 16 centimetres (6.3 in) long, but can grow to lengths of 22 centimetres (8.7 in). They can be identified by their slender body, long snout, well developed spines and high coronet. Colouration is generally grey to brownish, with white, yellow, orange or brown scribbly, net-like markings on the head and body. The snout has 5-6 distinctive dark irregular stripes.
