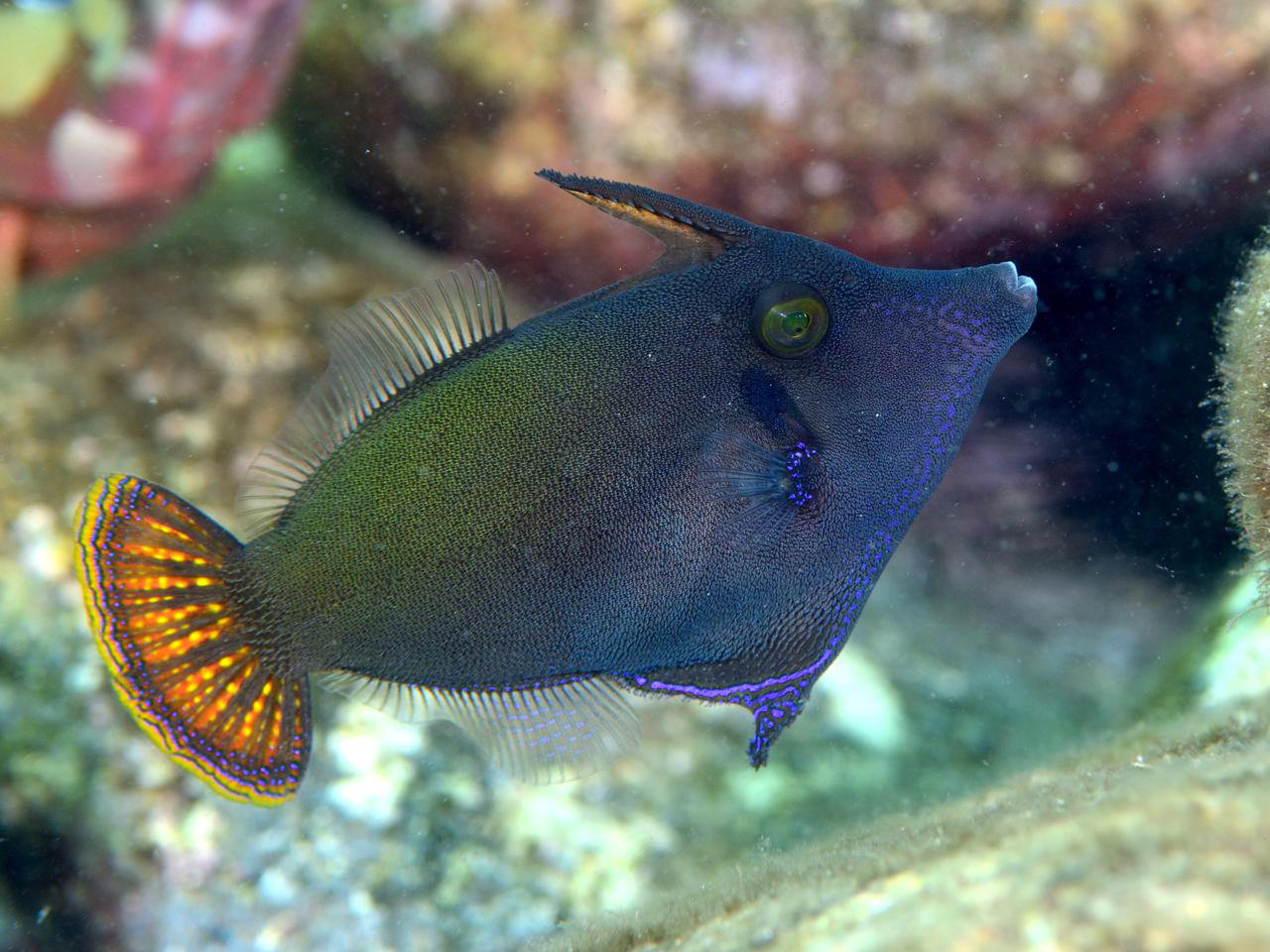

Scientific classification
- Kingdom: Animalia
- Phylum: Chordata
- Class: Actinopterygii
- Order: Tetraodontiformes
- Family: Monacanthidae
- Genus: Pervagor
- Species: P. janthinosoma

Binomial name
- Pervagor janthinosoma (Bleeker, 1854)

= Pervagor janthinosoma =

Species of fish

The blackbar filefish (Pervagor janthinosoma) is a fish in the family Monacanthidae. It is found in the tropical Indo-Pacific from the coast of east Africa to Samoa, north to southern Japan and south to New South Wales and Tonga.
