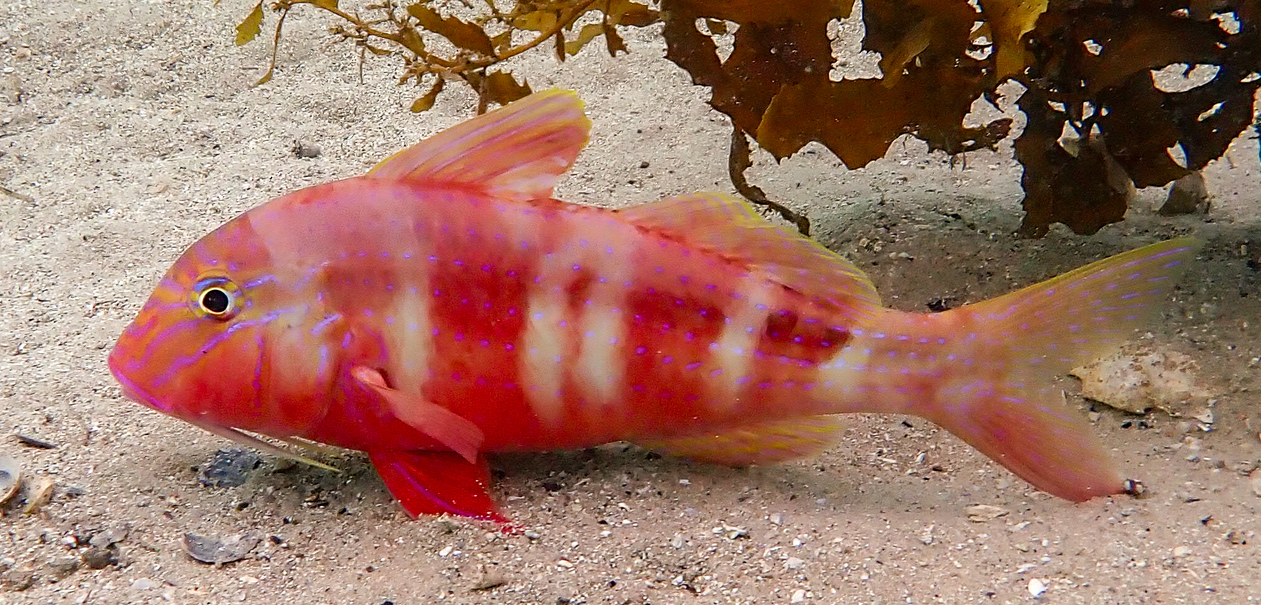

Conservation status
- Least Concern (IUCN 3.1)

Scientific classification
- Kingdom: Animalia
- Phylum: Chordata
- Class: Actinopterygii
- Order: Syngnathiformes
- Family: Mullidae
- Genus: Upeneichthys
- Species: U. lineatus

Binomial name
- Upeneichthys lineatus (Bloch & J. G. Schneider, 1801)

Synonyms
- Mullus surmuletus lineatus Bloch & J. G. Schneider, 1801; Upeneus porosus Cuvier, 1829; Upeneichthys porosus (Cuvier, 1829); Atahua clarki Phillipps, 1941

= Upeneichthys lineatus =

Species of fish

Upeneichthys lineatus, also known as the blue-striped mullet, blue-lined goatfish. blue-striped goatfish, blue-spotted goatfish and blue striped red mullet, is a species of marine ray-finned fish, a goatfish from the family Mullidae. It is native to the Pacific coast of Australia. It occurs in sheltered areas over rocky and sandy substrates and can be found 5 to 100 metres (16 to 328 ft), though rarer below 40 metres (130 ft). This species can reach a length of 40 centimetres (16 in) FL. This species is commercially important.

== Taxonomy ==
Upeneichthys lineatus was first formally described as Mullus surmuletus lineatus by Marcus Elieser Bloch and Johann Gottlob Schneider in 1801.

The taxon Upeneichthys porosus was first described in 1829 as Upeneus porosus by Georges Cuvier from the Bay of Plenty in New Zealand and some authorities regard this as a valid species found around New Zealand, the Kermadec Islands and Norfolk Island. Other authorities treat U. porosus as a valid taxon but as a subspecies of U. lineatus, U.l. porosus.

== Description ==
Upeneichthys lineatus has a small, fleshy-lipped mouth with each jaw armed with a single row of conical teeth. Like the other members of the family Mullidae it has two fleshy barbels on its chin. They are highly variable in colour, which ranges from pale cream to deep red, normally with blue and gold lines on the face and thin yellow lines and blue dots along the flanks and tail. They have a distinct mid-lateral stripe, and yellow stripes on the dorsal and anal fins. They may attain a length of 31 centimetres (12 in) They have 9 spines and 8 rays in their dorsal fins and a single spine and 6 rays in their anal fins.

== Distribution ==
Upeneichthys lineatus is endemic to the temperate seas off eastern and southeastern Australia with the northerly limit of their range being around Fraser Island, Queensland south to Tasmania and west as far as Lakes Entrance, Victoria. See Taxonomy for other areas it may be found.

== Habitat and biology ==
Upeneichthys lineatus is found over sandy bottoms in sheltered waters such as in bays and harbours, where they use their sensory barbels to probe the sediment for prey. They will live over varying substrates ranging from smooth bottoms, to rock and shell adorned bottoms. They frequently forage over the seabed in small schools, at depths of 5–200 metres (16–656 ft). Their teeth are rather fine and they do not have crushing molar like teeth and their prey is small molluscs, crustaceans, echinoderms and fishes, also larger soft-bodied animals similar to polychaetes. They have separate sexes and fertilisation is external, with spawning occurring above the bottom and both the eggs and larvae are pelagic.
