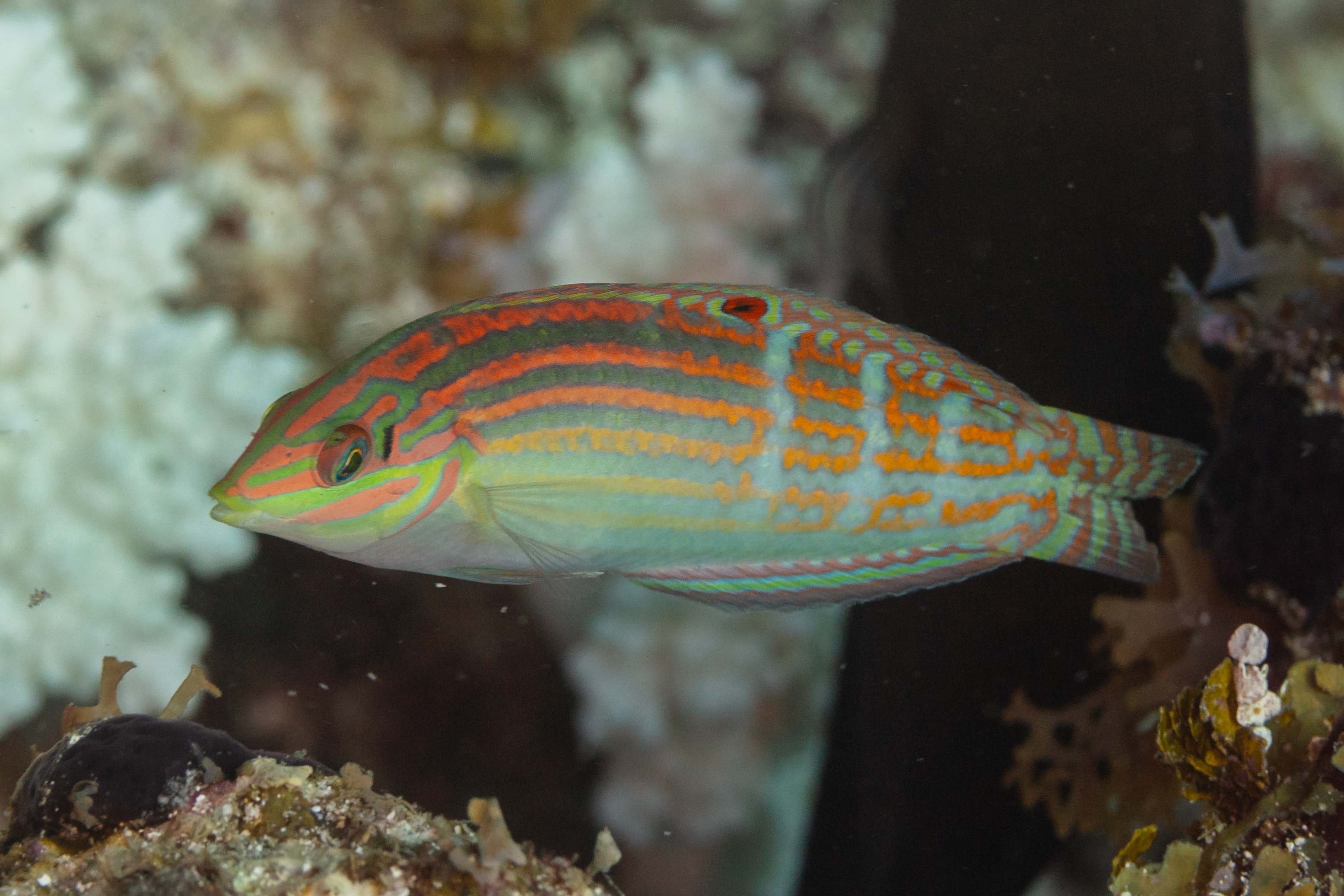

Conservation status
- Least Concern (IUCN 3.1)

Scientific classification
- Kingdom: Animalia
- Phylum: Chordata
- Class: Actinopterygii
- Order: Labriformes
- Family: Labridae
- Genus: Halichoeres
- Species: H. nebulosus

Binomial name
- Halichoeres nebulosus (Valenciennes, 1839)

Synonyms
- Julis nebulosus Valenciennes, 1839; Julis pseudominiatus Bleeker, 1856; Julis reichei Bleeker, 1856; Halichoeres reichei (Bleeker, 1857); Pseudojulis maculifer Castelnau, 1875

= Nebulous wrasse =

Species of fish

The nebulous wrasse (Halichoeres nebulosus) is a species of wrasse native to the Indian Ocean and the western Pacific Ocean. It can be found in groups at depths from 1 to 40 m (3.3 to 131.2 ft) on reef flats. This species feeds on fish eggs and benthic invertebrates, including crabs, sea urchins, ophiuroids, polychaetes, sponges and mollusks. Its coloration varies, ranging from brown to dark green. This species can reach 12 cm (4.7 in) in total length. It can be found in the aquarium trade.
