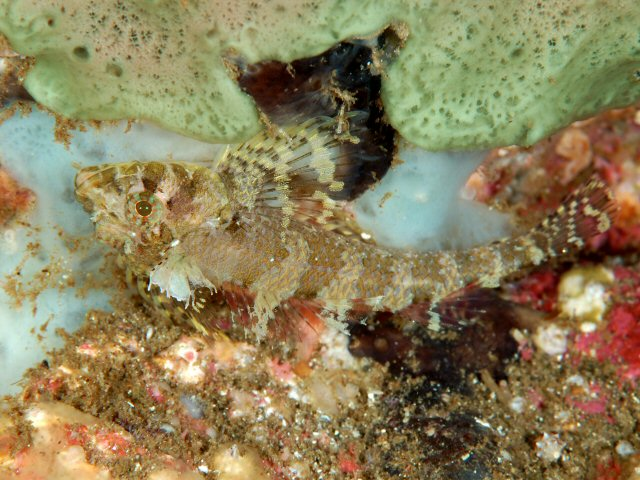

Conservation status
- Least Concern (IUCN 3.1)

Scientific classification
- Kingdom: Animalia
- Phylum: Chordata
- Class: Actinopterygii
- Order: Blenniiformes
- Family: Tripterygiidae
- Genus: Norfolkia
- Species: N. brachylepis

Binomial name
- Norfolkia brachylepis (Schultz, 1960)

Synonyms
- Tripterygion brachylepis Schultz, 1960; Enneapterygius brachylepis (Schultz, 1960); Norfolkia springeri Clark, 1980

= Tropical scaly-headed triplefin =

Species of fish

The tropical scaly-headed triplefin (Norfolkia brachylepis) is a species of triplefin blenny in the genus Norfolkia. It was described by Leonard Schultz in 1960. This is an Indo-Pacific species which is distributed from the Red Sea to Fiji, north to the Izu Islands and south to Australia.
