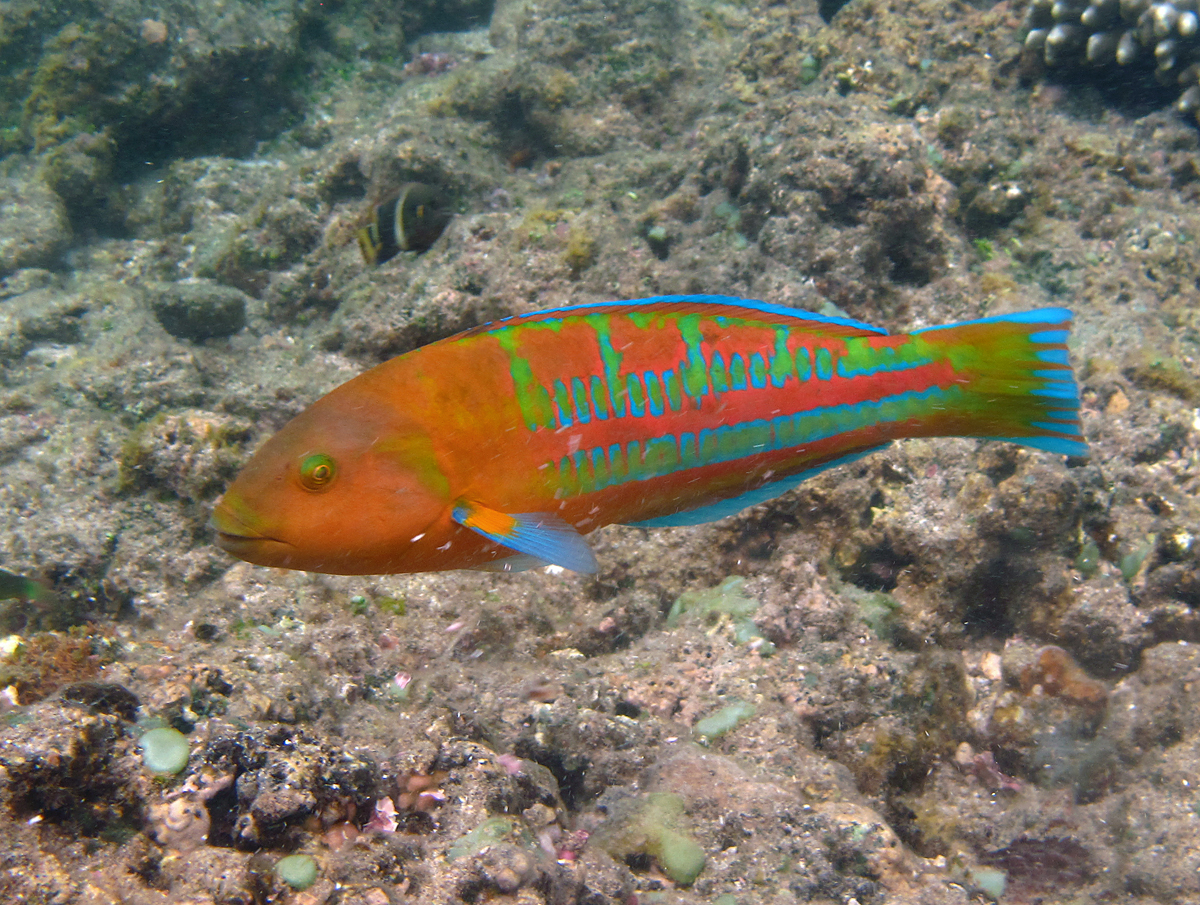

Conservation status
- Least Concern (IUCN 3.1)

Scientific classification
- Kingdom: Animalia
- Phylum: Chordata
- Class: Actinopterygii
- Order: Labriformes
- Family: Labridae
- Genus: Thalassoma
- Species: T. trilobatum

Binomial name
- Thalassoma trilobatum (Lacépède, 1801)

Synonyms
- Labrus trilobatus Lacépède, 1801; Labrus fuscus Lacépède, 1801

= Christmas wrasse =

Species of fish

The Christmas wrasse (Thalassoma trilobatum), also known as the ladder wrasse, green-barred wrasse or green-blocked wrasse, is a species of ray-finned fish, a wrasse from the family Labridae which is native to the Indian Ocean and the western Pacific Ocean. It inhabits shallow reefs at depths from the surface to 10 m (33 ft). It is of minor importance to local commercial fisheries and can be found in the aquarium trade.

== Description ==
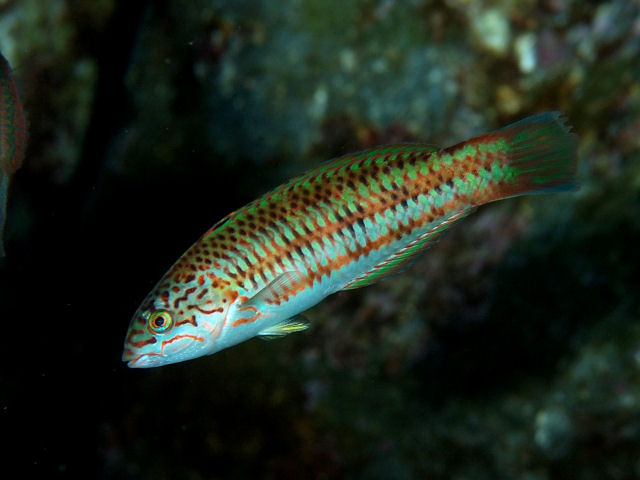
In Japan

The Christmas wrasse has 8 spines and 13 soft rays in its dorsal fin and 3 spines and 11 soft rays in its anal fin. There are normally 16 rays in the pectoral fins and there are 25 scales in the lateral line. In the initial phase, or females, the caudal fin may be slightly rounded or truncate while in the terminal phase males it can be truncate or a little double emarginated. The females are greenish grey to pale green in body colour with 5–6 dark blotches on the back and a pair of dark, not all that well defined stripes on the flank. Most of the scales on a female's body have a dark vertical line. There is also a diagonal or C-shaped pink to dark red marking below the front of the eye. The males in terminal phase have a body colour which is salmon-pink to orange towards the head, with 2 horizontal series of green rectangles with their long sides on the vertical with each fourth pair of the upper series extending to create a single green bar across the male's back. The head orange-brown in colour and has no bands and the tail is brownish to greenish, shading towards its margin to pink and having the rays in the last third coloured blue. This fish is similar to the surge wrasse (Thalassoma purpureum) but is distinguished from it by the spotted head of the females, the lack of a 'V-shaped' mark on the snout and, in the males, by the head colour. They can grow up to 30 centimetres (12 in) in total length.

== Distribution ==
The Christmas wrasse has a wide Indo-Pacific distribution, occurring on the east coast of Africa from Somalia to South Africa, although there are no records from Madagascar it occurs through the Indian Ocean and east into the Pacific as far as Pitcairn Island. Its Pacific range extends north to the Ryukyu Islands and south to northern New South Wales.

== Habitat and biology ==
The Christmas wrasse is found at the wave-exposed reef margins and reef flats, where there is a mixture of coral, algae and seagrass at depths between 0 and 10 metres (0 and 33 ft). It is a carnivorous species which feeds on a variety of small invertebrates such as crabs, molluscs and brittle stars. The diet of the youngest fish is mainly small benthic invertebrates. They are oviparous and the male and female pair up to spawn, once the eggs hatch the larval stage lasts from 60–99 days.

== Species description ==
The Christmas wrasse was first formally described as Labrus trilobatus in 1801 by the French naturalist Bernard Germain de Lacépède (1756–1825) with the type locality given as Mauritius.

== Human usage ==
The Christmas wrasse is a commercially important species in the aquarium trade, although it grows too large for most home aquaria. It is only of minor and local interest to artisanal and subsistence fisheries.
