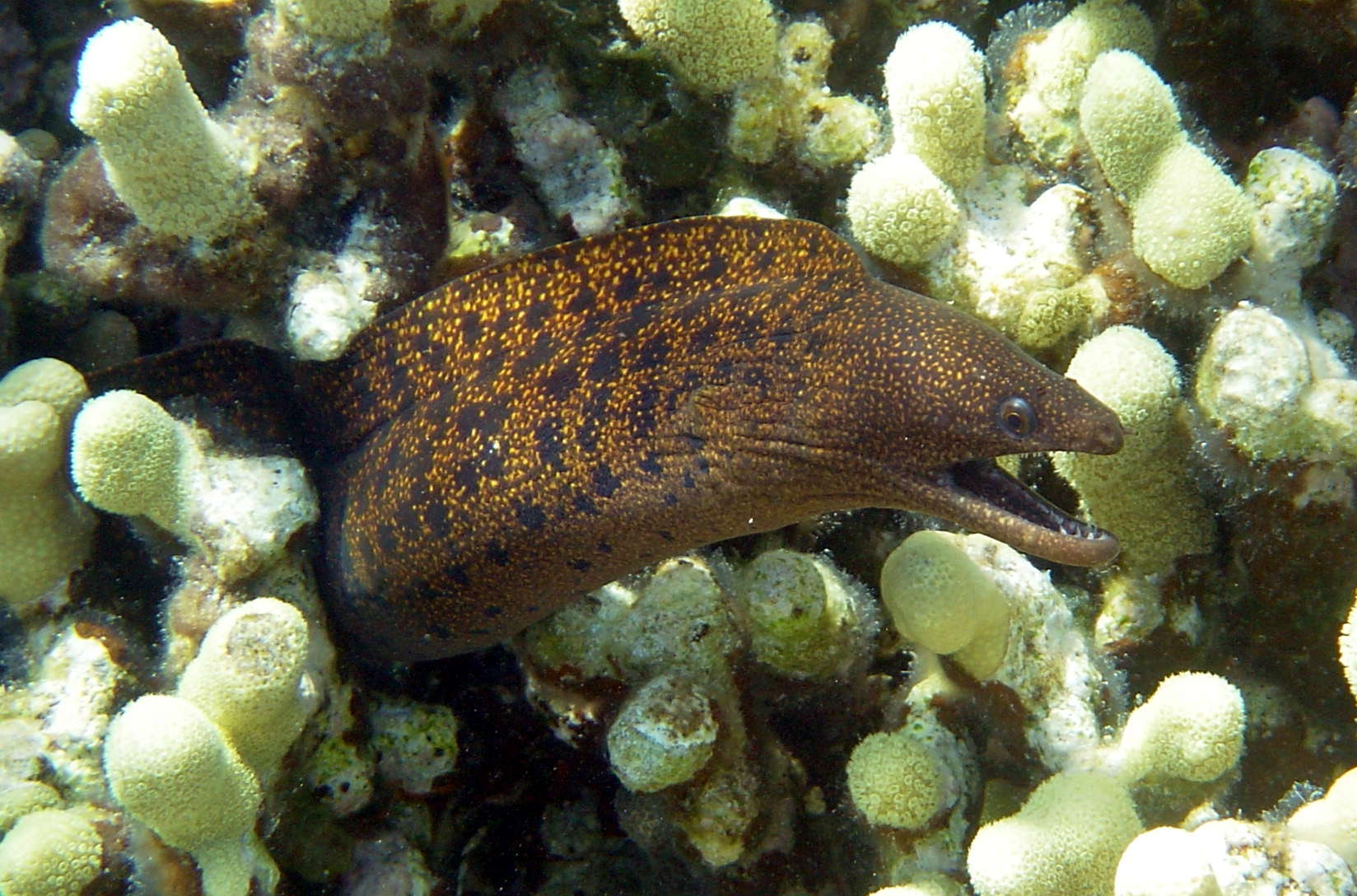

Conservation status
- Least Concern (IUCN 3.1)

Scientific classification
- Kingdom: Animalia
- Phylum: Chordata
- Class: Actinopterygii
- Division: Teleostei
- Order: Anguilliformes
- Family: Muraenidae
- Genus: Gymnothorax
- Species: G. eurostus

Binomial name
- Gymnothorax eurostus (C. C. Abbott, 1860)

Synonyms
- Lycodontis eurostus (Abbott, 1860); Thyrsoidea eurosta Abbott, 1860 [1]; Gymnothorax dentex de Buen, 1961; Gymnothorax gilberti Tanaka, 1908; Gymnothorax wakanourae Tanaka, 1908; Gymnothorax chalazius Waite, 1904; Gymnothorax ercodes Jenkins, 1903; Gymnothorax laysanus (Steindachner, 1900); Lycodontis laysanus (Steindachner, 1900); Muraena laysana Steindachner, 1900; Lycodontis parvibranchialis Fowler, 1900

= Abbott's moray eel =

Species of fish

Abbott's moray eel (Gymnothorax eurostus), also known as the stout moray and the salt and pepper moray, is a moray eel of the family Muraenidae. G. eurostus is found in the Indo-Pacific, and its range exhibits an antitropical distribution. It is the most common moray eel in the Hawaiian Islands. Abbott's moray is found in the eastern Pacific Ocean from Costa Rica to Easter Island, at depths down to 74 m (243 ft). With a body that is variable in color, the length of this species is up to 60 cm (24 in).

== Description ==
Abbott's moray eel reaches up to 60 cm (24 in) while containing around 120 to 123 vertebrae. Lacking pectoral fins, Abbott's moray eel has skin protected by a mucus layer that is released by the goblet cells in the epidermis. The color is variable, ranging from reddish brown with yellow spots throughout the body, to tan or brown coloring with pale spots that may have darker spots over them.

== Distribution and habitat ==
The distribution of Abbott's moray eel is temperature related, as it is found in the Indo-Pacific between latitudes 16 and 32 degrees north and south. It is found throughout the Hawaiian Islands, Johnston Island, Easter Island, Austral Islands, Lord Howe Island, Heron Island, Marcus Island, Taiwan, Ryukyu Islands, Japan, Bazaruto Island, and Mozambique. Abbott's moray eel lives in coastal reef habitats in spaces like crevices, caves, and under rocky ledges. It can be found in shallow waters down to a depth of 74 m (243 ft), but is most frequently found at depths of 3 to 5 m (9.8 to 16.4 ft).

== Ecology and diet ==
Abbott's moray eel is a voracious nocturnal carnivore, feeding mostly on reef fishes. Lironeca puhi is a common parasite of the Abbott's moray eel, with around 15 to 70% of the eel population being infected by the parasite. An Abbott's moray eel that is infected will typically have both a female and male Lironeca in a single, left or right gill chamber.
