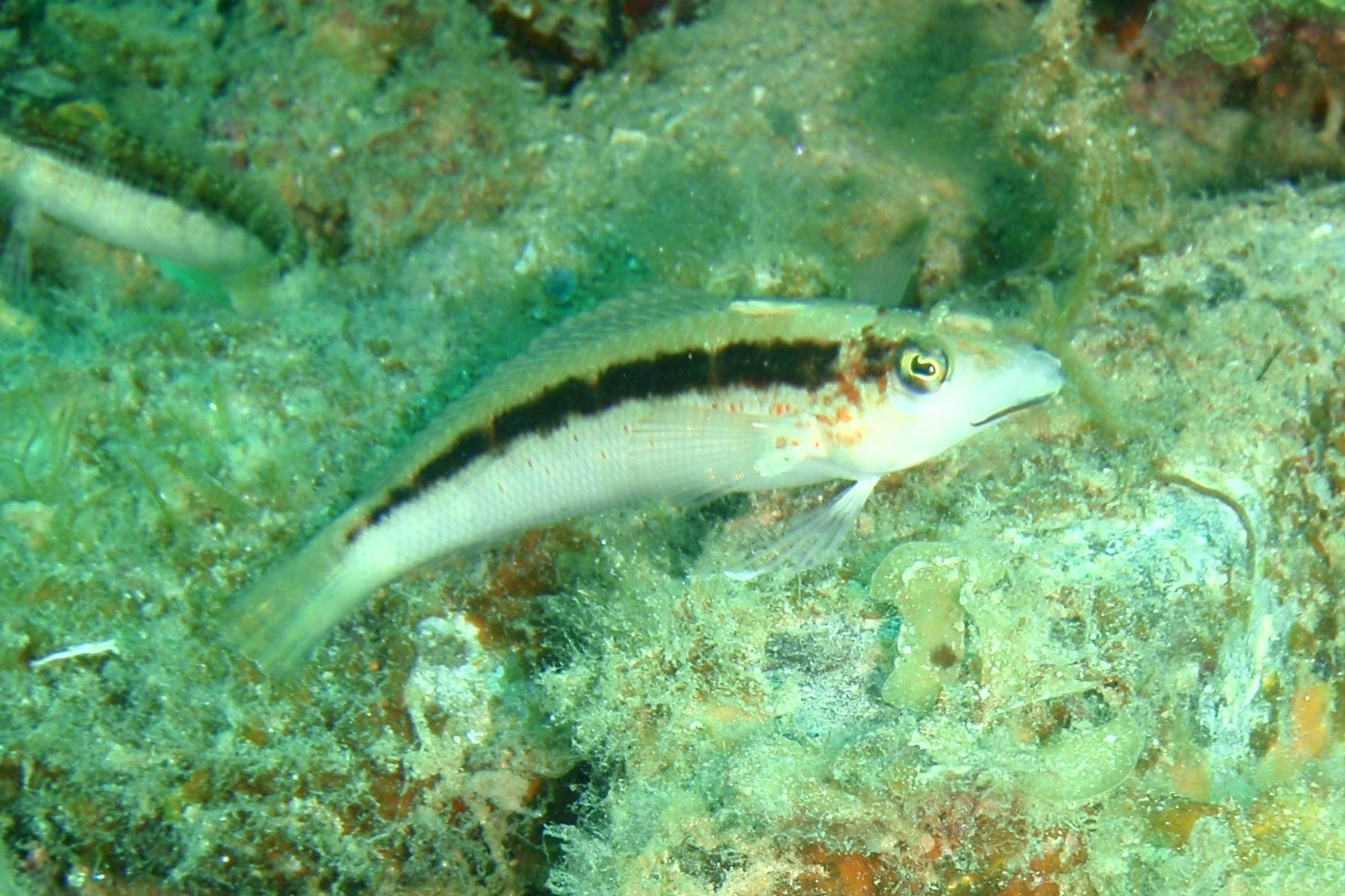

Scientific classification
- Kingdom: Animalia
- Phylum: Chordata
- Class: Actinopterygii
- Order: Labriformes
- Family: Pinguipedidae
- Genus: Parapercis
- Species: P. haackei

Binomial name
- Parapercis haackei Steindachner, 1884

= Parapercis haackei =

Species of ray-finned fish

Parapercis haackei, the wavy grubfish, is a species of ray-finned fish in the sandperch family, Pinguipedidae. It is found in the eastern Indian Ocean around southern Western Australia and South Australia.

== Description ==
Parapercis haackei reaches a total length of 10.0 cm (3.9 in).

== Etymology ==
The fish is named in honour of Johann Wilhelm Haacke (1855-1912), a German zoologist who emigrated to New Zealand and Australia, thus becoming director of the Adelaide Natural History Museum, which provided Steindachner with fishes from the St. Vincent Gulf in South Australia.
