= Leeuwin triplefin =

Conservation status
- Least Concern (IUCN 3.1)

Scientific classification
- Kingdom: Animalia
- Phylum: Chordata
- Class: Actinopterygii
- Order: Blenniiformes
- Family: Tripterygiidae
- Genus: Norfolkia
- Species: N. leeuwin

Binomial name
- Norfolkia leeuwin Fricke, 1994

Species of fish

The Leeuwin triplefin (Norfolkia leeuwin) is a species of triplefin blenny in the genus Norfolkia. It was described by Ronald Fricke in 1994. This species is found in the southern part of the coast of Western Australia from the Houtmon's Abrolhos Islands to the Recherche Archipelago. It is found in rocky reefs. Its specific name references the Leeuwin Current which influences the coastal areas in which this fish occurs.
