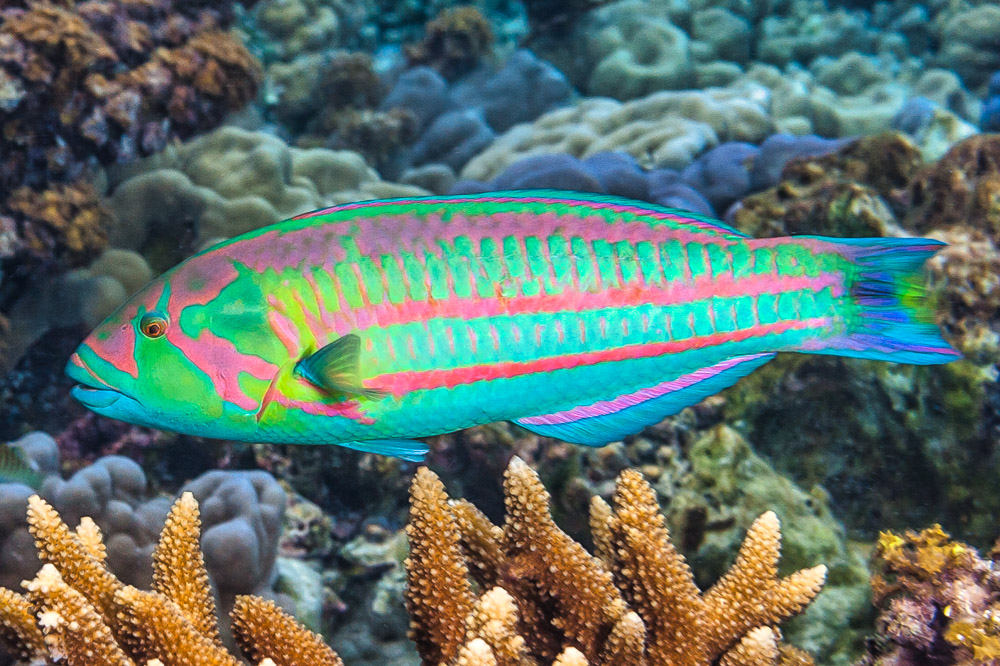
- Male (terminal phase)

Conservation status
- Least Concern (IUCN 3.1)

Scientific classification
- Kingdom: Animalia
- Phylum: Chordata
- Class: Actinopterygii
- Order: Labriformes
- Family: Labridae
- Genus: Thalassoma
- Species: T. purpureum

Binomial name
- Thalassoma purpureum (Forsskål, 1775)

Synonyms
- Scarus purpureus Forsskål, 1775; Julis semicoeruleus Rüppell, 1835; Thalassoma semicoeruleus (Rüppell, 1835); Julis umbrostygma Rüppell, 1835; Thalassoma umbrostygma (Rüppell, 1835)

= Surge wrasse =

Species of fish

The surge wrasse (Thalassoma purpureum), also known as the green-blocked wrasse, purple wrasse or red and green wrasse, is a species of wrasse native to the southeast Atlantic Ocean through the Indian and Pacific Oceans, where it inhabits reefs and rocky coastlines in areas of heavy wave action at depths from the surface to 10 m (33 ft). This species is of minor importance to local commercial fisheries, is popular as a game fish, and can be found in the aquarium trade.

== Description ==
The surge wrasse has 8 spines and 12-14 soft rays in its dorsal fin while the anal fin has 3 spines and 10-12 soft rays. It can grow to 46 cm (18 in) in total length and 1.2 kg (2.6 lb) in weight. It has a rather deep, laterally compressed body and a pair of caniniform teeth in the front of its bottom jaw. This is a colourful species of wrasse in which the females are greenish with their snout marked with a dark red V. The males are greenish-blue in colour with two bright reddish stripes along their flanks and they have a large head with a blunt snout which is greenish-blue with pinkish-purple markings. It is very similar to the ladder wrasse (Thalassoma trilobatum), especially the females, but the surge wrasse has a larger head and no spots on the head.

== Distribution ==
The surge wrasse has a wide Indo-Pacific distribution which extends marginally into the south-eastern Atlantic along the coast of South Africa. Its main distribution in the Indian Ocean extends from the Red Sea south to South Africa east through the Indian Ocean islands and coasts of Asia to the Pacific Ocean where it extends north to Japan and south to Lord Howe Island, Kermadec Islands, and Rapa Islands and east as far as Panama in the eastern Pacific.

== Habitat and biology ==
The surge wrasse, as its name suggests, is found in the surge zone of outer reef flats and on the reef margins of coral and rocky reefs. It is normally found in depths of less than 10 metres (33 ft). It lives groups of females which are spread out over large areas of reef and which are dominated by a few males which grow much larger than females. It is a carnivorous species which preys on small invertebrates such as crabs, sea urchins, brittlestars and molluscs, as well as small fishes and polychaete worms. It is a protogynous hermaphrodite, females change sex to become males and it is a pelagic spawner.

== Taxonomy and species description ==
The surge wrasse was first formally described as Scarus purpureus in 1775 by the Swedish explorer, orientalist and naturalist Peter Forsskål (1732-1763) who gave the type locality as Jeddah. When William Swainson was describing the genus Thalassoma in 1839 he designated Scarus purpureus as its type species.
