= Lissocampus fatiloquus =

Prophet's pipefish

Conservation status
- Least Concern (IUCN 3.1)

Scientific classification
- Kingdom: Animalia
- Phylum: Chordata
- Class: Actinopterygii
- Division: Teleostei
- Order: Syngnathiformes
- Family: Syngnathidae
- Genus: Lissocampus
- Species: L. fatiloquus

Binomial name
- Lissocampus fatiloquus Whitley 1943

Species of fish

Lissocampus fatiloquus, also known as prophet's pipefish, is a species of marine fish belonging to the family Syngnathidae. The species has been noted in a variety of habitats including sargassum, seagrass beds and sandy substrates along the coast of Western Australia from Shark Bay to Rottnest Island. Their diet is thought to consist of small crustaceans such as copepods. Reproduction occurs through ovoviviparity in which the males brood eggs before giving live birth.
