= Discoveries in Australia =

1846 book by John Lort Stokes

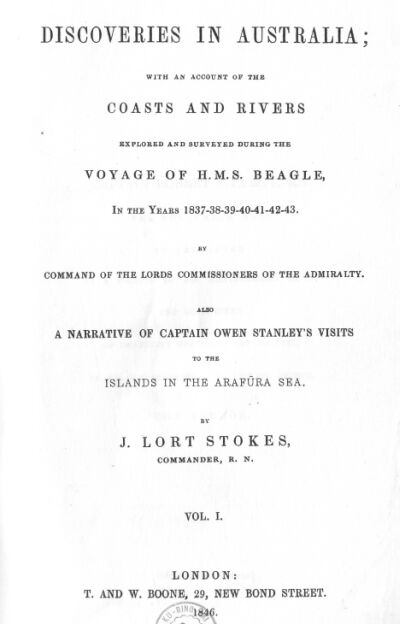
- Frontispiece, Volume 1
- Author: John Lort Stokes
- Language: English
- Publisher: T. and W. Boone
- Publication date: 1846
- Publication place: England
- Media type: Print

Discoveries in Australia; with an account of the coasts and rivers explored and surveyed during the voyage of H.M.S. Beagle, in the years 1837-38-39-40-41-42-43, by command of the Lords Commissioners of the Admiralty. Also a narrative of Captain Owen Stanley's visits to the islands in the Arafura Sea., widely known as Discoveries in Australia, is an 1846 two-volume work by John Lort Stokes. It comprises the edited journals of the explorations and surveys, both maritime and inland, of Stokes and other members of the crew of HMS Beagle, during a surveying expedition in Australia that lasted from 1837 to 1843. The work is of immense historical significance, as a great many places in Australia were discovered during the expedition, and the names and locations of these places were published for the first time in Discoveries in Australia.

Jonathon Wantrup describes Discoveries in Australia in the following terms:

Stokes is noted as an engaging, vivacious and entertaining writer. As the official account of the last major expedition of Australian discovery, his book is essential to a collection relating to coastal voyages. It is also of considerable interest to collectors of inland exploration journals, since Stokes and the crew of the Beagle undertook many expeditions inland from the coast which are recorded in his book [...].

== Selected publications ==
- Stokes, John Lort (1846). Discoveries in Australia: With an Account of the Coasts and Rivers Explored and Surveyed during the Voyage of H. M. S. Beagle, in the Years 1837-38-39-40-41-42-43. Also a Narrative of Captain Owen Stanley's Visits to the Islands in the Arafūra Sea. OL 232111W. Wikidata Q5281829.
  - Stokes, John Lort (1846). Discoveries in Australia: With an Account of the Coasts and Rivers Explored and Surveyed during the Voyage of H. M. S. Beagle, in the Years 1837-38-39-40-41-42-43. Also a Narrative of Captain Owen Stanley's Visits to the Islands in the Arafūra Sea. Vol. 1. London: T. and W. Boone. hdl:2027/yale.39002015419667. Wikidata Q133927698.
  - Stokes, John Lort (1846). Discoveries in Australia: With an Account of the Coasts and Rivers Explored and Surveyed during the Voyage of H. M. S. Beagle, in the Years 1837-38-39-40-41-42-43. Also a Narrative of Captain Owen Stanley's Visits to the Islands in the Arafūra Sea. Vol. 2. London: T. and W. Boone. hdl:2027/yale.39002015419675. Wikidata Q133927699.

== Sources ==
- Wantrup, Jonathon (1987). Australian Rare Books 1788–1900. Potts Point, New South Wales: Hordern House. ISBN 0958847827.
