= Namdaemun Market =

Traditional market in Seoul, South Korea

Coordinates: 37°33′34.00″N 126°58′38.70″E

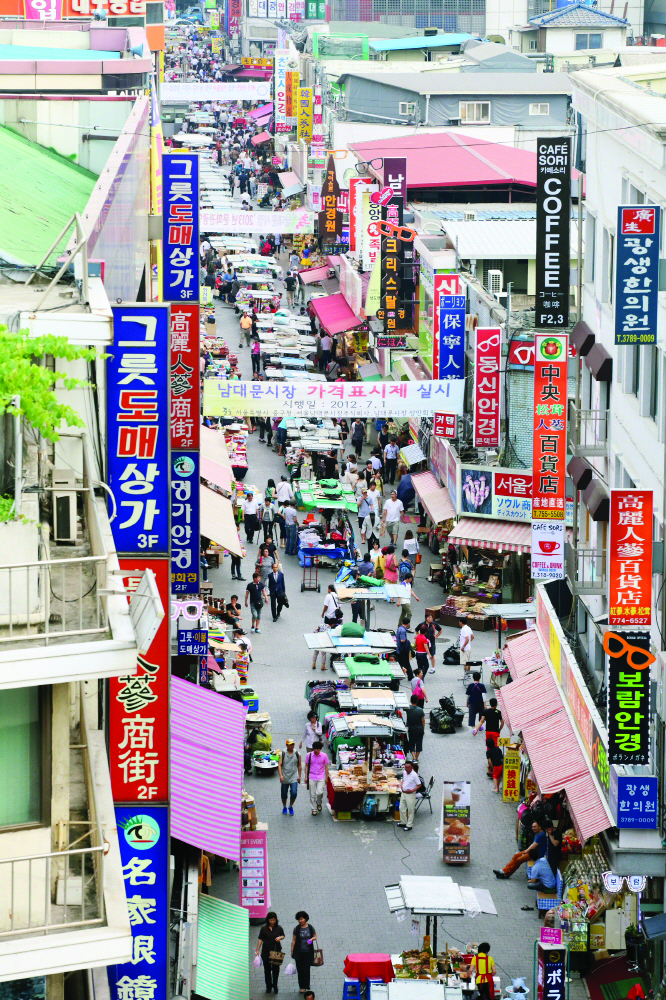
- View of the market from above (2013)
- Address: 21, Namdaemunsijang 4-gil, Jung District, Seoul, South Korea
- Num. of stores: 5,200
- Floor area: 64,612 m^{2} (695,480 ft^{2})
- Website: www.namdaemunmarket.co.kr/index.php (multiple languages)

Seoul Future Heritage
- Reference no.: 2013-046

Korean name
- Hangul: 남대문시장
- Hanja: 南大門市場
- RR: Namdaemun sijang
- MR: Namdaemun sijang

Namdaemun Market (Korean: 남대문시장; Hanja: 南大門市場) is a large traditional market in Seoul, South Korea. It is located next to Namdaemun, the main southern gate to the old city. The market is among the oldest extant markets in Korea, having opened during the Joseon period in 1414.

The market's character, location, and size have all changed over time. Amidst Joseon's isolationism in the 16th and 17th centuries, the market was limited to mostly Korean customers and merchants. This persisted until the Empire of Japan forcefully opened Korea in the Japan–Korea Treaty of 1876. Afterwards, nearly half of the merchants became either ethnic Chinese or Japanese merchants. During the 1910–1945 Japanese colonial period, the market survived a number of attempts by the Japanese colonial government to shut it down. The market was destroyed a number of times over time by accidental fires, including one during the 1950–1953 Korean War. Each time it was destroyed, it was rebuilt to roughly the same size and status it had previously operated under.

Today the market has been modernized, although it retains much of its bustling character. It is largely jointly owned by a collective of the merchants who operate within it. According to the Seoul Institute, it contained 5,200 stores, had 9,090 workers, and had an area of 64,612 m^{2} (695,480 ft^{2}) as of 2016.

== History ==
=== Creation of the market ===
In 1394, shortly after the establishment of the Joseon dynasty, King Taejo made Seoul the capital city. The government set about redesigning the city according to principles set out in the Chinese bureaucratic text Rites of Zhou. They managed to place buildings like the royal palace Gyeongbokgung and the altar Sajikdan according to the book. However, the book dictated that markets should be placed north of the royal palace. As there was not much space between the royal palace and the mountain just north of the palace, Bugaksan, they decided to place markets elsewhere.

A market roughly in the same area as the current Namdaemun Market finished construction in September 1414, during the reign of King Taejong. It was one of four market construction projects that occurred in the city between 1412 and 1414. A government-licensed shop that specialized in importing silks (선전; 縇廛; seonjeon) was the first to open in the market. Soon afterwards followed a large number of government-licensed shops (시전행랑; 市廛行廊; sijeon haengrang) that sold a variety of items, but mostly clothing, food, and household items.

=== Development ===
During the 1592–1598 Japanese invasions, 1627 Later Jin invasion, and the 1636 Qing invasion, activity in the market slowed. In the aftermath of these invasions, activity rapidly picked back up, as farmers fled from the countryside and sought opportunities in the capital. Around this time, the market became one of the three largest markets in the city. It mostly operated early in the mornings, so people could buy needed supplies for the day.

Joseon operated under a policy of isolationism after these invasions, and foreigners were relatively uncommon in the markets. However, after Japan forced Joseon to open its ports in the Japan–Korea Treaty of 1876, the number of international traders and shops rapidly increased. Chinese traders went from 99 in 1883 to 1,254 in 1893, Chinese-run shops went from 19 to 142, and 71 Japanese merchants in 1885 rose to 625 by 1890. Local merchants protested against this foreign competition, but nothing could be done.

Beginning in 1896, the Korean Empire (the successor to Joseon) government began efforts to rapidly modernize the country and Seoul. Due to numerous construction projects, a number of shops in the area were displaced, and by January 1897, a number of them moved into a building formerly used for distributing grain to the public (상평창; 常平倉; Sangpyeongchang; lit. 'Ever-normal Granary') and began selling there. This market is considered a clear predecessor to Namdaemun Market. In contrast to other previous markets, it operated throughout the day.

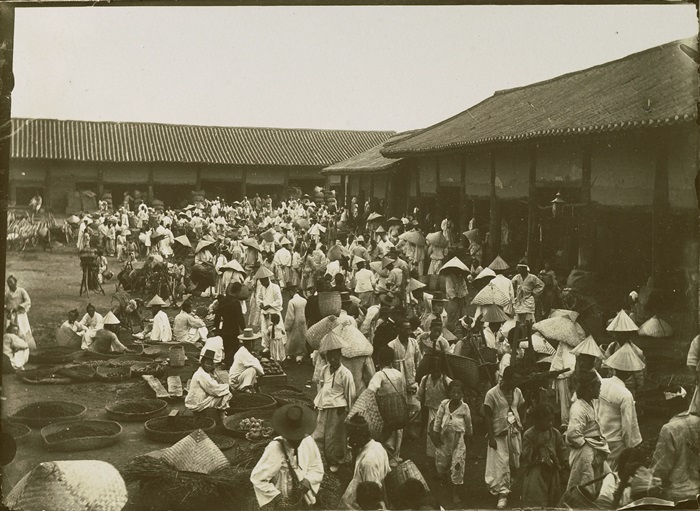
A photo of a predecessor to Namdaemun Market, taken around 1902–1903 by Italian diplomat to Korea Carlo Rossetti.

The markets inside the former granary did not pay taxes until 1899. Taxes were first collected by the Ministry of Agriculture, Commerce, and Industry, and then by the Office of Crown Property in 1901. By 1907, around 250 to 300 merchants operated inside the building. Roughly 50% were Korean, 30% Japanese, and 20% Chinese. According to 1909 research conducted by the Ministry of Finance, daily transactions amounted to 934,035 won.

=== Japanese colonial period ===
From 1910 to 1945, Korea was a colony of the Empire of Japan. In 1911, a significant fire destroyed much of the market. Despite this, the market was the largest in the city around this time, with a total sales volume of 2,181,600 Korean yen in 1916. This was around half of the total sales volume of all markets in the city.

In September 1914, the colonial government proclaimed General Ordinance No. 136, which set out policies for closing and regulating markets. Namdaemun Market was classified as a "Category 1" market, a traditional market that either needed to be developed into a "Category 2" or "Category 3" market or closed altogether. The colonial government attempted to establish a public wholesale market in Namdaemun Market's place, but failed to do so. The Joseon Agriculture Corporation, led by the pro-Japanese collaborator Song Byeong-jun, leased the land of the market for 15 years and invested 50,000 yen to build warehouses and buildings. He charged a 6 yen fee to merchants who wished to use the facilities: a price more expensive than the Korean Empire-era prices. As a result, the number of merchants dropped, but eventually recovered to 126 in 1921. However, a significant fire broke out in fall 1921, which destroyed all shops. Unable to recover from the loss, the Joseon Agriculture Corporation transferred its management of the market to the Jung-ang Trading Corporation, which was established on 12 April 1922, specifically to run the market.

By 1930, sales volume dropped, although the number of merchants in the market was stable at around 200. The drop in sales has been attributed to the economy's shift towards corporate capitalism. Sales of general merchandise also decreased, as modern Japanese-owned department stores opened in the area. In 1931, the colonial government sold ownership of the property to Jung-ang Trading Corporation altogether at a tenth of its market value. Shortly afterwards, Jung-ang raised fees for merchants by around 40%. Korean merchants organized into an association on 26 December 1933, to protest this.

In 1936, the market's name was changed to "Central Product Market" (중앙물산시장; 中央物産市場).

On 24 March 1938, the market's license expired, and the colonial government moved to replace it and Dongdaemun Market with a Gyeongseong Central Wholesale Market. Merchants again protested and organized, this time into the Gyeongseong Food Company. The colonial government implicitly allowed merchants to operate while the Gyeongseong Market was being constructed. After it opened on 1 April 1939, its impact was smaller than expected, so Namdaemun Market continued to thrive.

=== Liberation of Korea ===
After liberation in 1945, more than 200 merchants formed the Namdaemun Market Merchant Association and took over management. Initially, the United States Army Military Government in Korea, which governed the southern half of the peninsula at the time, classified the Association as "enemy property" (Japanese-owned). This was protested by the Association, which argued that 80% of shares were held by Koreans. The immediate outcome of this protest is not known, but by 1952, the Association managed the market.

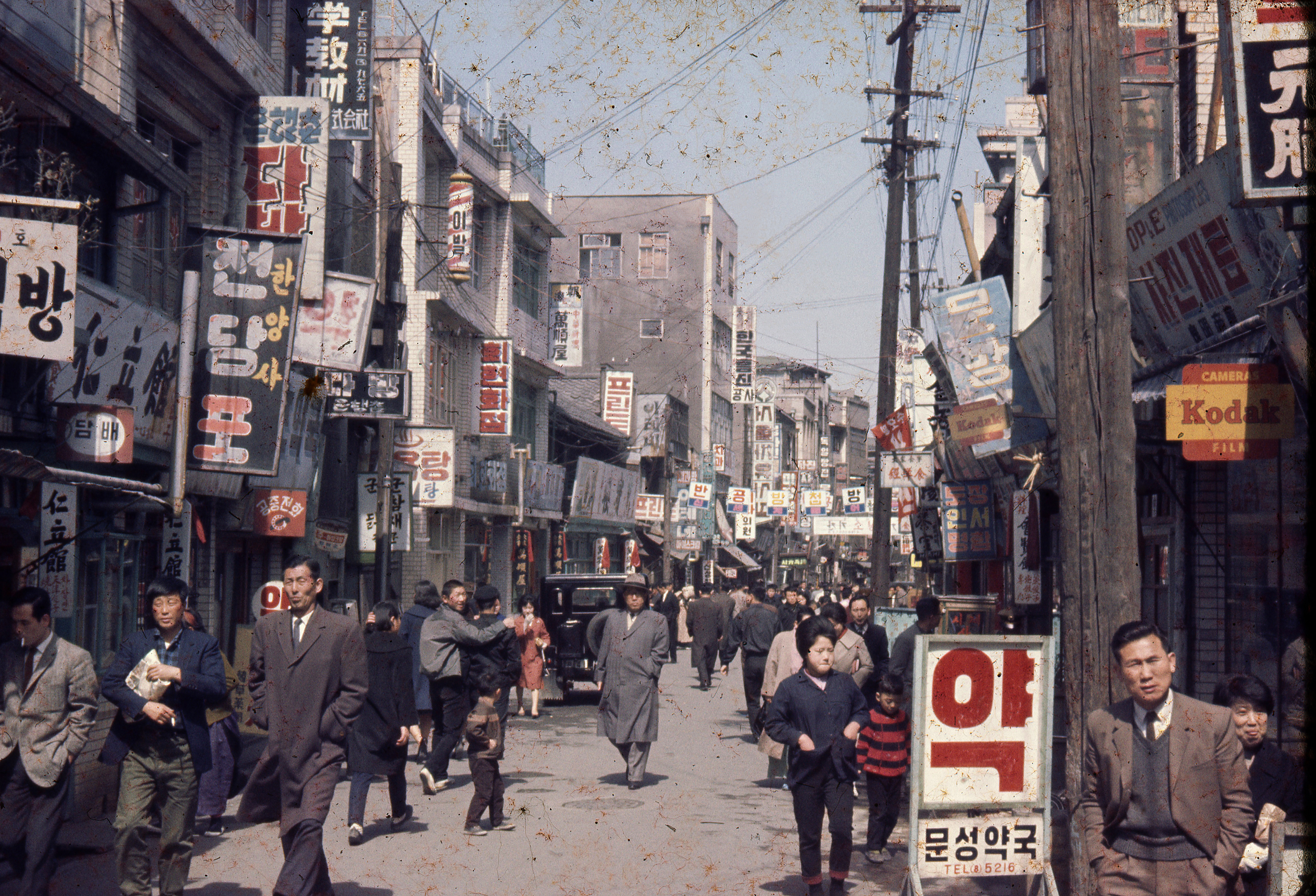
People walk the nearby street, Namdaemunno (1959)

In 1950, the Korean War began, and most of the 250 shops in the market were destroyed. When vendors returned to the market in June 1951, they found that the area had been cordoned off by barbed wire. Activities restarted with around 100 stalls and makeshift stores in the Bukchang-dong area. By 1953, 150 shops and 500 street stalls were in the market. In 1952, the market restarted the Namdaemun Market Merchant Association. Its president Um Bok-man, who was involved in organized crime, siphoned off funds from the market. He was removed from his position by the Seoul government in 1957, and replaced with Kim Woo-taek. At the time, it sold a large amount of contraband and military supplies from the U.S. military bases. Consequently, it was nicknamed "Dokkaebi Market", after a mischievous goblin-like creature from Korean folklore. Kkulkkuri-juk, an improvized dish that preceded the modern budae-jjigae, was sold in the market. The market also began to host numerous North Korean refugees; thus the nickname "Abai Market" (아바이시장) emerged, where abai refers to an old person in a North Korean dialect. The market suffered a significant fire in 1954. After which, many merchants relocated to Dongdaemun Market. By 1959, Namdaemun Market had lower business activity than Dongdaemun Market. In 1962, the market's license was revoked due to it not meeting the standards of the city. The license was reinstated in 1967, and it has remained in place until the present.

=== Redevelopment efforts ===
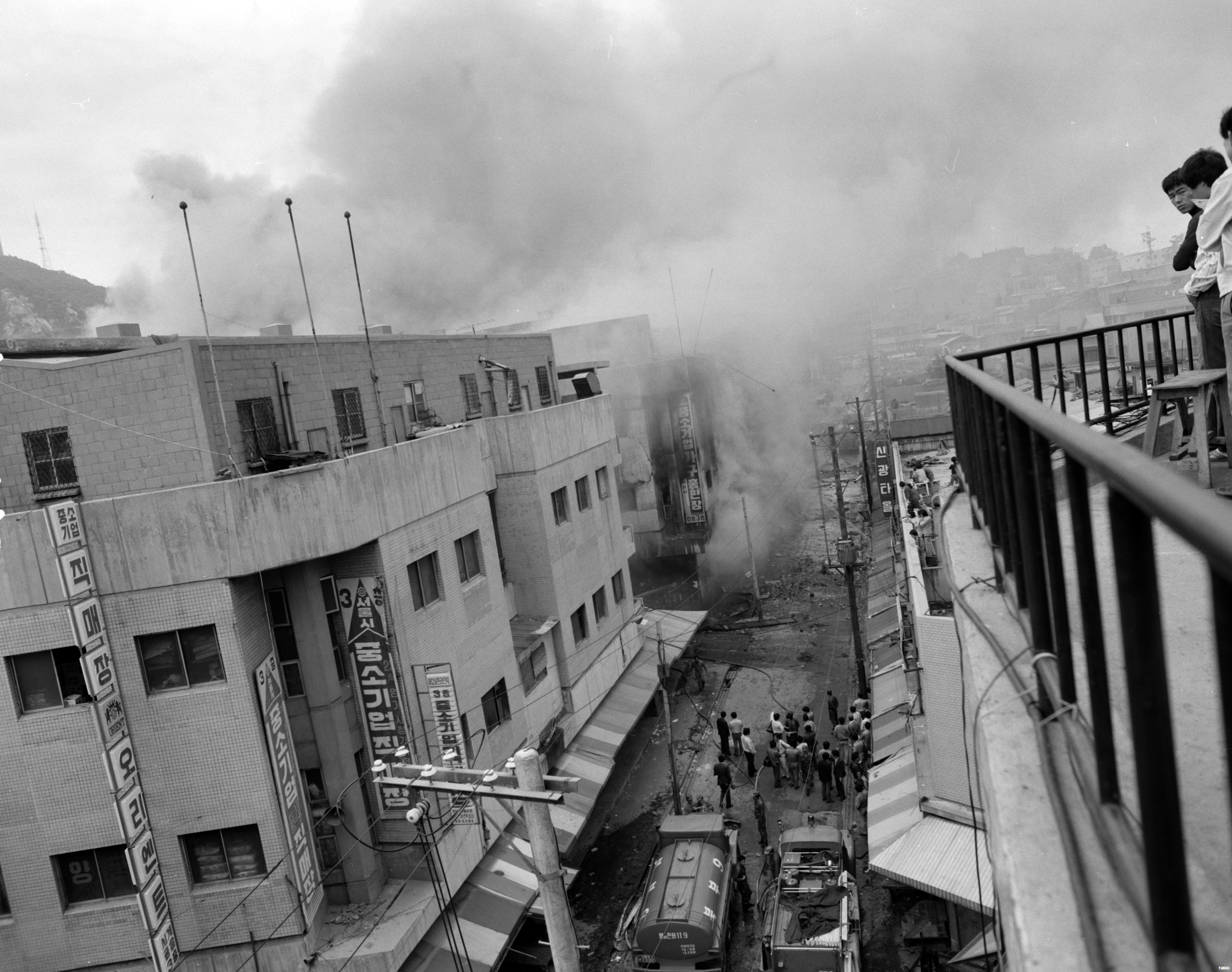
A fire at the market in 1977

In 1968, mayor of Seoul Kim Hyeon-ok proposed converting the market into an 18-story shopping complex. Shortly afterwards, a significant fire broke out in the market on 25 November 1968. Kim's plans were scaled down to just three floors. More buildings were then constructed over time, with three buildings opening in 1969, two in 1970, and one in 1971. Beginning in 1977, efforts were made to move the wholesale agricultural and marine products vendors to different markets. In the 1980s, efforts were made to make the market's goods more specialized. For example, one of its buildings began selling primarily textiles, clothes, and handicrafts. Specialization in those areas have since persisted.

However, redevelopment on the main building of the market stagnated, due to plans needing 80% approval from the building's occupants. In the mid-1990s, a proposal was forwarded to have the market transformed into 15-story buildings. Construction workers were hired, but in the end no changes were made. Redevelopment continued to stall, even by 2016.

=== Recent history ===
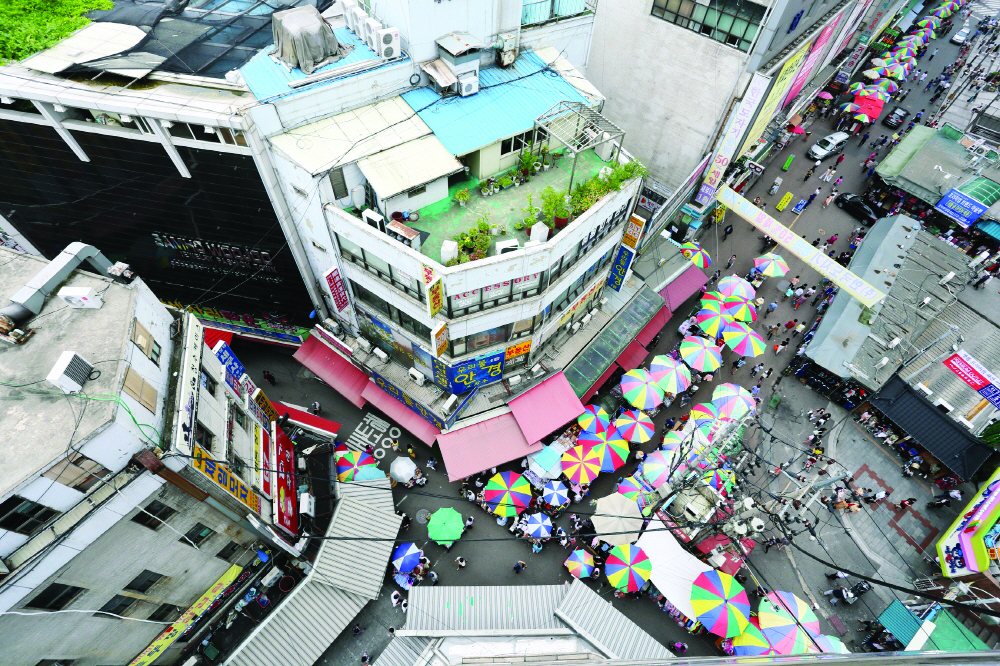
Looking down at the central area of the market (2013)

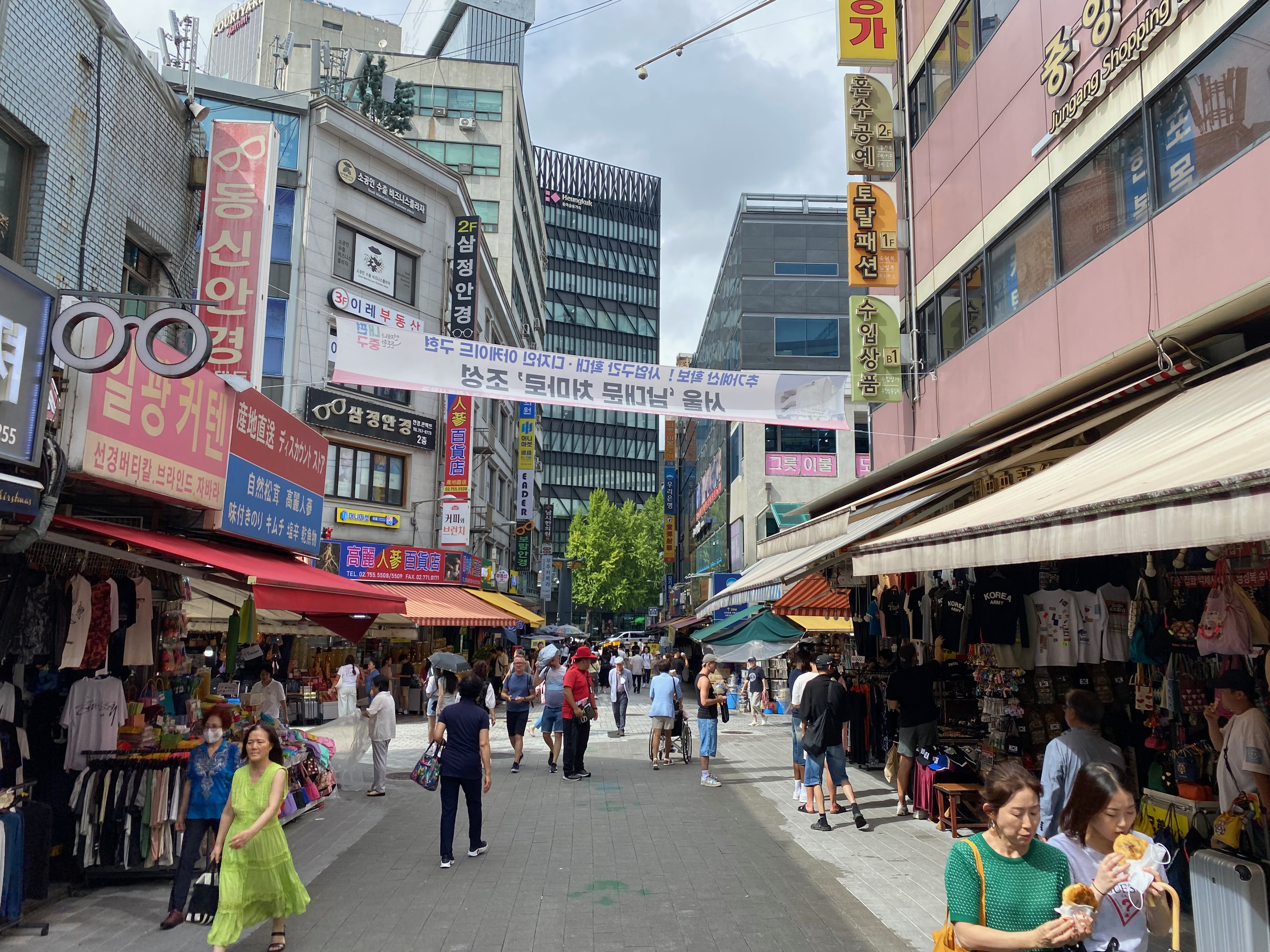
Shopping street in the market

In the 1990s, the market began shifting from wholesales to retail. However, overall market sales significantly dropped. This was due to a number of factors, including the 1997 Asian financial crisis, competition from Dongdaemun Market, and liberalization on import restricts (and thus more competition). Dongdaemun Market became more associated with younger shoppers, whereas Namdaemun Market appealed to older. Furthermore, the ownership structure of the market is reportedly complex, with stores sometimes belonging to five owners. Disagreements between these owners and across stores has reportedly hampered development.

The number of vendors increased from 4,205 in 1982 to 11,886 in 2013. The proportion of goods sold also changed; clothing went from 60% of the market's sales to 36.8%, and accessories went from 5% to 29.5%. Produce and fish sellers went from 5% to being virtually absent from the market during that time. Vendors also shifted from mainly manufacturing their own products to outsourcing production on contract.

The rise of the internet and online shopping has reportedly negatively impacted Namdaemun Market. Whereas Dongdaemun Market and its younger audience reportedly smoothly managed the transition to the internet, Namdaemun Market's older audience preferred to do their shopping in person.

The city of Seoul announced plans to renovate the market in 2007, with renovations continuing into 2010.

== Characteristics ==
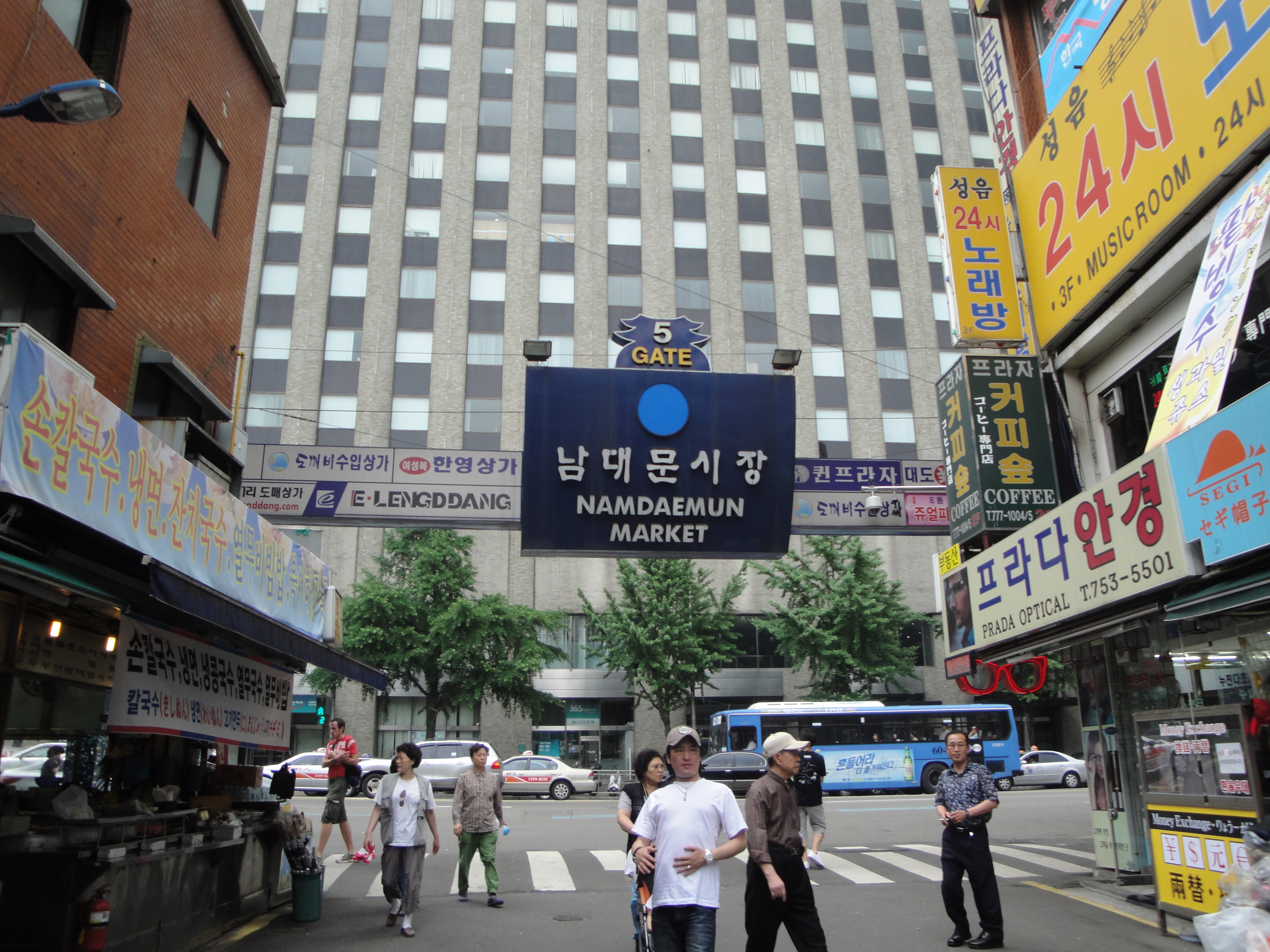
Market gate 5

In June 2013, the market had 11,886 shops. 3,501 sold accessories like earrings and hairpins, 3,475 sold clothing, and 909 sold children's clothes. Fashion shops accounted for 66.3% of the total. 973 stores (8.2%) sold kitchen products, handicrafts and local products. 913 were restaurants and health food shops, and 580 sold glasses, watches, and camera. Many of its stores are operated by a single person or family. Goods are typically transported within the market by motorcycle or handcart.

There are also numerous street stalls, with some operating by day and others by night.

Namdaemun Market Corporation buildings
Building
Building A
Building B
Building C (Central Shopping Mall)
Building D (Daedo Shopping Complex)
Building E (E-World)
Building F (Daedo Market)
Building G (Daedo Arcade)
Wing's Town
Queen Plaza
Yoseong Namdo Building

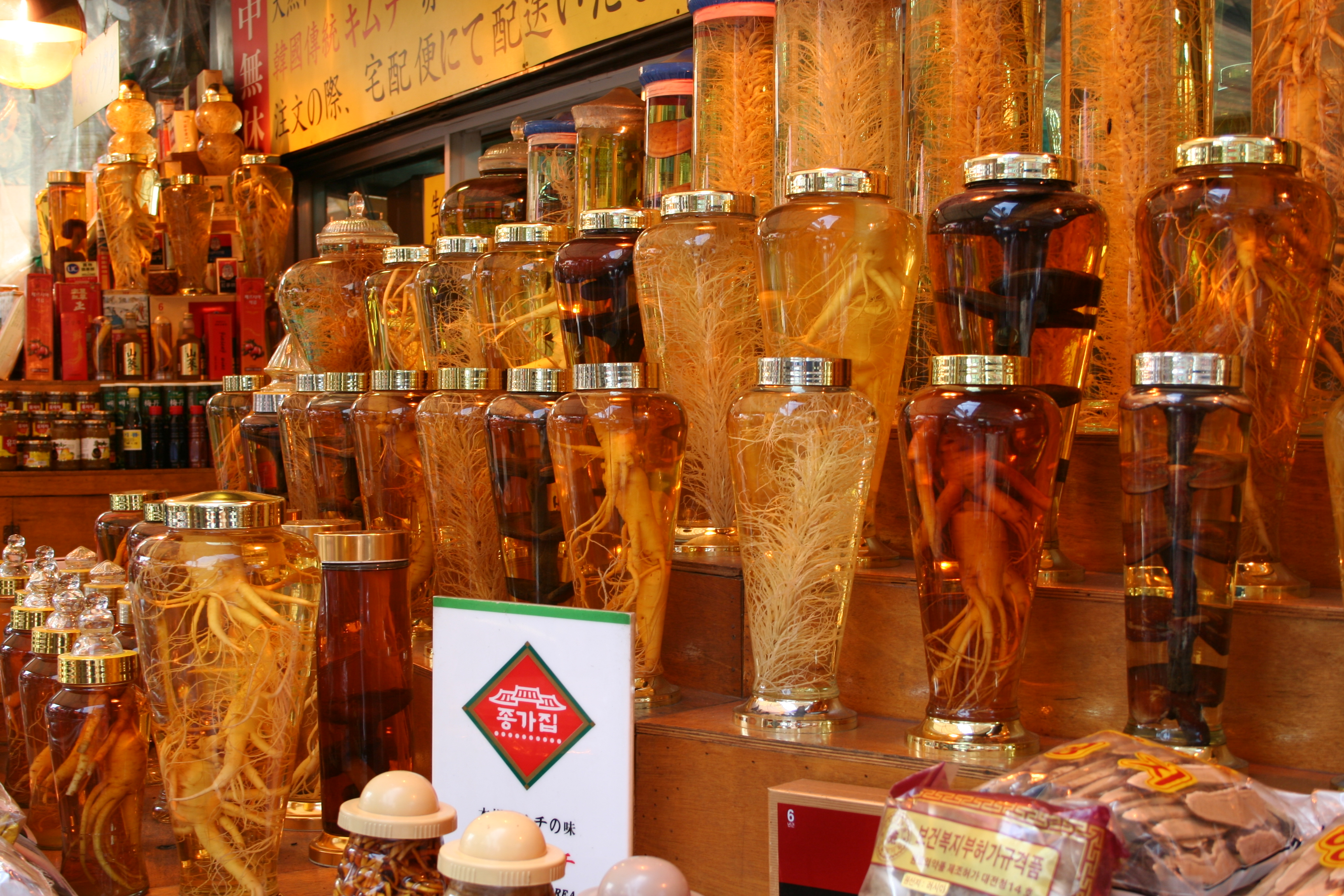
Ginseng shop

Buildings A and B (which are actually each composed of smaller buildings) are together known as the Main Building of the market, and are the oldest buildings in the market. They are in the location of the original granary building used for the market in the Joseon period.

How each building is managed reportedly differs. Generally, the exterior of the buildings, utilities, and exterior security are maintained by the building's jijuhoe (지주회; lit. 'landowners' assembly'). The jijuhoe collects upkeep fees from the various merchants. Their funds and activities are managed by a management office. The management office manages security inside the buildings and cleaning the interior.

The market is popular with tourists. It has signs in other languages in order to appeal to them, translators, and multilingual employees are reportedly valued. Health foods like ginseng are reportedly popular with Chinese tourists.

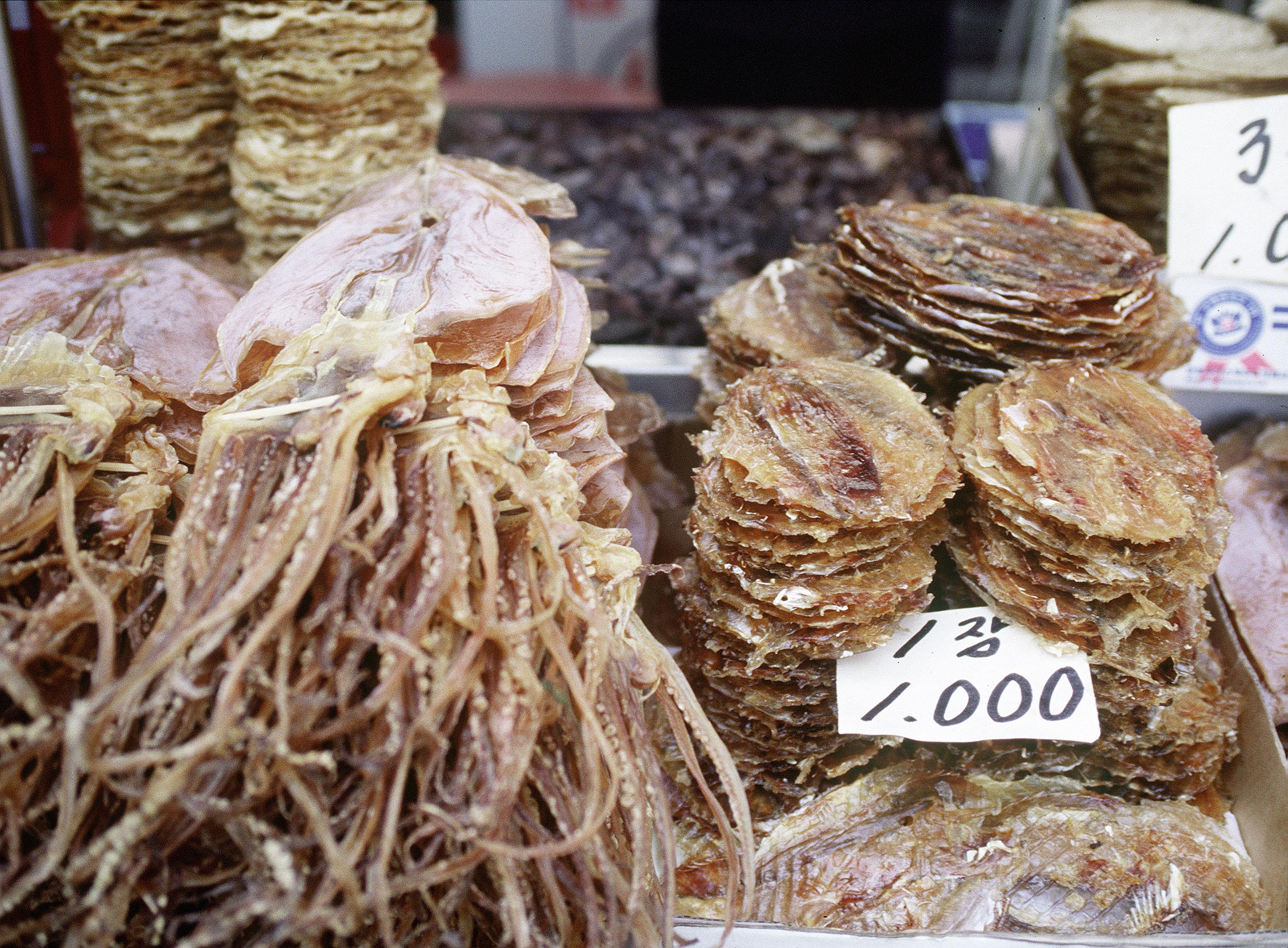
Dried squid and jwipo

There are a number of alleyways that specialize in certain dishes in the market. One alleyway, in building A, is for galchi-jorim, spicy braised cutlassfish. Another is for kal-guksu, a noodle dish. And a third is for hotteok, stuffed pancakes, including vegetables, nuts, and sweet condiments.

Within the borders of the market is a historic Japanese colonial-era building now called Ilchul Apartment (일출 아파트). Its Japanese name was Hinode (日出). It was primarily used as a short-term residence for people working nearby. After the Korean War, it came to be occupied by war refugees, who continued to live there afterwards. In recent years, few people live in the building; it has mostly come to be used by merchants in Namdaemun Market as office or storage space.

== See also ==
- Shopping in Seoul
- List of markets in South Korea
- List of South Korean tourist attractions
