= Mycobacterium stephanolepidis =

Scientific classification
- Domain: Bacteria
- Kingdom: Bacillati
- Phylum: Actinomycetota
- Class: Actinomycetia
- Order: Mycobacteriales
- Family: Mycobacteriaceae
- Genus: Mycobacterium
- Species: M. stephanolepidis

Binomial name
- Mycobacterium stephanolepidis Fukano et al. 2017

Species of bacterium

Mycobacterium stephanolepidis (type strain NJB0901 T) is an acid fast, rod-shaped bacteria that can form either round or smooth colonies, without pigmentation. The species name is derived from the fish that it was first discovered for infecting, Stephanolepis cirrhifer. This species grows on Middlebrook 7H11 agar or egg slants after being incubated for 3–5 days at 30 °C. Mycobacterium stephanolepidis has catalase activity and urease activity, intermediate for iron uptake. The organism fails to show Tween 80 hydrolysis, nitrate reduction, or arylsulfatase activity. It does not gro on Middlebrook 7H11 agar with picric acid. It has very little growth with 5% salt." M. stephanolepidis is "susceptible to clarithromycin, doxycycline, and ciprofloxacin." It displays either intermediate and/or resistant to the antibiotics rifampicin, streptomycin, kanamycin and amikacin.

Reports from 2009 stated that there was a high mortality rate among the thread-sail filefish, Stephanolepis cirrhifer, in a fish farm in Japan. DNA samples were collected and were analyzed, showing that this parasite was a novel species of the Mycobacterium, closely related to M. chelonae. These infections continued to be found in both farmed and wild populations of multiple species of fish.

The genome for M. stephanolepidis is about 4.9 Mb long and shares a 93.56% similarity between itself and M. chelonae. The chromosome has 64.0% G+C content. The GenBank contains the full sequence under the GenBank accession number AP018165.
