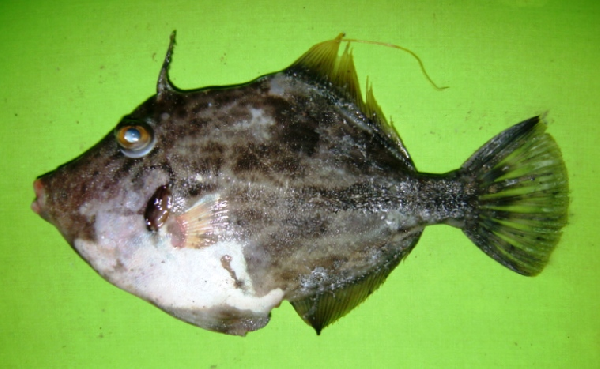

Conservation status
- Least Concern (IUCN 3.1)

Scientific classification
- Kingdom: Animalia
- Phylum: Chordata
- Class: Actinopterygii
- Order: Tetraodontiformes
- Family: Monacanthidae
- Genus: Stephanolepis
- Species: S. diaspros

Binomial name
- Stephanolepis diaspros (Fraser-Brunner, 1940)

Synonyms
- Stephanolepis ocheticus Fraser-Brunner, 1940; Stephanolepis weberi Fowler & Steinitz, 1956

= Stephanolepis diaspros =

Species of fish

Stephanolepis diaspros, commonly known as the reticulated filefish or the reticulated leatherjacket, is a species of bony fish, a ray-finned fish in the family Monacanthidae. Its natural range is the western Indian Ocean but it is also one of the species which has colonised the Mediterranean through the Suez Canal by Lessepsian migration from the Red Sea.

== Description ==
Stephanolepis diaspros has a deep laterally compressed body, becoming rounded in profile ventrally. The first dorsal fin has a single strong spine with barbs on the posterior edge, which originates immediately above the posterior margin of the orbit. The second dorsal fin lies directly above and parallel to the anal fin, the second ray of the second dorsal fin is very long and filamentous, especially in males. There is no pelvic fin, just a simple flap of skin. It has a pointed snout with a small terminal mouth which contains incisor like teeth. There is a slit like gill opening and sits above the origin of the pelvic fin, Its body is covered in rough skin, rough like that of a shark, in which there are tiny scales each with a fragile spinule. On the male the caudal peduncle has several rows of horny patches. The colour of the body is brownish green or greyish green with a complex pattern of spots, dark horizontal lines and sinuous lines. There are two dark bands on the convex caudal fin, separated by a pale band while the dorsal and anal fins are yellow to orange in colour. S. diapros grow s to a maximum length of 25 cm.

== Distribution ==
Stephanolepis diaspros occurs in the western Indian Ocean from the Red Sea south to the Horn of Africa, along the coasts of the Arabian Peninsula to the Persian Gulf. First recorded in the Mediterranean in 1927 off Palestine, it is now very common in the entire eastern Mediterranean basin and is expanding into the Adriatic.

== Biology ==
Stephanolepis diaspros is found in coastal waters with a rocky substrate, usually with vegetation, such as algal forests or seagrass meadows. It lives in small groups and feeds on small invertebrates by plucking them from rocks. It has been recorded from coastal lagoons and juveniles feed in open water over sandy and muddy sea beds. In Tunisian waters the breeding season extends from July to December and the fish first reach sexual maturity on reaching lengths of 9.5 cm for males and 8.5 cm for females.

The diet of Stephanolepis diaspros is varied, but is dominated by crustaceans and molluscs. Algae, echinoderms, coelenterates and fish remains were also found in the stomach contents of examined specimens while sponges, hydrozoans, foraminifera and Bryozoa were also preyed on. They feed with the greatest intensity in spring but this tails off in the summer spawning season.

== Economic impact ==
Stephanolepsis diaspros is not an important commercial species in the Mediterranean basin because of its relatively small size and, in some places, it is viewed as a pest to the fishery and any specimens caught are discarded. In the Gulf of Suez any specimens caught by fishermen were discarded up to the 1990s but it has become an important commercial species since the mid 1990s and there are indications that the stock is being overfished.

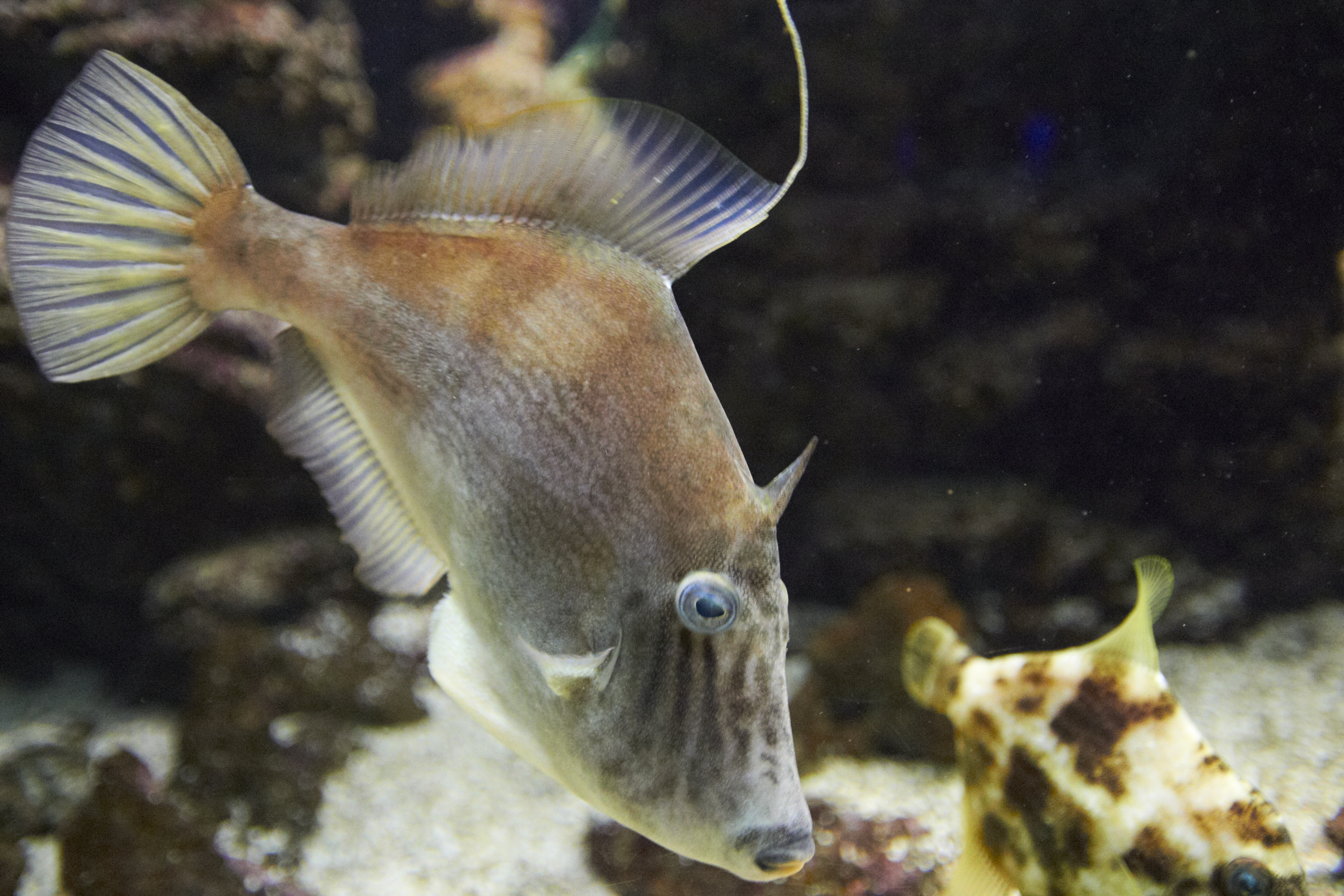
male off Crete

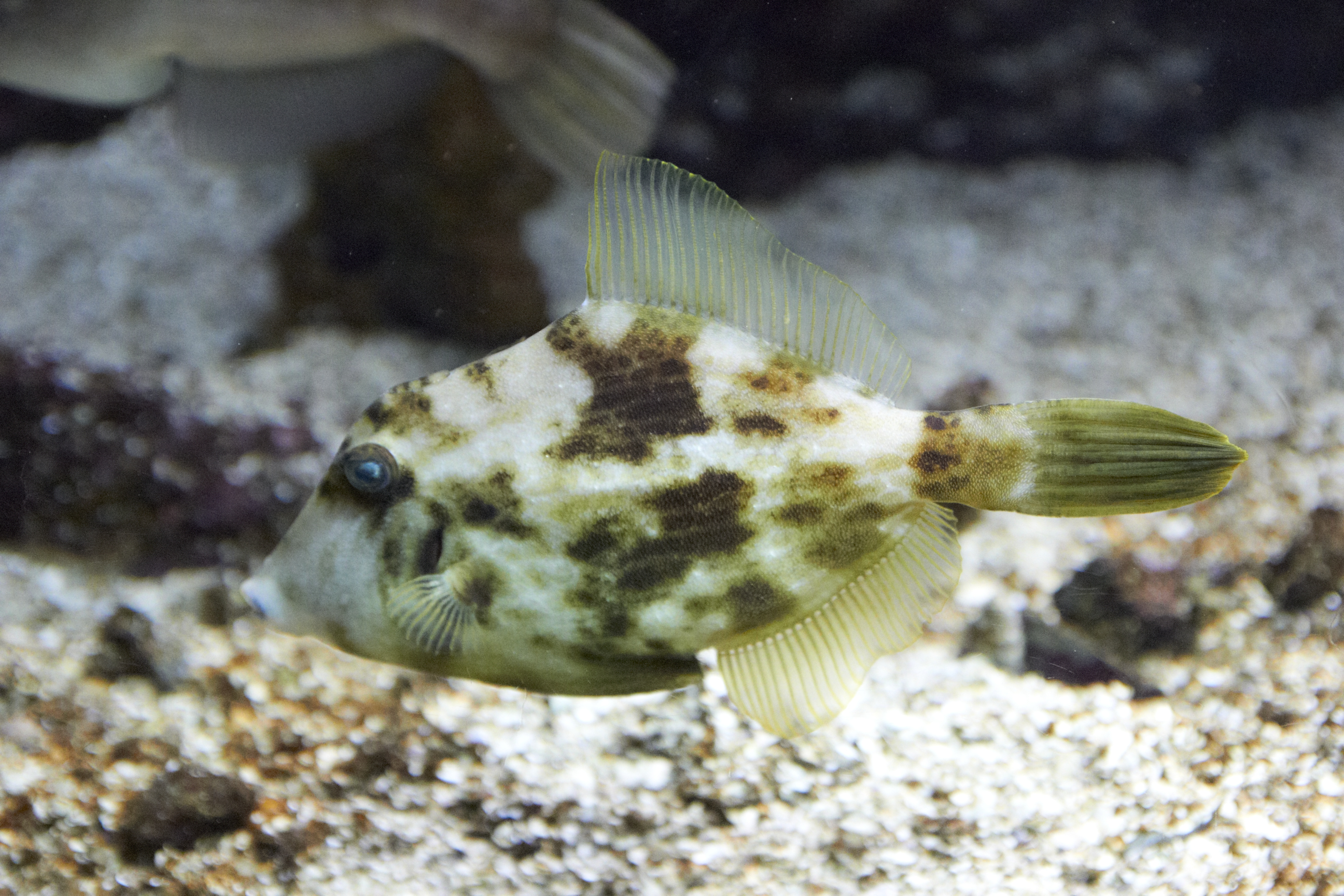
another off Crete
