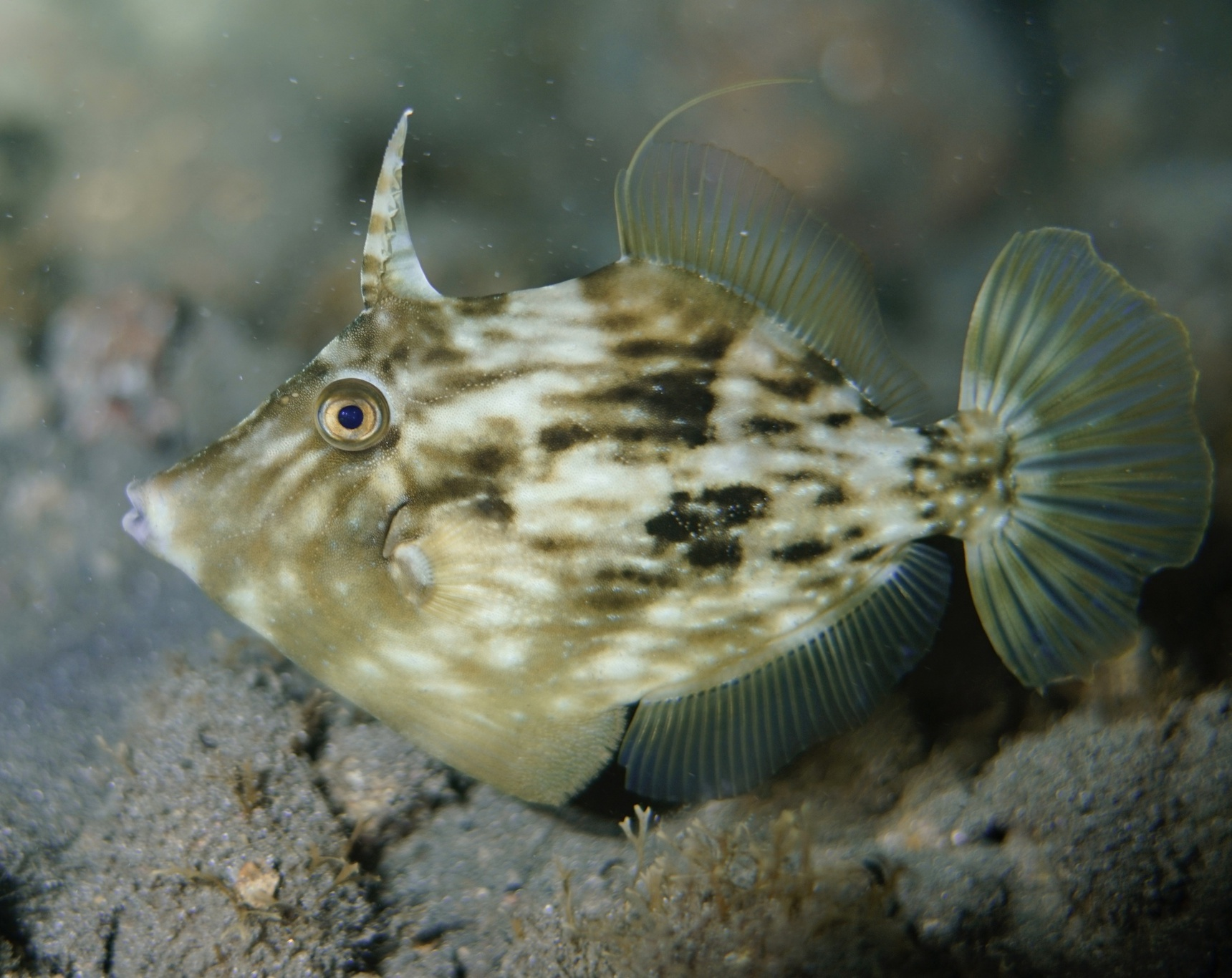
- Stephanolepis hispidus

Scientific classification
- Kingdom: Animalia
- Phylum: Chordata
- Class: Actinopterygii
- Order: Tetraodontiformes
- Family: Monacanthidae
- Genus: Stephanolepis; T. N. Gill, 1861

= Stephanolepis =

Genus of fishes

Stephanolepis is a genus of bony fish in the family Monacanthidae, the filefishes. Members of this genus are unusual-shaped fish and have a very rough skin, which gives them their common name. They are laterally flattened and deep-bodied, with long dorsal and anal fins and a fan-shaped tail. They have a mouth at the tip of the projecting snout and a long spine on the top of the head.

== Species ==
Five recognized species are placed in this genus:

Species	Common name	Image
Stephanolepis auratus (Castelnau, 1861)	porky	
Stephanolepis cirrhifer (Temminck & Schlegel, 1850)	threadsail filefish	
Stephanolepis diaspros Fraser-Brunner, 1940	reticulated leatherjacket	
Stephanolepis hispidus (Linnaeus, 1766)	planehead filefish	
Stephanolepis setifer (E. T. Bennett, 1831)	pygmy filefish	
