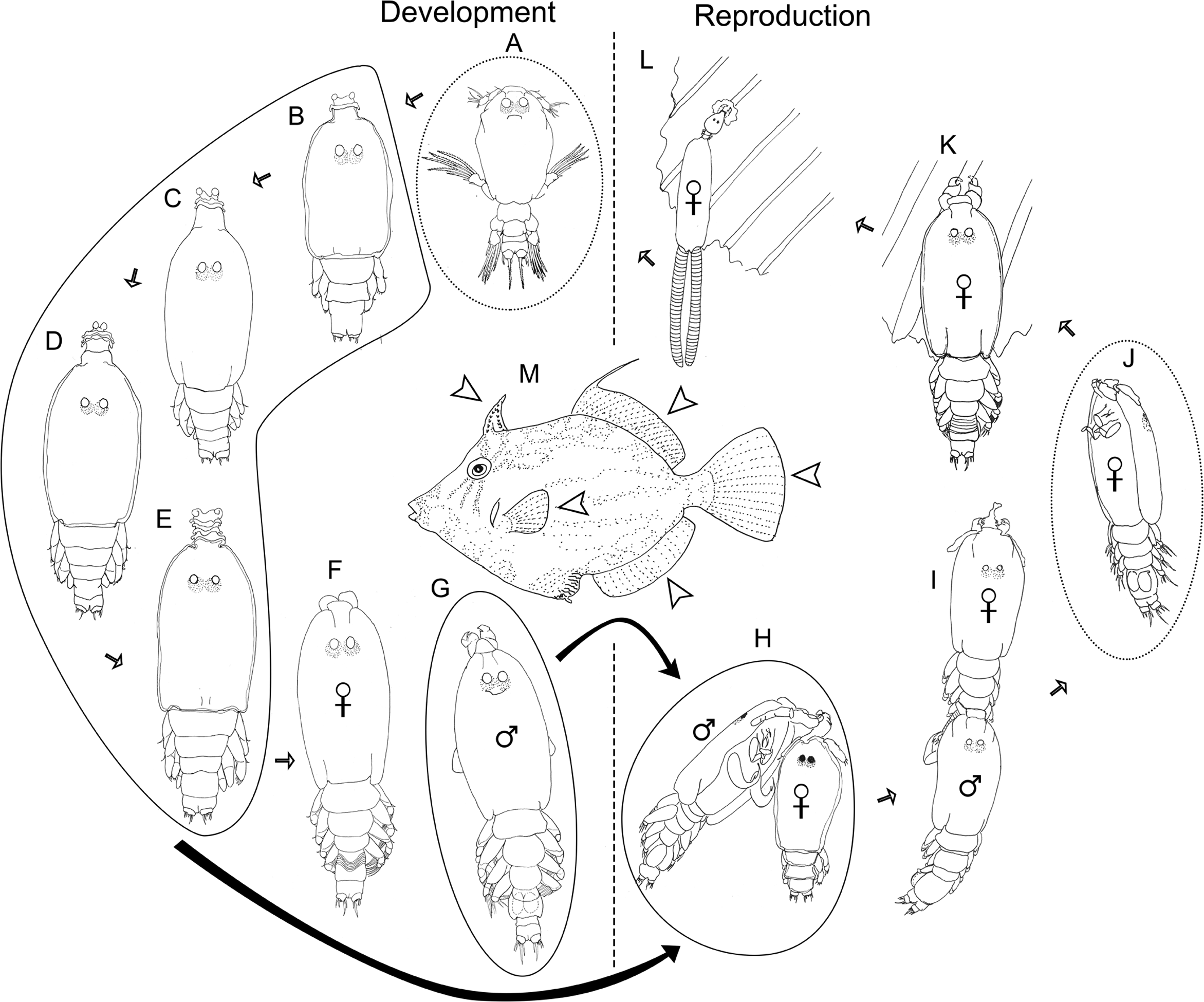

Scientific classification
- Kingdom: Animalia
- Phylum: Arthropoda
- Clade: Pancrustacea
- Class: Copepoda
- Order: Siphonostomatoida
- Family: Pennellidae
- Genus: Peniculus
- Species: P. minuticaudae

Binomial name
- Peniculus minuticaudae Shiino, 1956

= Peniculus minuticaudae =

Species of Maxillopoda

Peniculus minuticaudae is a species of parasitic pennellid copepod. It is known from the northeast Pacific Ocean. It was originally described in 1956, redescribed in 2012, and its complete life cycle has been elucidated on the cultured threadsail filefish, Stephanolepis cirrhifer in 2013.
