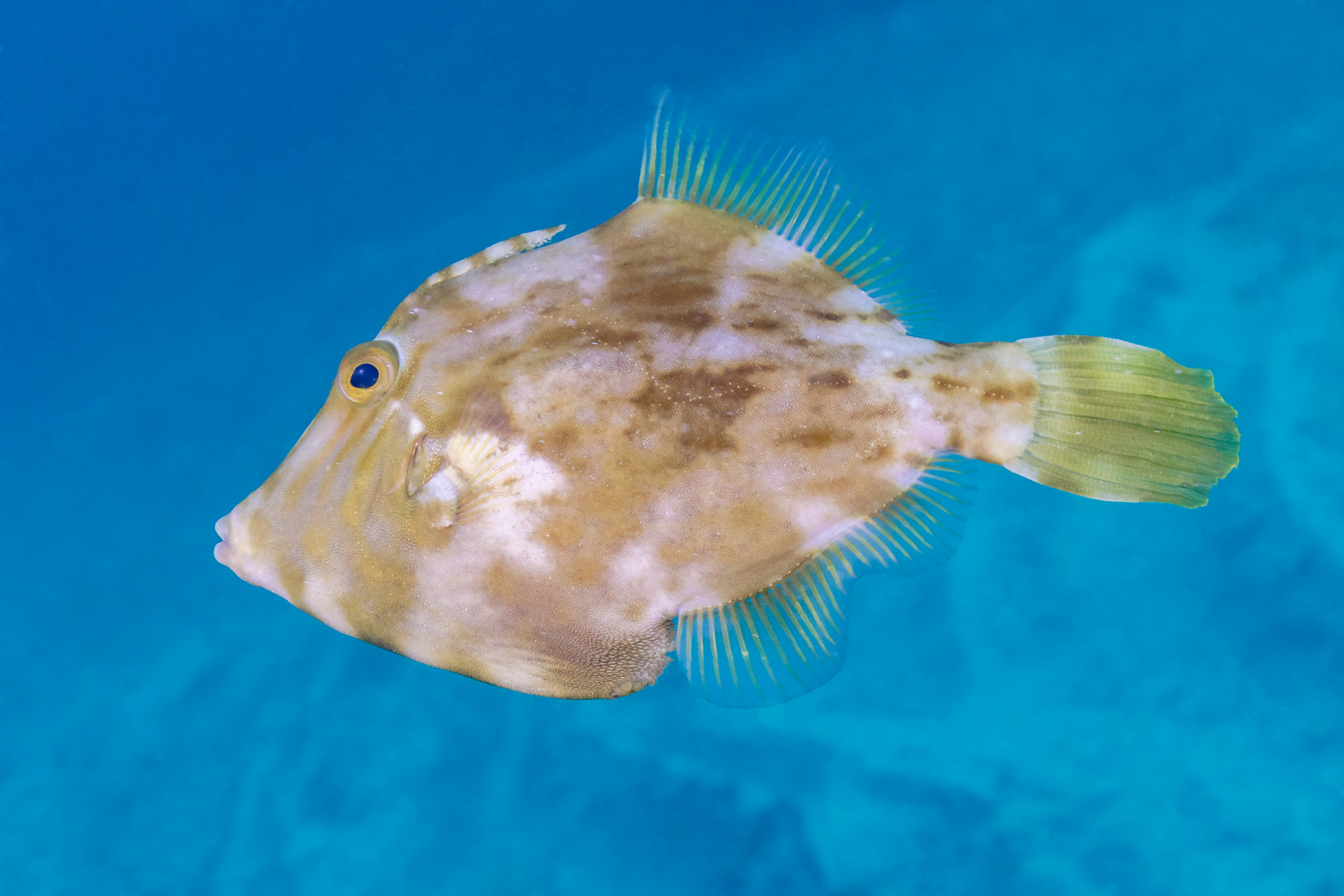

Conservation status
- Least Concern (IUCN 3.1)

Scientific classification
- Kingdom: Animalia
- Phylum: Chordata
- Class: Actinopterygii
- Division: Teleostei
- Order: Tetraodontiformes
- Family: Monacanthidae
- Genus: Stephanolepis
- Species: S. hispidus

Binomial name
- Stephanolepis hispidus (Linnaeus, 1766)

Synonyms
- List: Balistes hispidus Linnaeus, 1766; Monacanthus auriga Lowe, 1852; Monacanthus filamentosus Valenciennes, 1838; Monacanthus gallinula Valenciennes, 1843; Monacanthus hispidus (Linnaeus, 1766); Monacanthus oppositus Poey, 1860; Monacanthus setifer DeKay, 1842; Monacanthus spilonotus Cope, 1871; Monocanthus setifer DeKay, 1842; Stephanolepis hispida (Linnaeus, 1766)

= Stephanolepis hispidus =

Planehead filefish

Species of fish

Stephanolepis hispidus, the planehead filefish, is a species of bony fish in the family Monacanthidae.

== Description ==
Planehead filefish grow to a maximum length of 27 cm (11 in), but are more typically about 17 cm (6.7 in) long. Their colour is cryptic, being a more or less mottled pale brown, olive, or green on a light-coloured background, sometimes with darker brown splotches and streaks. The fish are laterally compressed and deep bodied. Their snout is elongated with a terminal mouth. The large yellow eyes are set high on the head and above is a prominent retractable spine. This is the anterior of the two spines associated with the long dorsal fin, which also has 29 to 35 soft rays. The anal fin has no spines and between 30 and 35 soft rays. Their pectoral fins are small and the tail fin is large and fan-shaped, often with two darker-coloured bands.

Planehead filefish are sexually dimorphic. In mature males, the second soft ray of the dorsal fin becomes greatly elongated and the scales on either side of the caudal peduncle develop into a patch of bristles. The elongated ray reaches between 104 and 128 mm. Females do not develop secondary sexual characteristics. They tend to have greater body depth than males, but variation in this trait exists in both sexes and overlap in measurements are recorded.

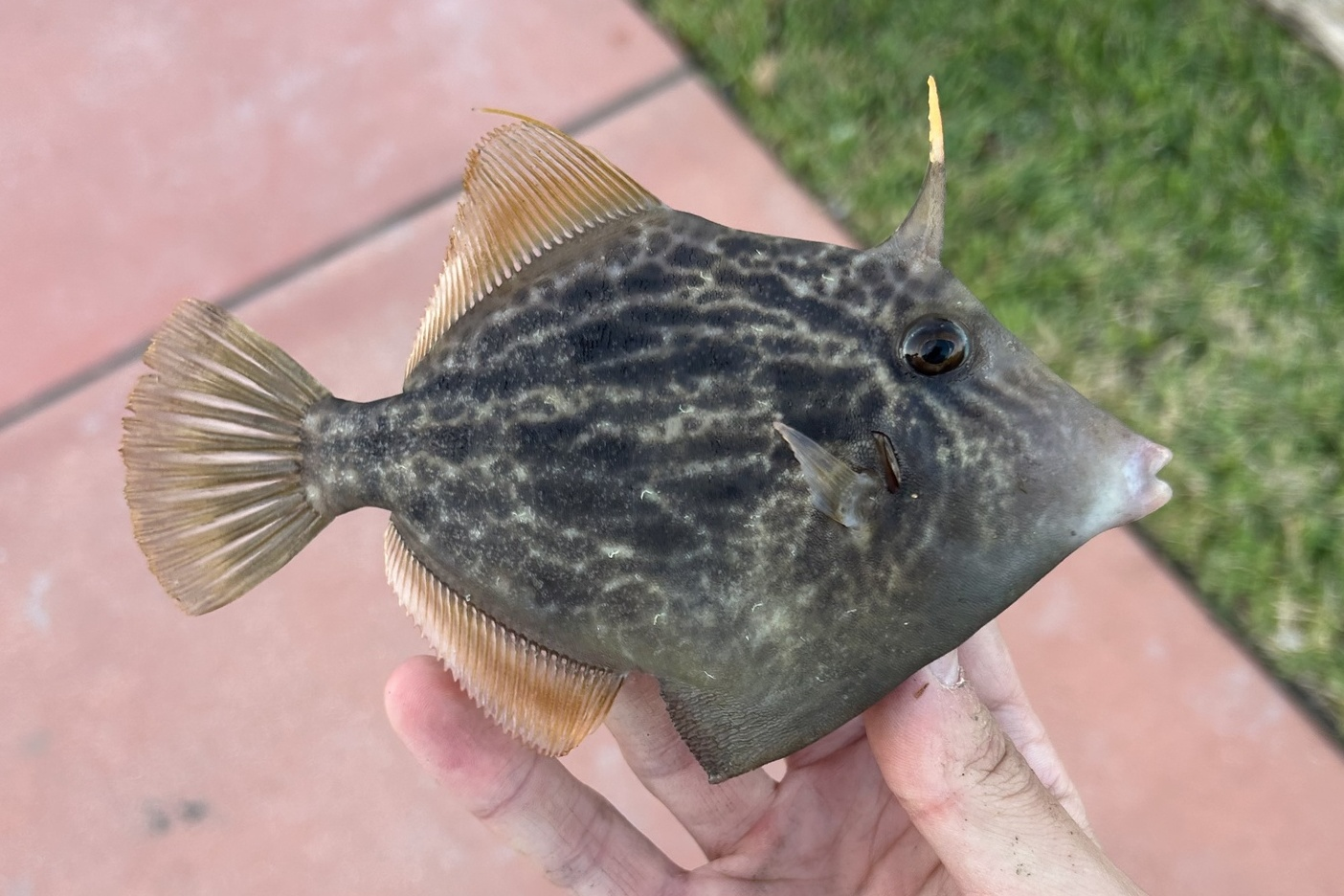
Adult

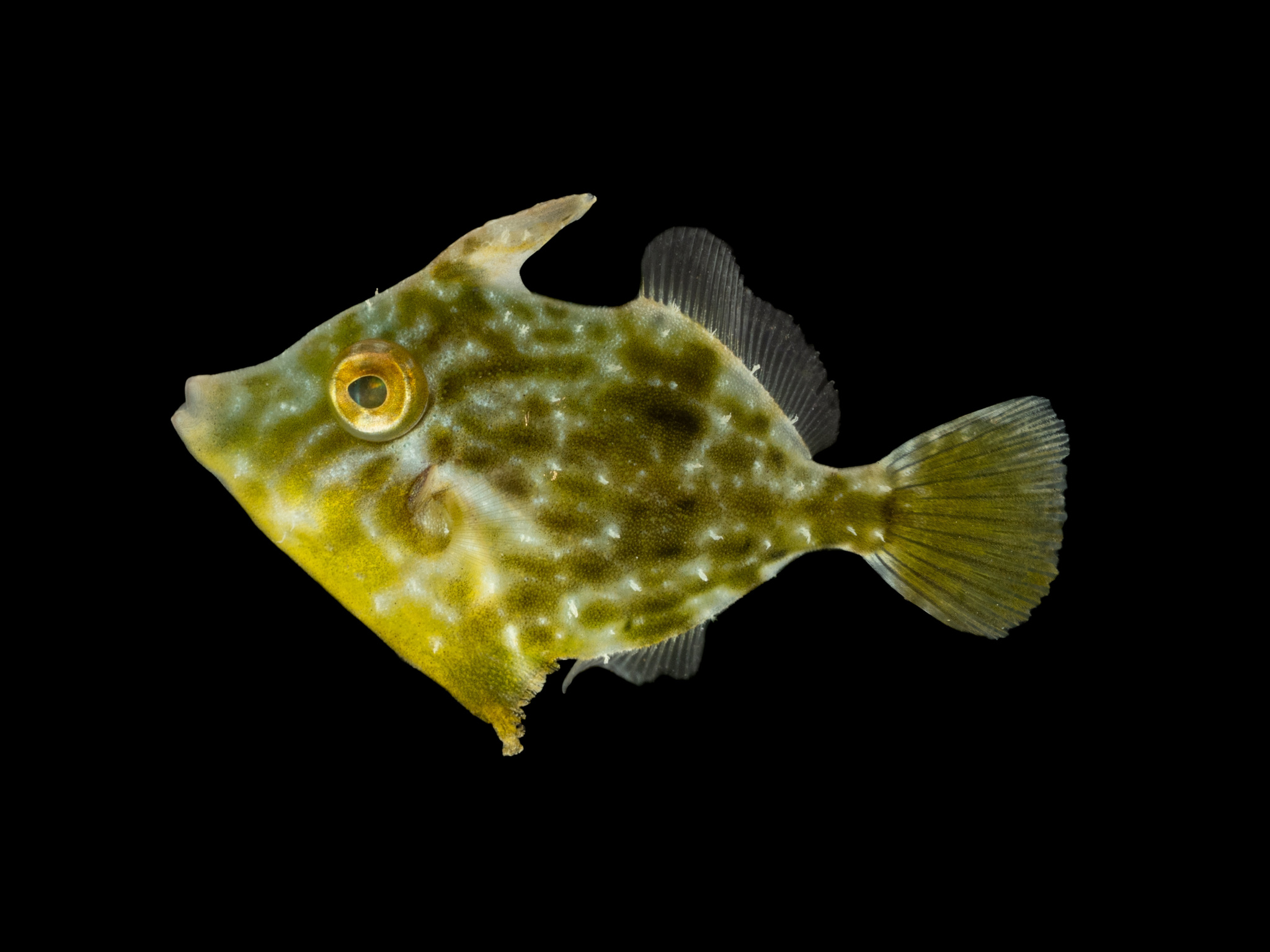
Juvenile

== Distribution and habitat ==
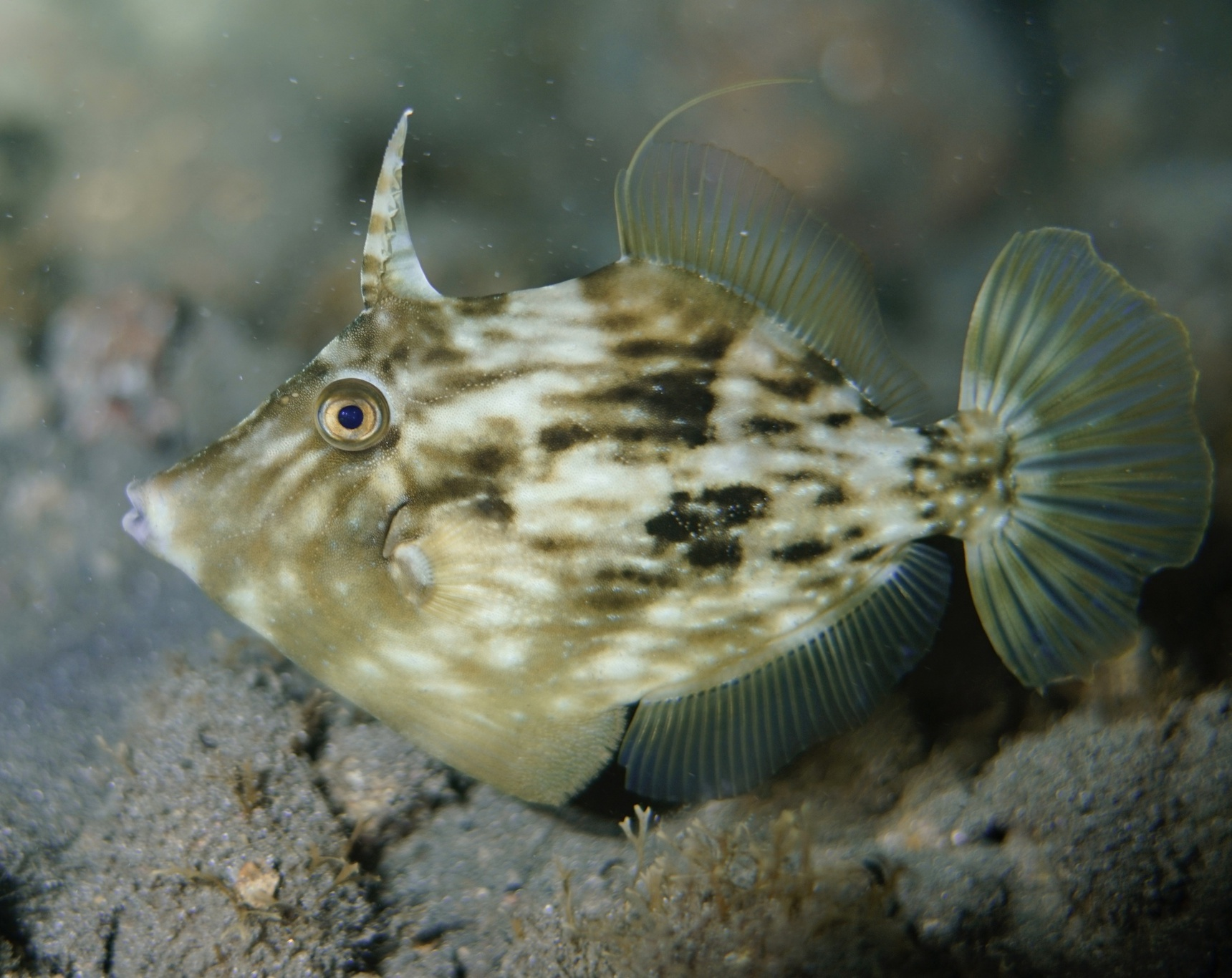
In Spain

The planehead filefish is found in the Atlantic Ocean at depths of up to 300 m (980 ft). Its range extends from Nova Scotia to Uruguay in the west and from the Canary Islands to Angola in the east. It is found near the seabed on reefs and over sandy and muddy sea floors. It is often found among Sargassum seaweed.

== Biology ==
In the Canary Islands, the growth and ageing of the planehead filefish have been studied. Spawning takes place in the summer and the age of the fish is established by using the fast and slow growth rings found in the anterior dorsal fin spine. The species has a lifespan of about three years and reaches half its final length by the end of its first year.

== Uses ==
The planehead filefish can be used for human consumption. In the Canary Islands, it is caught in fish traps and at one time was considered to be a by-catch, incidental to the capture of other, more desirable fish. Since the 1980s, though, it has become a target species in its own right and by 2000, concerns about overfishing had arisen.
