= Carlo Rossetti (diplomat) =

Italian diplomat to Korea (1876–1948)

Carlo Rossetti (1876–1948) was the second Italian consul to Korea, serving from November 1902 to May 1903. Before being posted to the consulate in Seoul, he was a lieutenant in the Italian Royal Navy. While in Korea, he took photographs of Korean people in various capacities, the first such produced by a Westerner according to Lucio Izzo, director of the Italian Cultural Institute. Upon his return to Italy in 1904, he wrote and talked about his time in Korea.

== Publications by Rossetti ==
- Corea e coreani : impressioni e ricerche sull'impero del Gran Han. Bergamo : Istituto d'arti grafiche, 1904-1905
- Lettere dalla Corea : Cenni sulle istituzioni ed i commerci di quell'impero / Canavis (Carlo Rossetti) Livorno : R. Giusti, 1904
