= Jwipo =

Traditional Korean fish jerky

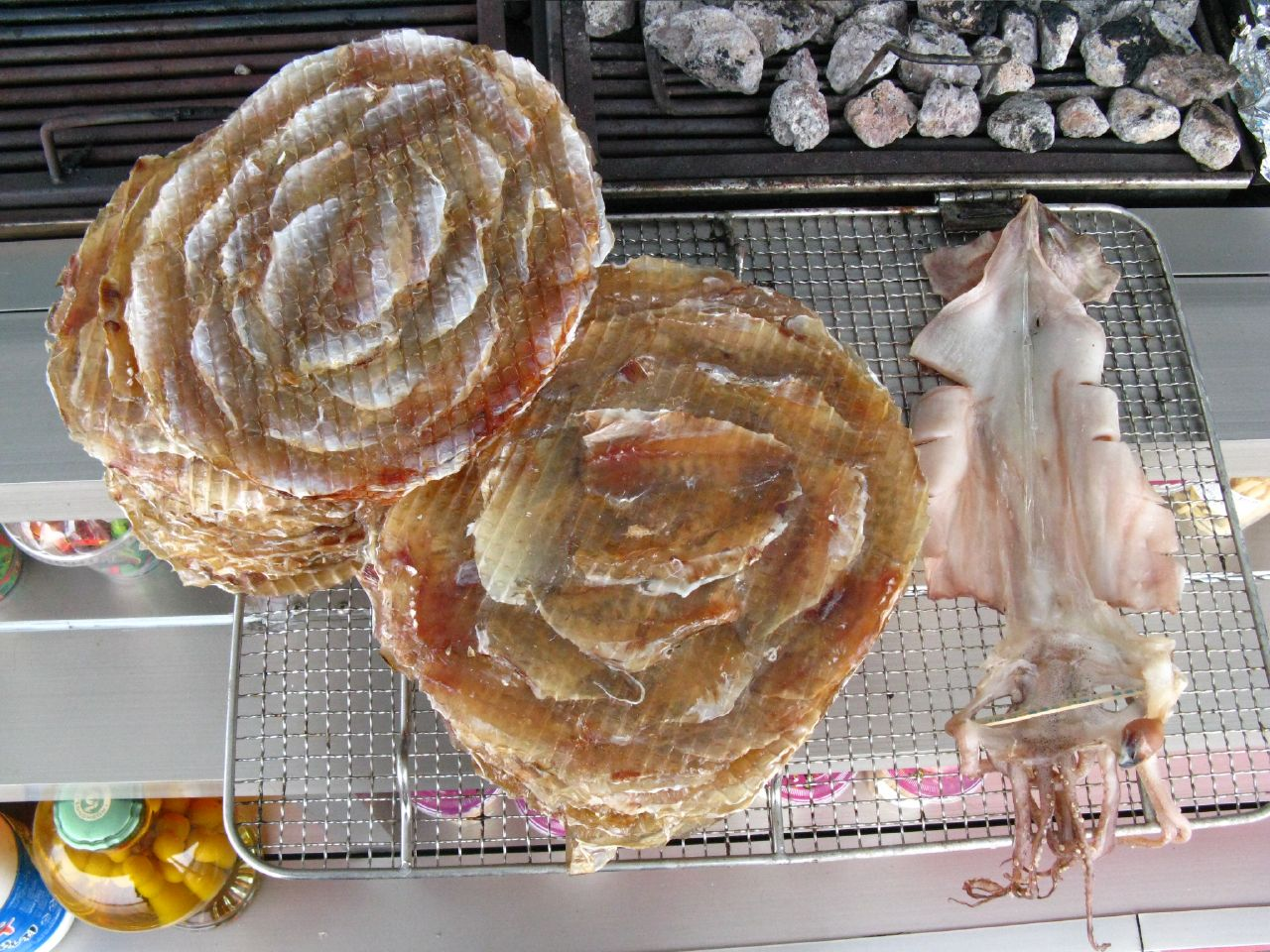
- Jwipo (two objects on the left) and grilled squid (right)

Korean name
- Hangul: 쥐포
- Hanja: 쥐脯
- RR: jwipo
- MR: chwip'o

Jwipo (Korean: 쥐포) is a traditional Korean pressed fish jerky sold as a street snack. Made from the filefish (in Korean, jwichi), it is seasoned, flattened, and dried. Jwichi meat has a subtle sweet flavor, but jwipo's sweetness comes from added sugar. It is traditionally served hot, heated on a burner until it curls.

== Making process ==
Jwipo is made from various species of filefish, such as Thamnaconus modestus or Stephanolepis cirrhifer. First the fish is skinned and filleted, and after washing, the fillets are seasoned, by soaking in a sugar and seasoning solution, or by mixing or tumbling the fillets together with the seasoning. Then they are shaped and arranged on a drying rack. The jwipo can be shaped free-form, or with the help of templates. After being shaped, the jwipo is dried at low temperatures.

== Consumption ==
Jwipo can be roasted or grilled, or eaten uncooked. Gochujang or mayonnaise can be used as a dip.

Jwipo can become an ingredient in banchan such as jwipo jorim: jwipo braised in a gochujang-based sauce.

== See also ==
- List of dried foods
