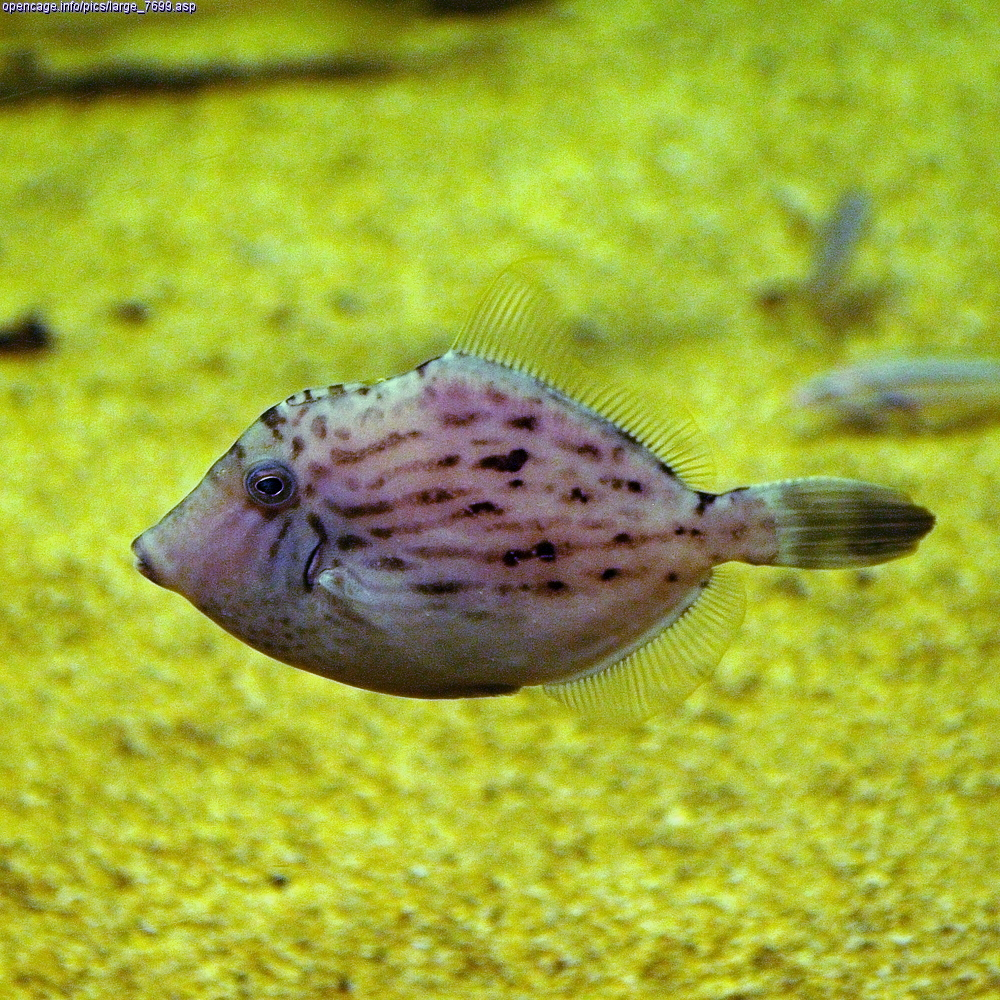
- Stephanolepis cirrhifer

Conservation status
- Least Concern (IUCN 3.1)

Scientific classification
- Kingdom: Animalia
- Phylum: Chordata
- Class: Actinopterygii
- Division: Teleostei
- Order: Tetraodontiformes
- Family: Monacanthidae
- Genus: Stephanolepis
- Species: S. cirrhifer

Binomial name
- Stephanolepis cirrhifer (Temminck & Schlegel, 1850)

Synonyms
- Monacanthus cirrhifer Temminck & Schlegel, 1850

= Stephanolepis cirrhifer =

Species of fish

Stephanolepis cirrhifer, commonly known as the thread-sail filefish, is a species of marine fish in the family Monacanthidae. It is found in the western Pacific, in an area that ranges from northern Japan to the East China Sea, to Korea. The fish grows to a maximum length of about 12 inches (30 centimetres), and consumes both plant material and small marine organisms like skeleton shrimp. S. cirrhifer is host of the parasite Peniculus minuticaudae. Some minor genetic differentiation between S. cirrhifer born in the wild and those bred in a hatchery for consumer use has been shown. The fish is edible and sold commercially for culinary purposes in many Asian countries.

== Names ==
In Japan, it is known as kawahagi (カワハギ, 皮剥). In Korea, it is known as jwichi (쥐치). In Russian, it is called "small striped triggerfish" (Спинорог малый полосатый). Other English names include "file fish", "fool fish", and "porky".

== Taxonomy ==
The fish was first described in 1850 by Coenraad Jacob Temminck and Hermann Schlegel, when it was observed along with other fauna off the coasts of Japan. They initially placed it in the genus Monacanthus, as Monacanthus cirrhifer; however, it was transferred to the genus Stephanolepis by David Starr Jordan and Henry Weed Fowler in 1903.

The species name derives from the Latin word cirrhifer, which means "bearing fringes of hair".

== Description ==
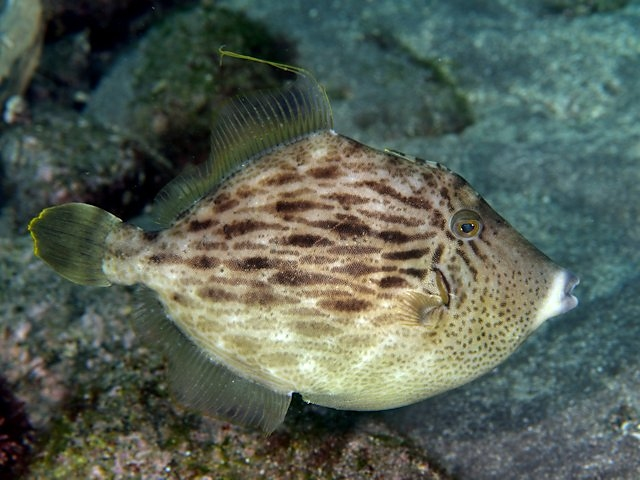
Male

Thread-sail filefish grow to a maximum adult length of about 30 centimetres (12 inches). The first dorsal fin is a strong retractable (folding backwards) spine. The second dorsal fin and anal fin are soft. They have comparatively small pectoral fins and truncated, fan-shaped tail fins. The dorsal and anal fins are colorless. Their second dorsal, anal and caudal fins rounded. In males, 1-3 soft dorsal fin rays extended as filaments; the first ray has a particularly long thread. The fish have a small abdominal spike. The fish are colored from light brown, to grayish- to light greenish-beige, and are slightly patterned with irregular, broken stripes that range from medium brown to blackish.

== Habitat ==
Juveniles of the species usually seek shelter and safety from predators within clusters of drifting seaweed. The adult thread-sail filefish usually reside near the seabed, where the depth is around 10 metres (33 feet). The fish migrate wholly in ocean waters ("oceanodromous") between their feeding and spawning grounds, which can cover a range of over 100 kilometres (62 miles). The spawning season lasts from May to August. Juveniles under 5 centimetres (2.0 inches) inhabit shallow water and feed on small crustaceans, mollusks and algae. Adult fish are mostly solitary and live among the coral and seaweeds.

== Ecology ==
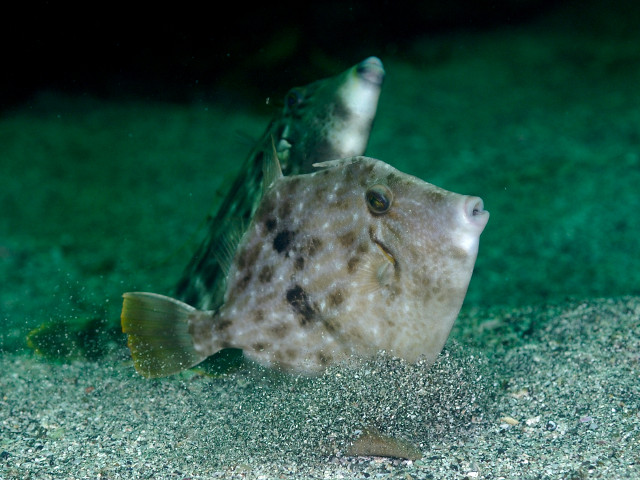
Spawning

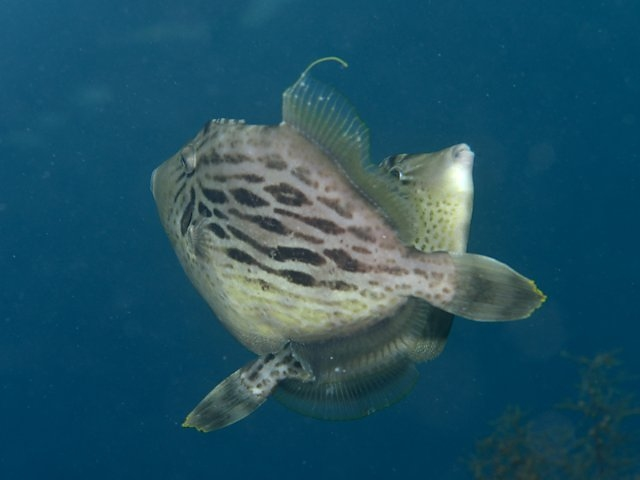
Males fighting

The thread-sail filefish is an omnivore, and can feed on plant or animal matter. Its diet includes kelp, but consists mainly of amphipods such as gammarids and skeleton shrimp, as well as the seagrass species Zostera marina. The fish also feeds upon smaller organisms, including bryozoans and some species of serpulid tube worms.

Thread-sail filefish feed on fish, amphipods, isopods, cirripeds, polychaetes, pelecypods, seaweeds such as those of the genus Sargassum; and gelatinous plankton, such as the moon jellyfish Aurelia sp. and the giant jellyfish Nemopilema nomurai.

S. cirrhifer is host of the pennellid copepod parasite Peniculus minuticaudae, which mostly infects the fins of the female fish.

== Uses ==
The thread-sail filefish is cultured and sold commercially as food in Asian countries, including Korea and Japan. In Korea it is used as an ingredient for jwipo. The demand for the fish in Korea is very high, and fisheries often employ the services of fish hatcheries for breeding more of the fish to supplement and enhance the supply of stock. This has been done to such a degree that as many as 95 alleles have been found to be unique to one of the populations, resulting from minor variations in certain genes that occur exclusively within either population; genetic differentiation between S. cirrhifer born in the wild and those bred in a hatchery has apparently occurred.

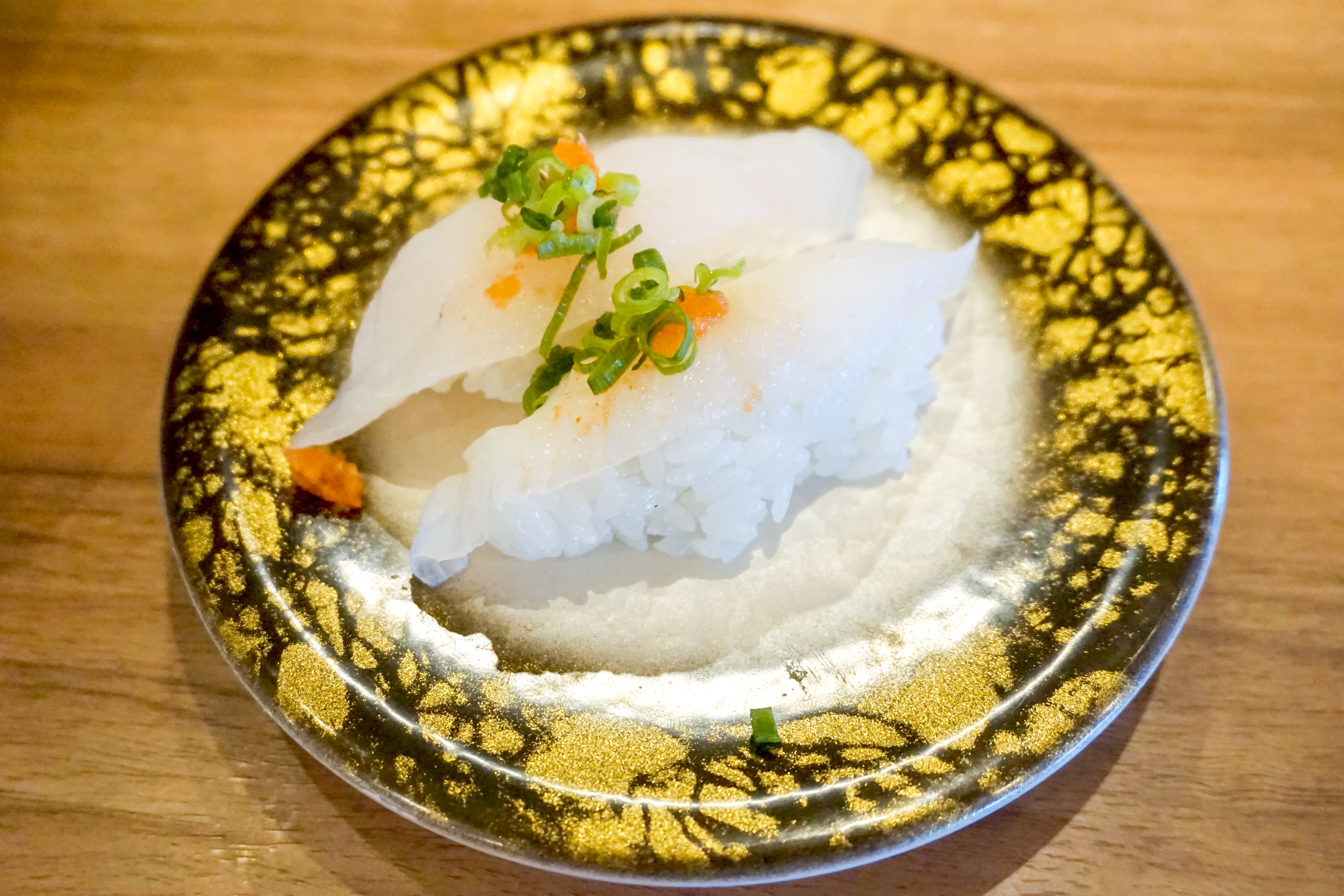
As sushi

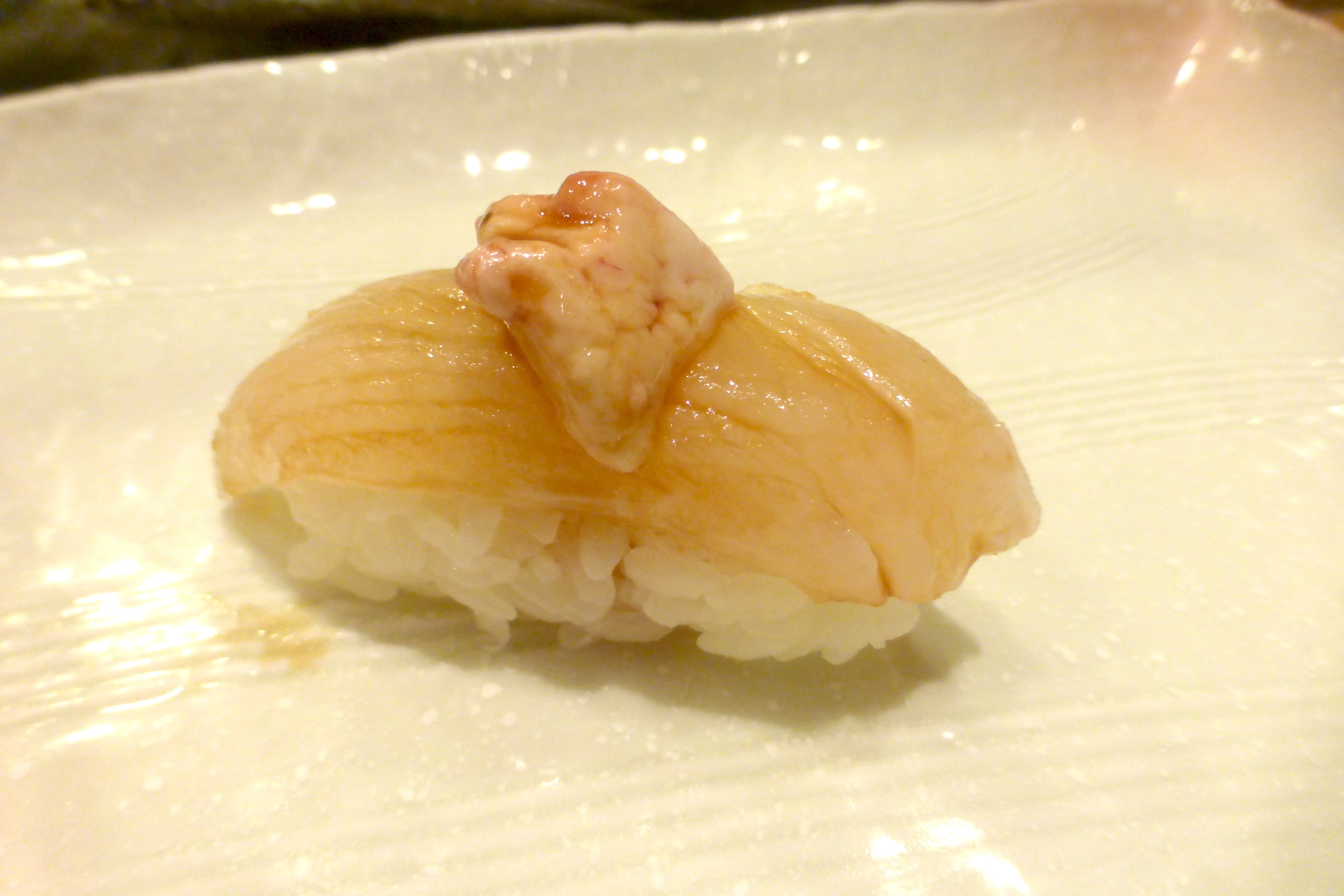

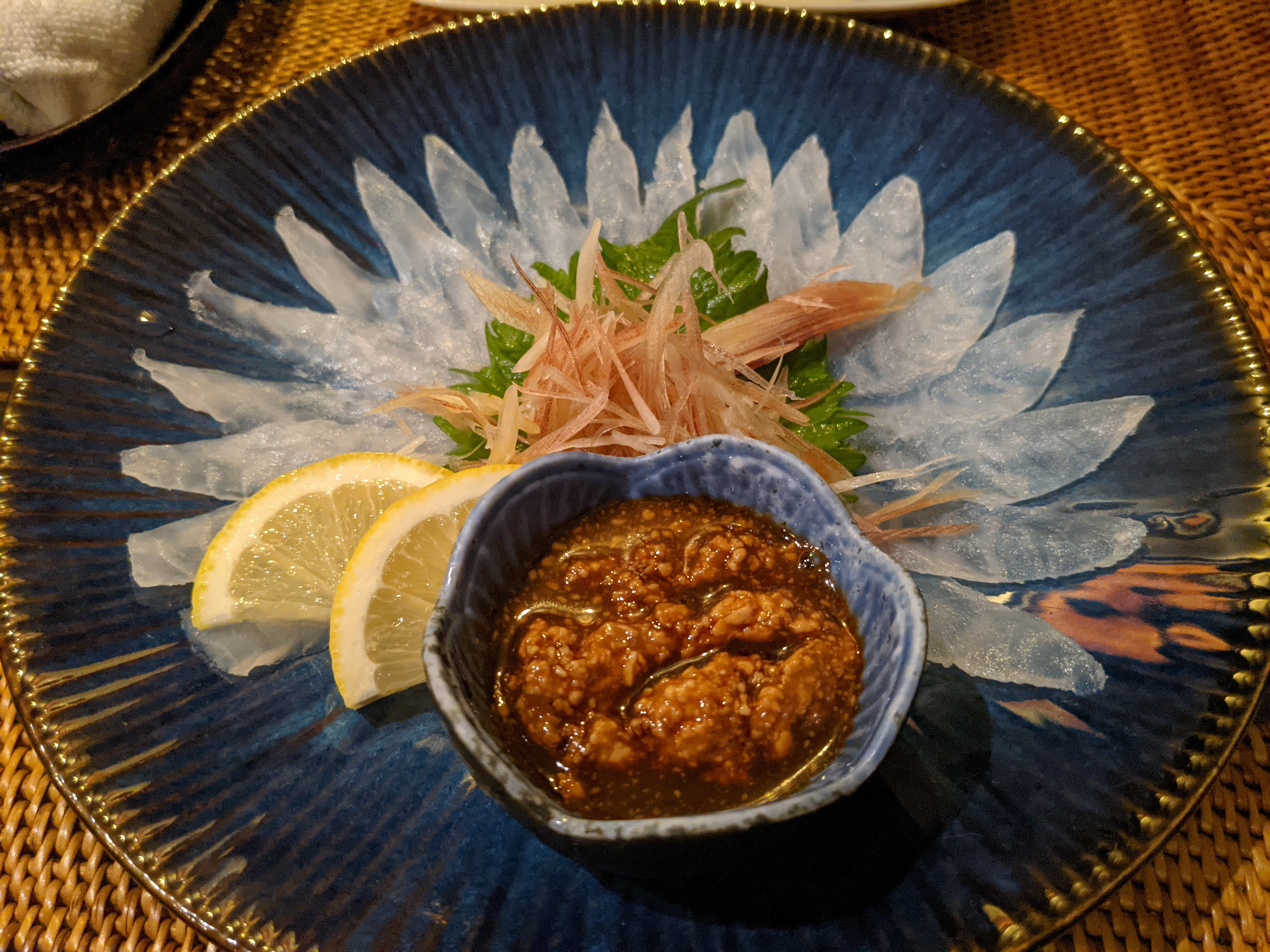
As sashimi with liver sauce

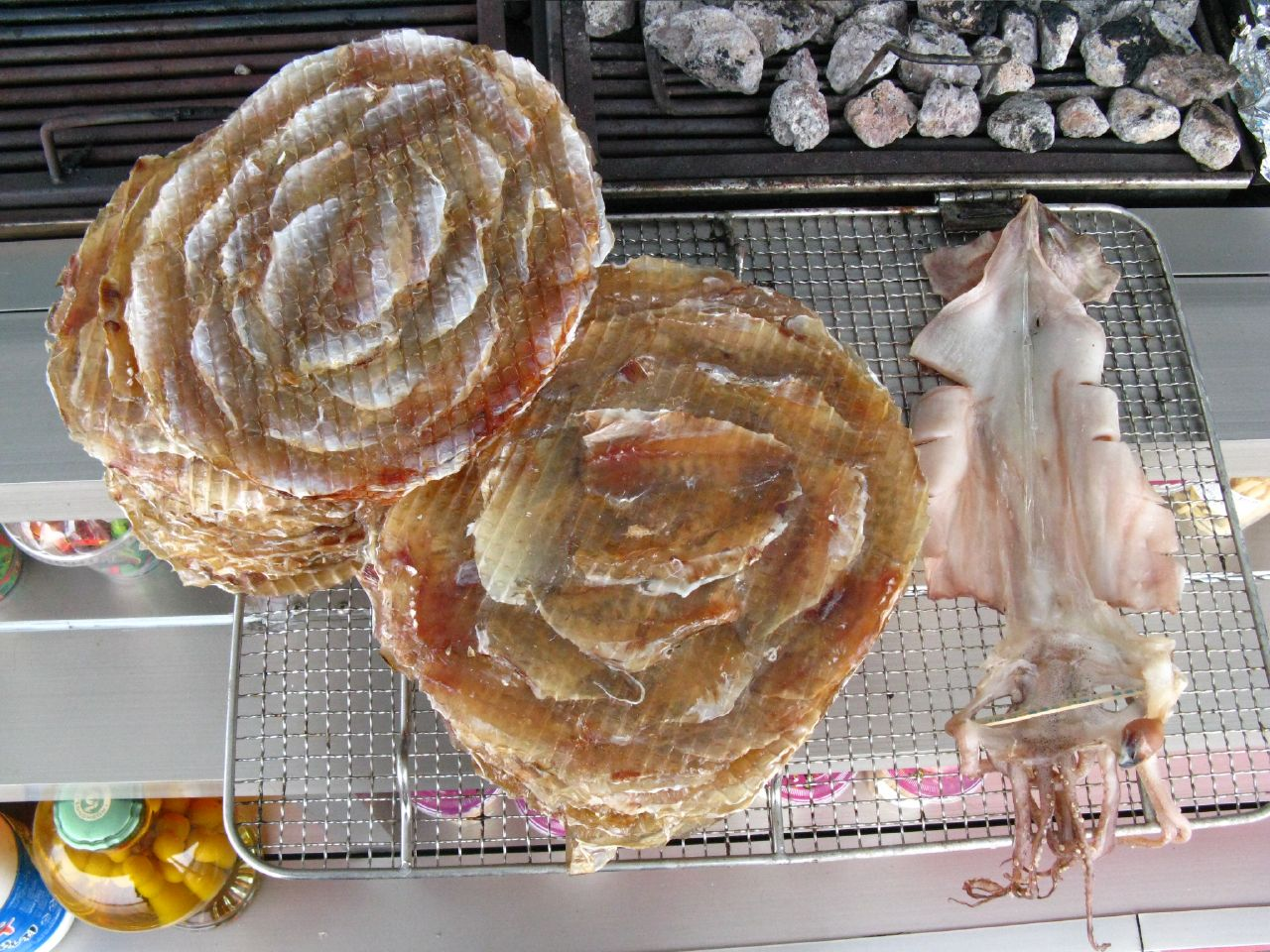
As jwipo (left)
