= Toado =

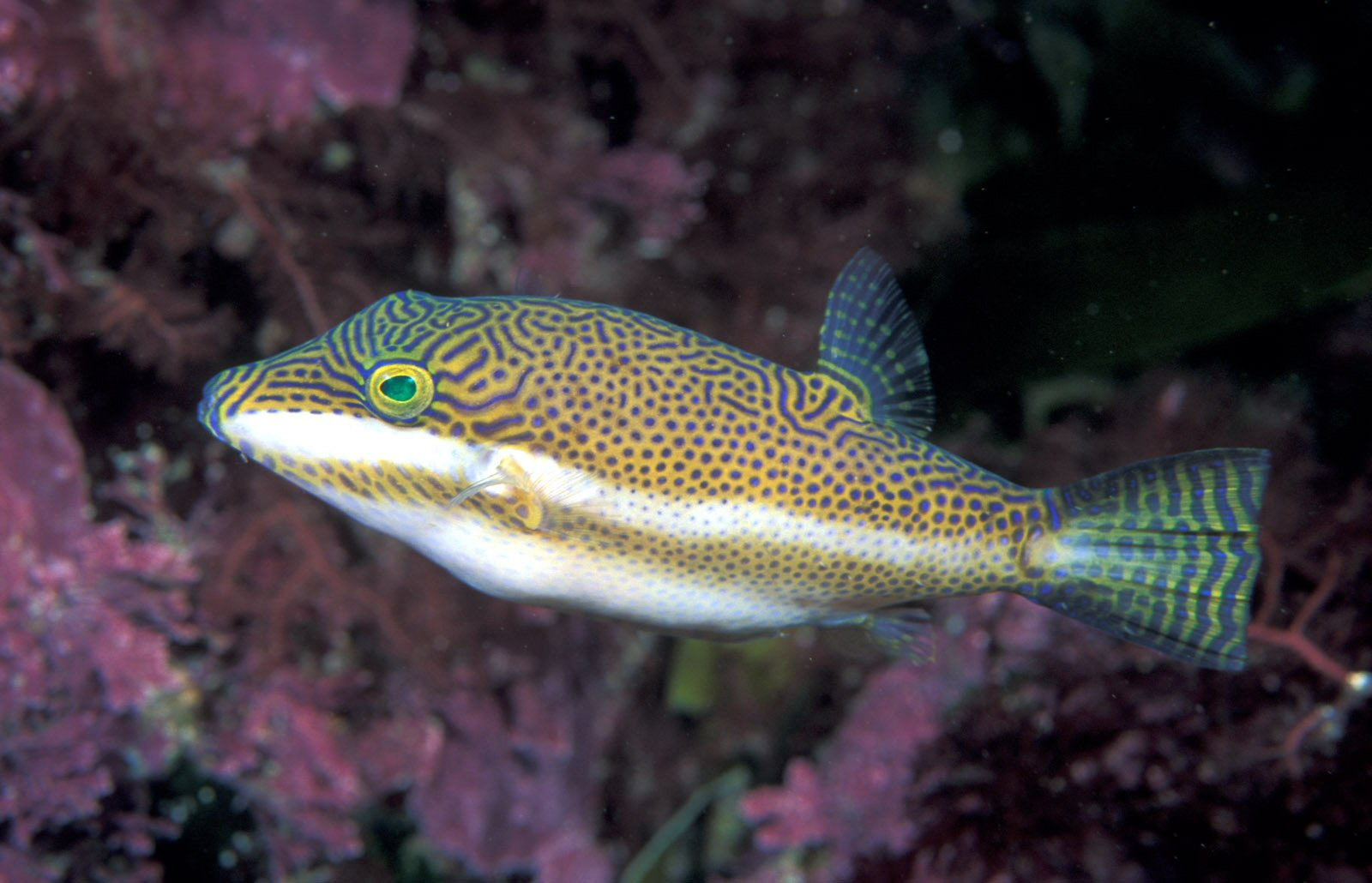
Clown toado (Canthigaster callisterna)

Toado is a common name for a variety of species of fish in the family Tetraodontidae, including:

- Common toado (also toado or common toadfish), Tetractenos hamiltoni
- Clown toado, Canthigaster callisterna
- Smooth toado (also smooth toadfish), Tetractenos glaber
- Starry toado, Arothron firmamentum
