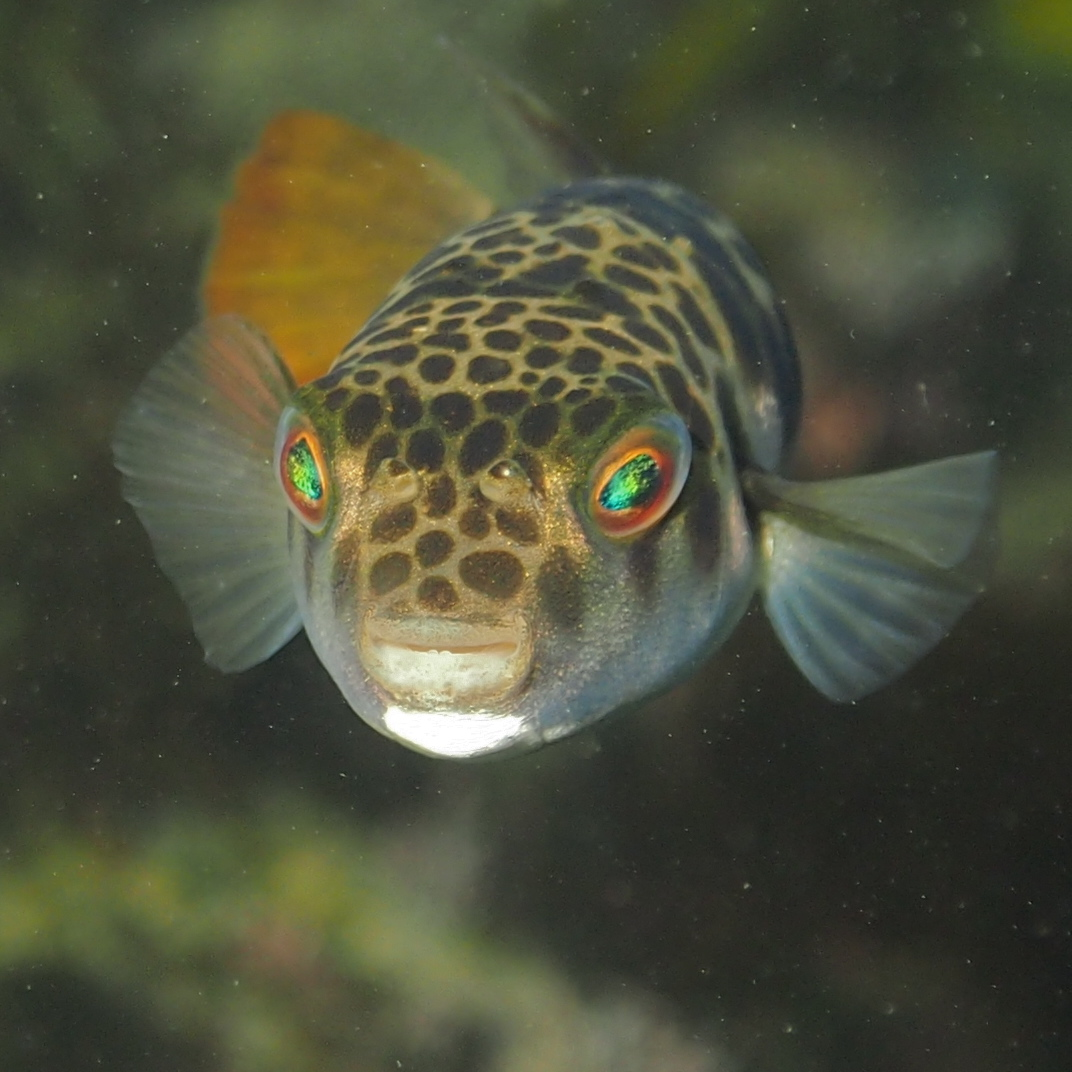
- Smooth toadfish Tetractenos glaber

Scientific classification
- Kingdom: Animalia
- Phylum: Chordata
- Class: Actinopterygii
- Division: Teleostei
- Order: Tetraodontiformes
- Family: Tetraodontidae
- Subfamily: Tetraodontinae
- Genus: Tetractenos; Hardy, 1983

= Tetractenos =

Genus of fishes

Tetractenos is a genus of Tetraodontidae. The genus can be found throughout the Indo-West Pacific and Australia's southern and eastern coastlines.

== Species ==
There are currently two recognized species in this genus:

- Tetractenos glaber (Fréminville, 1813) (Smooth toadfish)
- Tetractenos hamiltoni (J. Richardson, 1846) (Common toadfish)

== Description ==
The general colour of the species in this genus varies, as at night they take on a deeper colour than during daytime, and, as with all toadfishes and puffers, the colour of skin changes slightly depending on the mood or stress level of the animal. For example, when a Tetractenos is in oxygen-depleted water, its underbelly will be a darker colour than the usual whitish-cream. The body of both species is covered in small, gravel-like pustules (spots). Small, sandpaper-like spines can be found on the body, and when the animal "puffs up" they stick out and make it feel even more rough.

Although the colour varies, T. hamiltoni is sandy to whitish in colour, with small brown spots over most of the back and upper sides, and brown bars and blotches beneath. T. glaber has larger spots and blotches, and less prominent spines, hence its common name, smooth toadfish.

The genus Tetractenos was once classed as Tetraodon or Tetrodon, and is sometimes also confused with Torquigener.
