= Bioaccumulation =

Gradual buildup of substances in an organism

Bioaccumulation is the gradual accumulation of substances, such as pesticides or other chemicals, in an organism. Bioaccumulation occurs when an organism absorbs a substance faster than it can be lost or eliminated by catabolism and excretion. Thus, the longer the biological half-life of a toxic substance, the greater the risk of chronic poisoning, even if environmental levels of the toxin are not very high.

Ecotoxicology is the study of these effects.

Bioaccumulation, for example in fish, can be predicted by models. Hypothesis for molecular size cutoff criteria for use as bioaccumulation potential indicators are not supported by data. Biotransformation can strongly modify bioaccumulation of chemicals in an organism.

Toxicity induced by metals is associated with bioaccumulation and biomagnification. Storage or uptake of a metal faster than it is metabolized and excreted leads to the accumulation of that metal. The presence of various chemicals and harmful substances in the environment can be analyzed and assessed with a proper knowledge on bioaccumulation helping with chemical control and usage.

An organism can take up chemicals by breathing, absorbing through skin or swallowing. When the concentration of a chemical is higher within the organism compared to its surroundings (air or water), it is referred to as bioconcentration. Biomagnification is another process related to bioaccumulation as the concentration of the chemical or metal increases as it moves up from one trophic level to another. Naturally, the process of bioaccumulation is necessary for an organism to grow and develop; however, the accumulation of harmful substances can also occur.

== Examples ==
=== Terrestrial examples ===
Several plants, the so-called hyperaccumulators, concentrate elements (or ions thereof). They can concentrate up to 1000x more than adjacent non-hyperaccumulators. The topic has received attention as a possible means of removing heavy metals from contaminated areas, such as abandoned mines. The possibility of using hyperaccumulators to concentrate valuable metals - phytomining - has also been considered. One of the most serious consequences of hyperaccumulators are plants that concentrate low levels of selenium to the extent that grazing animals are threatened.

=== Aquatic examples ===
Coastal fish (such as the smooth toadfish) and seabirds (such as the Atlantic puffin) are often monitored for heavy metal bioaccumulation. Methylmercury enters into freshwater systems through industrial emissions and rain. As its concentration increases up the food web, it can reach dangerous levels for both fish and the humans who rely on fish as a food source.

Fish are typically assessed for bioaccumulation when they have been exposed to chemicals that are in their aqueous phases. Commonly tested fish species include the common carp, rainbow trout, and bluegill sunfish. Generally, fish are exposed to bioconcentration and bioaccumulation of organic chemicals in the environment through lipid layer uptake of water-borne chemicals. In other cases, the fish are exposed through ingestion/digestion of substances or organisms in the aquatic environment which contain the harmful chemicals.

Naturally produced toxins can also bioaccumulate. Coral reef fish can be responsible for the poisoning known as ciguatera when they accumulate a toxin called ciguatoxin from the phytoplankton they consume. In some eutrophic aquatic systems, biodilution can occur. This is a decrease in a contaminant with an increase in trophic level, due to higher concentrations of algae and bacteria diluting the concentration of the pollutant.

Wetland acidification can raise the chemical or metal concentrations, which leads to an increased bioavailability in marine plants and freshwater biota. Plants situated there which includes both rooted and submerged plants can be influenced by the bioavailability of metals.

=== Turtles as model species ===
Bioaccumulation in turtles occurs when contaminants like PFAS, heavy metals, or trace elements enter an organism. Pollution, climate change, and shifting landscape can affect the amounts of these toxins in the ecosystem. The most common elements studied in turtles are mercury, cadmium, lead, and selenium. Turtles naturally consume various trace elements by eating plants and sediments, and the substances bioaccumulate. Some marine turtles are used as experimental subjects to analyze bioaccumulation because their shoreline habitats enable sampling. Freshwater turtles too are used for more localised studies. PFAS in the Australian freshwater short-neck turtle Emydura macquarii affects their eggs and in turn the developmental metabolic processes and fat stores of the offspring. PFAS impacts the gut microbiome in exposed turtles. Heavy metal accumulations decrease egg-hatching rates in the Amazon River turtle, Podocnemis expansa, reducing the fat in the eggs and changing how water is filtered throughout the embryo; this can affect the survival rate of the eggs.

== See also ==
- Biomagnification (magnification of toxins with increasing trophic level)
- Chelation therapy
- Drug accumulation ratio
- Environmental impact of pesticides
- International POPs Elimination Network
- Persistent organic pollutants
- Phytoremediation (removal of pollutants by bioaccumulation in plants)
