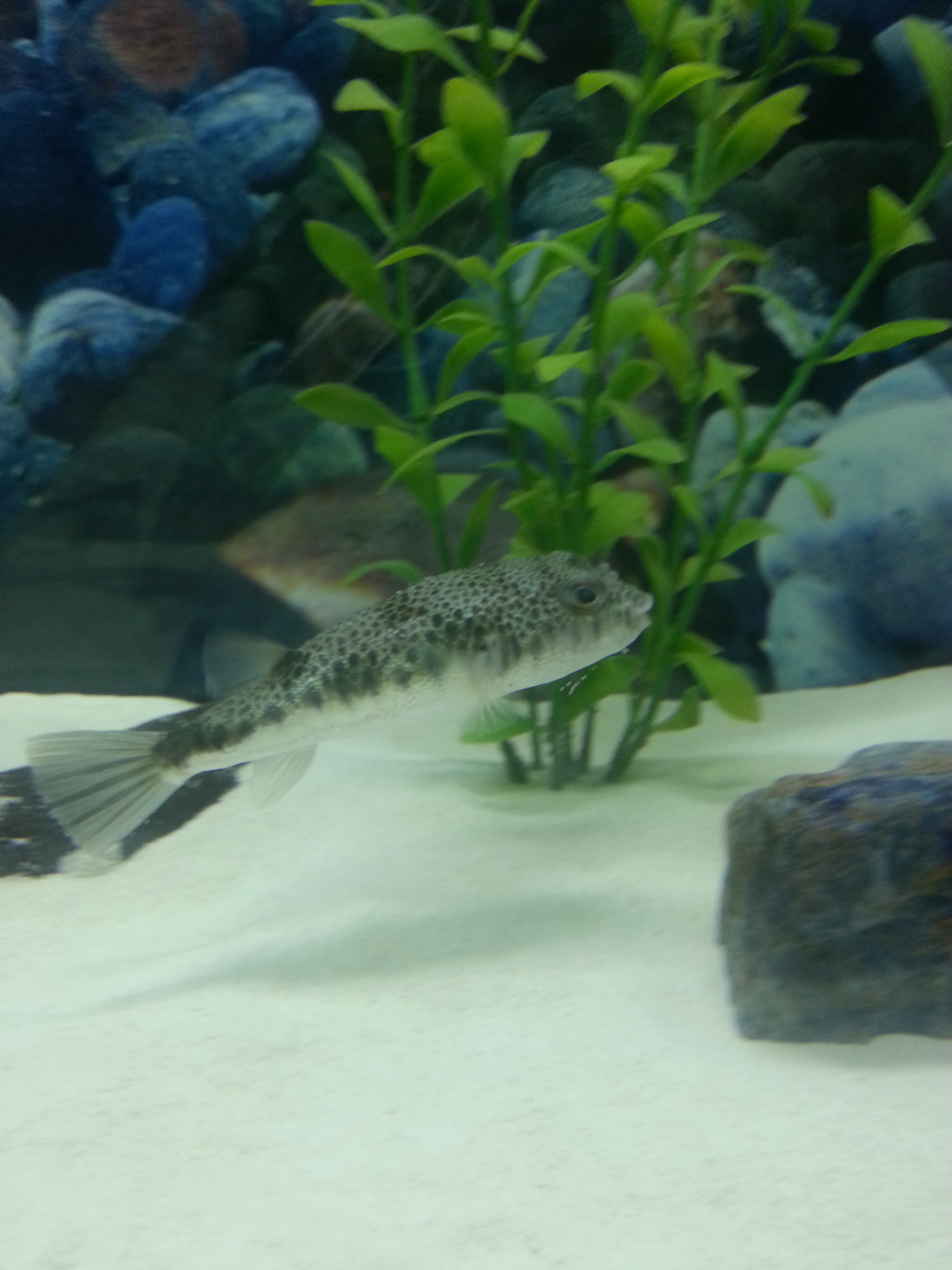

Conservation status
- Least Concern (IUCN 3.1)

Scientific classification
- Kingdom: Animalia
- Phylum: Chordata
- Class: Actinopterygii
- Order: Tetraodontiformes
- Family: Tetraodontidae
- Genus: Tetractenos
- Species: T. hamiltoni

Binomial name
- Tetractenos hamiltoni (J. Richardson, 1846)

= Common toadfish =

Species of fish

The common toadfish (Tetractenos hamiltoni), also known as the common toado, toadfish or toado, (formerly classified as Tetrodon hamiltoni or Torquigener hamiltoni) is a species of fish in the family Tetraodontidae of order Tetraodontiformes, found along Australia's eastern coast, from northern Queensland to Flinders Island, and around Lord Howe Island, as well as in New Zealand waters. It often buries itself in sand with only its eyes exposed.

The fish is sandy to whitish in colour, with small brown spots over most of the back and upper sides, and brown bars and blotches beneath. It has a maximum length of 14 centimetres (5.5 in). It is similar in appearance to the smooth toadfish, but has smaller spots and more prominent spines in the skin.

Like some other fish, the common toadfish is able to vary the amount of pigment in its cornea, which becomes yellow in colour under bright light.

It is (rarely) used as an aquarium fish for brackish-water aquariums. Along with related toadfish species, it is known in Australia as a "toadie."

As with other fish of this family, the flesh is poisonous, due to tetrodotoxin, and eating the fish can have fatal consequences.

== See also ==
- Aquarium fishery
- Smooth toadfish, Tetractenos glaber
- List of brackish aquarium fish species
