= Toadie =

Toadie may refer to:

- Toadfish Rebecchi, a long-running character in the Australian soap opera Neighbours
- In Australian usage, the smooth toadfish, common toadfish, and related fish species
- Toadwart, a cartoon character from Disney's Adventures of the Gummi Bears
- Toadies, an alternative rock band from Fort Worth, Texas

== See also ==
- Toad
- Frog and Toad
