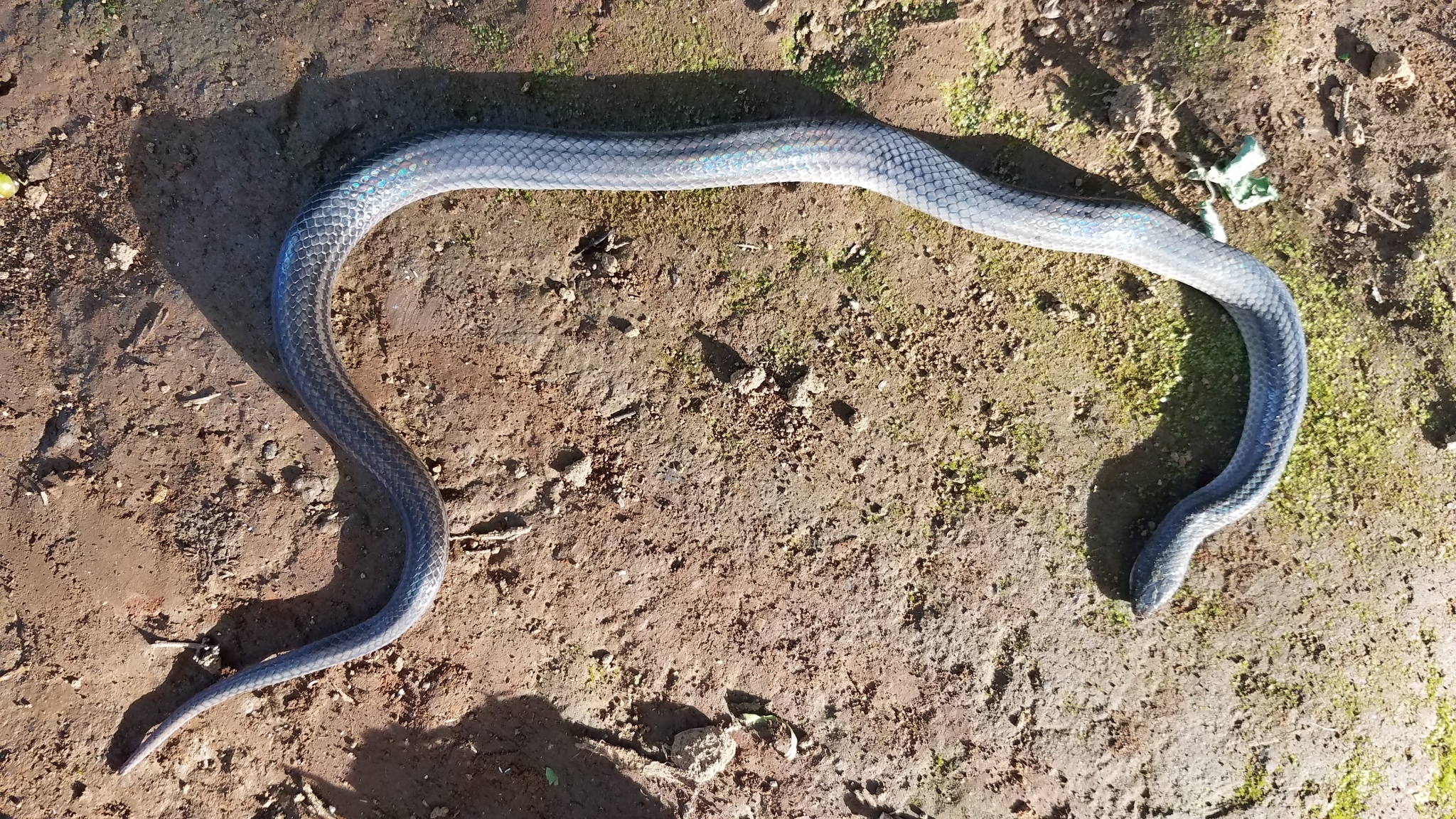
- Stenorrhina freminvillei

Scientific classification
- Kingdom: Animalia
- Phylum: Chordata
- Class: Reptilia
- Order: Squamata
- Suborder: Serpentes
- Family: Colubridae
- Subfamily: Colubrinae
- Genus: Stenorrhina; A.M.C. Duméril, 1853

= Stenorrhina =

Genus of snakes

Stenorrhina is a genus of snakes in the family Colubridae.

== Species ==
Two species are recognized as being valid.

- Stenorrhina degenhardtii (Berthold, 1846) - Degenhardt's scorpion-eating snake, southeastern Mexico, Central America, northwestern South America
- Stenorrhina freminvillei (A.M.C. Duméril, Bibron & A.H.A. Duméril, 1854) – blood snake, slaty gray snake, southern Mexico, Central America

== Etymology ==
The specific name, freminvillei, is in honor of French naval officer and naturalist Christophe-Paulin de La Poix de Freminville.
