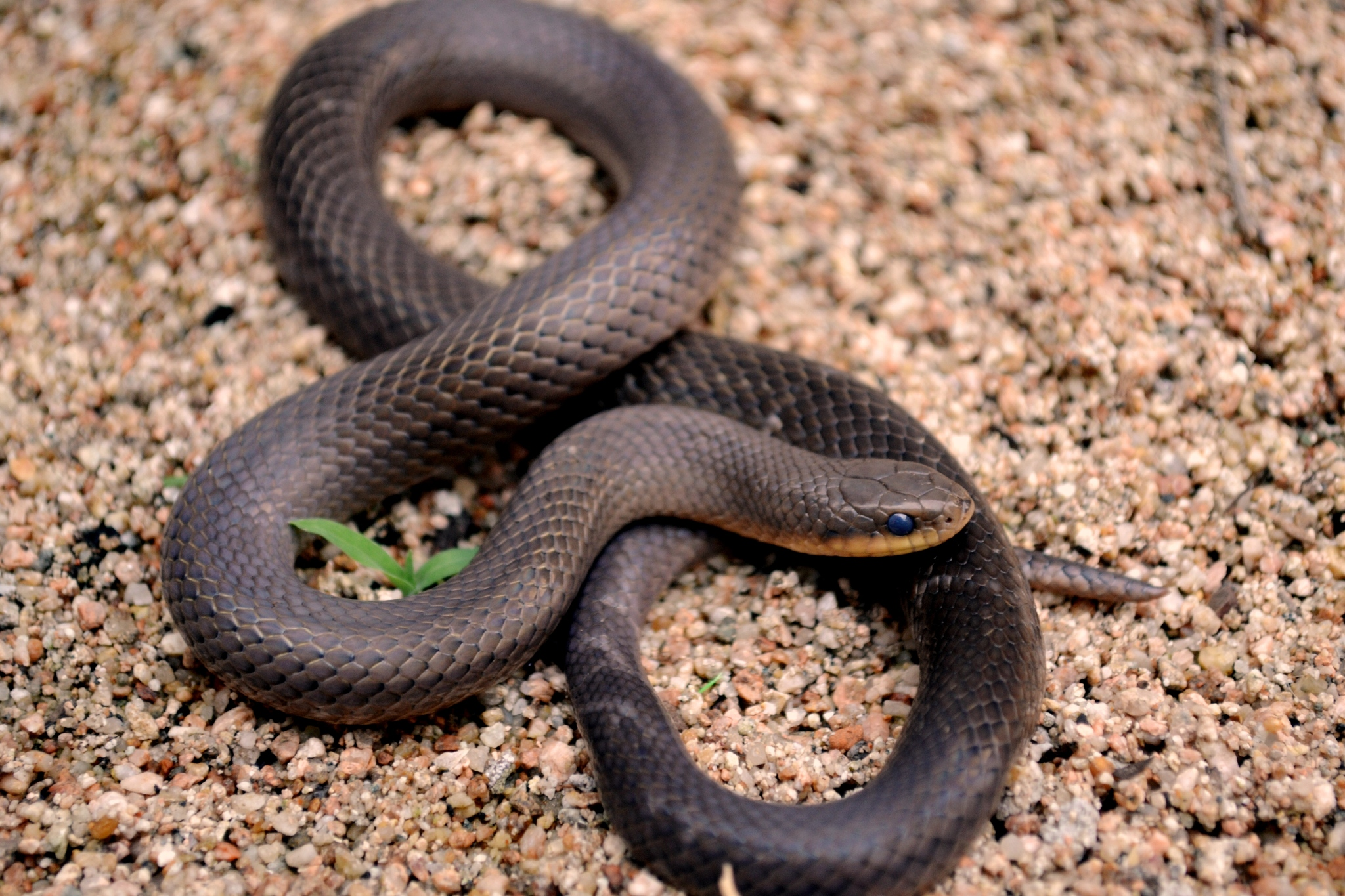
- Stenorrhina freminvillei

Conservation status
- Least Concern (IUCN 3.1)

Scientific classification
- Kingdom: Animalia
- Phylum: Chordata
- Class: Reptilia
- Order: Squamata
- Suborder: Serpentes
- Family: Colubridae
- Genus: Stenorrhina
- Species: S. freminvillei

Binomial name
- Stenorrhina freminvillei ((A.M.C. Duméril, Bibron & A.H.A. Duméril, 1854)

= Stenorrhina freminvillei =

Species of snake

Stenorrhina freminvillei, the blood snake or slaty gray snake, is a species of snake of the family Colubridae.

The snake is found in Mexico, Guatemala, El Salvador, Honduras, Nicaragua, and Costa Rica. .
