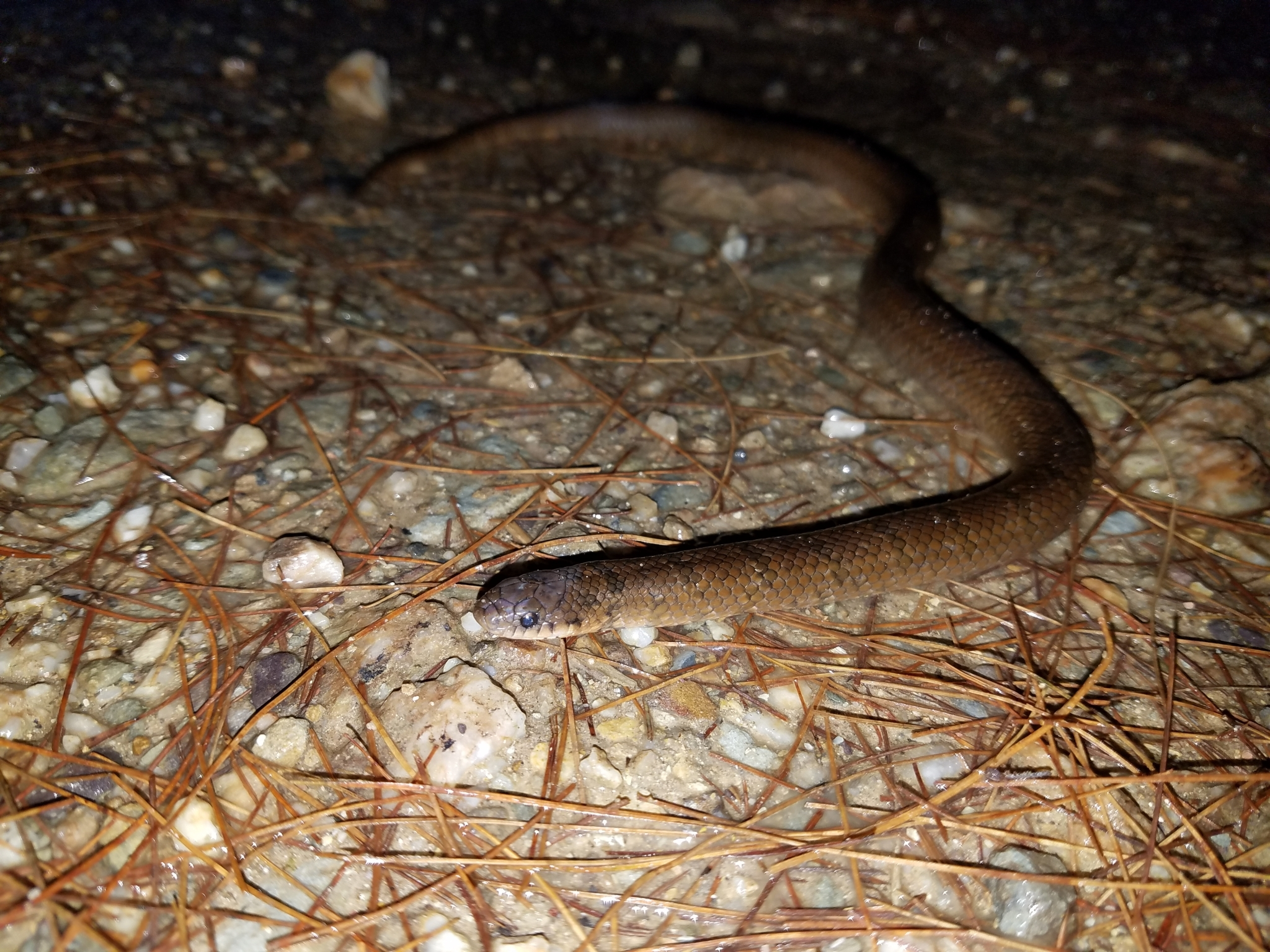

Conservation status
- Least Concern (IUCN 3.1)

Scientific classification
- Kingdom: Animalia
- Phylum: Chordata
- Class: Reptilia
- Order: Squamata
- Suborder: Serpentes
- Family: Colubridae
- Genus: Stenorrhina
- Species: S. degenhardtii

Binomial name
- Stenorrhina degenhardtii (Berthold, 1846)

Synonyms
- Calamaria degenhardtii Berthold 1846; Stenorhina ventralis A.M.C. Duméril, Bibron & A.H.A. Duméril, 1854; Stenorhina kennicottiana Cope, 1860; Stenorrhina degenhardtii — Cope, 1876

= Stenorrhina degenhardtii =

Species of snake

Stenorrhina degenhardtii, also known by its common name Degenhardt's scorpion-eating snake, is a species of snake in the family Colubridae. The species is native to southeastern Mexico, Central America, and northwestern South America. There are three recognized subspecies.

== Etymology ==
The specific name, degenhardtii, is in honor of a German named Degenhardt who collected amphibians and reptiles in northern South America in the 1840s.

== Geographic range ==
S. degenhardtii is found in the Mexican states of Chiapas, Oaxaca, and Veracruz; in the Central American countries of Belize, Costa Rica, Guatemala, Honduras, Nicaragua, and Panama; and in the South American countries of Colombia, Ecuador, Peru, and Venezuela.

== Habitat ==
The preferred natural habitats of S. degenhardti are forest and savanna, at altitudes from sea level to 2,800 m (9,200 ft), but it has also been found in agricultural areas.

== Description ==
A medium-sized snake, S. degenhardtii may attain a total length (including tail) of 65 cm (26 in).

== Behavior ==
S. degenhardtii is diurnal and terrestrial.

== Diet ==
S. degenhardtii preys predominately upon scorpions and spiders, but also eats crickets, grasshoppers, and insect larvae.

== Reproduction ==
S. degenhardtii is oviparous. Clutch size is 11–12 eggs.

== Subspecies ==
Three subspecies are recognized as being valid, including the nominotypical subspecies.

- Stenorrhina degenhardtii degenhardtii (Berthold, 1846)
- Stenorrhina degenhardtii mexicana (Steindachner, 1867)
- Stenorrhina degenhardtii ocellata Jan & Sordelli, 1876
