= Aquarium fishery =

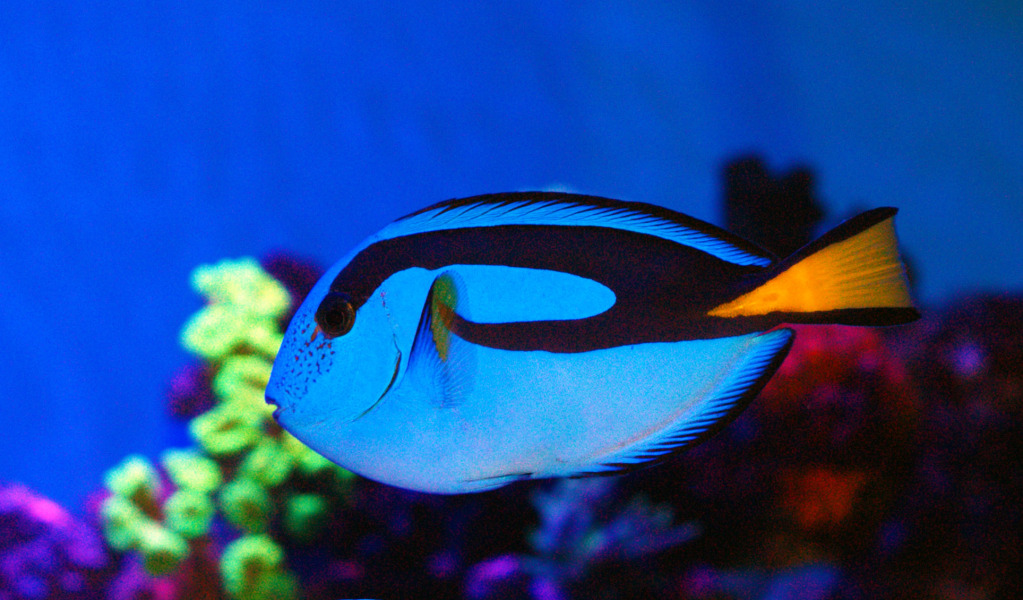
The royal blue tang is only caught in the wild and protects the coral reef

Aquarium fishery is the process of fishing wild fish for sale to private and public aquariums.

== Sources ==
Aquarium fisheries collect primarily saltwater fish, typically colorful reef fish. Major fishery areas are in the waters off the United States (Hawaii, Florida), Fiji Islands, Australia, the Philippines, Sri Lanka, and Indonesia. According to a report by the National Geographic “tens of millions of marine animals” are collected each year, more than half of them ending up in the US. It is estimated that about 1,800 species of tropical fish are collected and traded. Sea Sherpherd estimates that about 25 million fish are in the commercial pipeline of which “nearly all will die within a year from the point of capture”. Others estimates the number at 30 million animals, the vast majority coming from the Philippines and Indonesia. Aside from fish the pipeline also moves invertebrates and live corals.

== Regulation ==
The industry is largely unregulated and lacks a central data base to assess its impact upon the environment. Different fisheries are regulated or managed differently and with various degrees of oversight. For example, lack of oversight has led to the widespread use of cyanide to stun fish to collect them in the Philippines although officially it is illegal. While the US is required to monitor import of species listed by the Convention on International Trade in Endangered Species (CITES) the majority of fish imported for aquariums is lumped together as marine tropical fish (MATF) by the US Fish and Wildlife Service. Thus import of endangered species within this group is not monitored. The lack of an adequate database about tropical fish, - life cycle, growth and reproductive rate, population development over time - makes it difficult to monitor the impact of aquarium fisheries. Overcollection can be damaging to the coral reef as the example of the regal blue tang has shown. As these fish eat algae that overgrow corals, their removal endangers the health of the coral.

== Demise of MAC ==
The Marine Aquarium Council (MAC) was an international organization formed in 1998 by stake holders including animal collectors, exporters, importers, retailers, aquarium keepers, and public aquariums, conservation organizations and government agencies. MAC recognized problems in the trade and wanted to address them. Vosseler listed them as follows:

- Use of cyanide and other destructive collection methods
- Poor handling and husbandry practices
- Unnecessary animal mortality
- Collection of unwanted and/or unsuitable species
- Potential for stock depletion
- Ecosystem effect of live coral and live rock exports
- Potential for alien species introduction
- Lack of reliable data on the resources and the trade
- Limited government capacity for reef management and enforcement
- Potential for government trade restrictions

The stake holders were unable to regulate the industry and MAC ceased to function due to internal disagreements in 2008.

== Call for prohibition ==
With the lack of oversight and the danger to the environment by overfishing environmentalists have called for stricter regulation and even prohibition of the collecting of wild fish for private aquariums. Captive-bred tropical fish are readily available for hobbyists. "In this day and age, where the ocean faces a crisis ... there's absolutely no justification for a fishery for hobby," indicated Mike Long of Sea Shepherd.

Environmental efforts led Hawaii to enact some protection in the late 1990s when certain sections were closed to aquarium fisheries. There is evidence that these protective measure have been effective, but reefs are also endangered from other factors such as fertilizer run-off and coastal development.
