= Live fish trade =

Trade of live fish for human consumption

The live fish trade can refer to the live food fish trade (for human consumption) or to the ornamental fish trade (for aquariums). The fish can come from many places, but most comes from Southeast Asia. The live food fish trade is a global system that links fishing communities with markets, primarily in Hong Kong and mainland China. Many of the fish are captured on coral reefs in Southeast Asia or the Pacific Island nations.

== Consumer demand ==
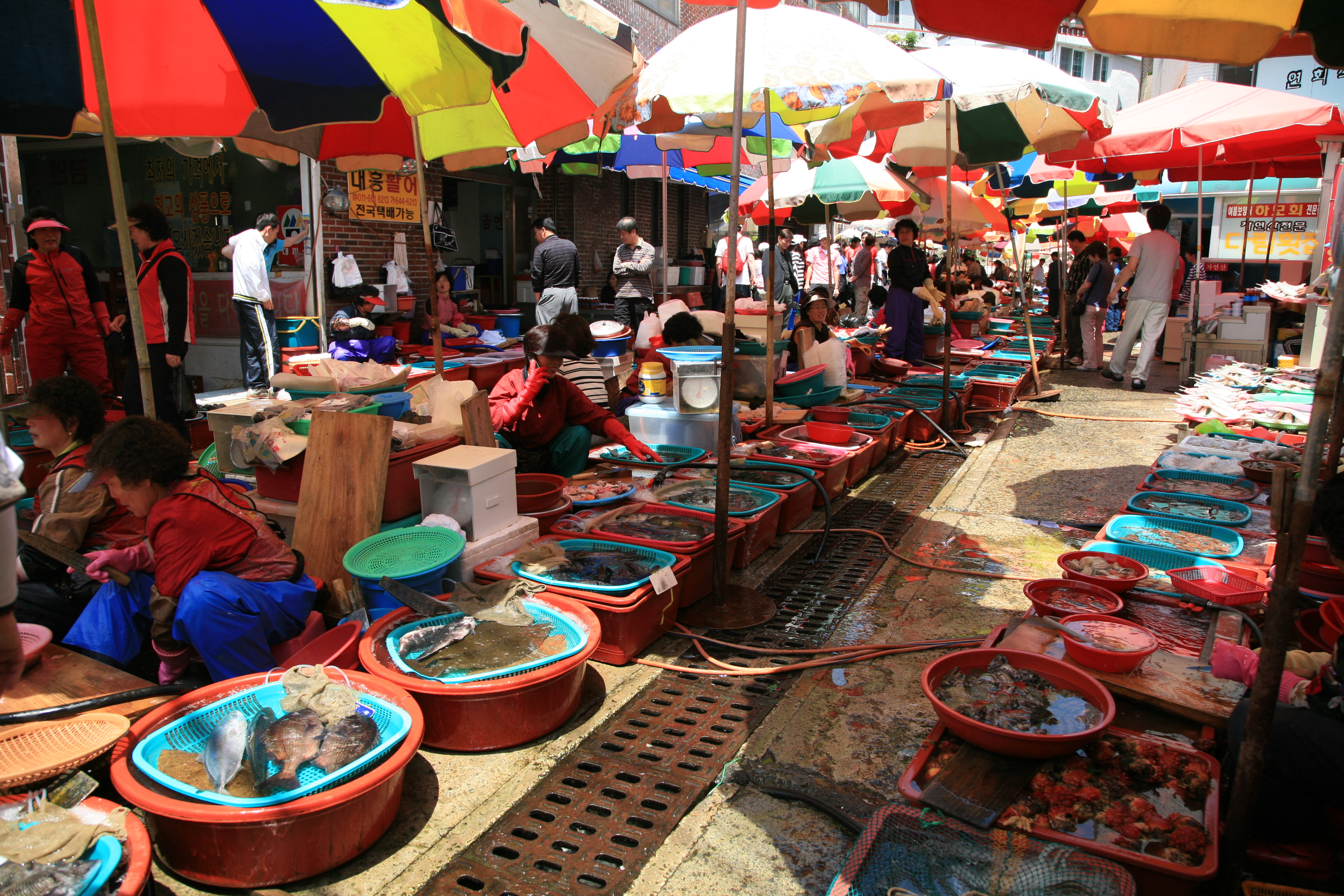
Live fish market in Tongyeong, Korea

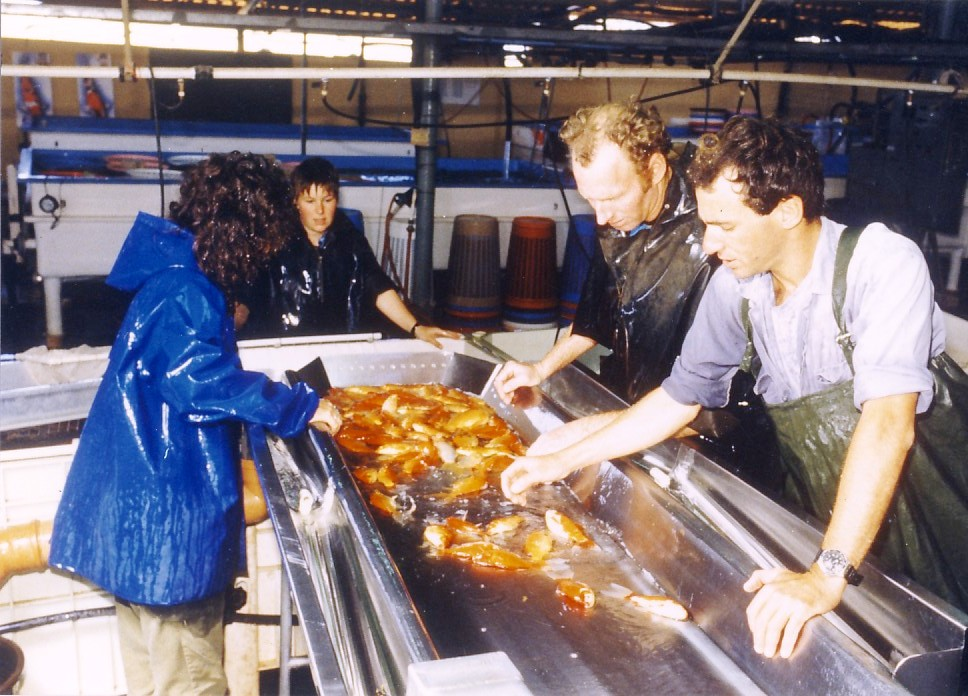
Production line of live ornamental fish

Within the live food trade there are certain types of fish demanded more often by consumers, particularly smaller and medium-sized fish. According to the book While Stocks Last: The Live Reef Food Fish Trade consumer demand has caused the fish captured on coral reefs to be the most valued fish in the trade. Consumers are important because they are directly purchasing these fish species at restaurants and stores. In addition to these types of fishes, many juvenile fish are used for the live food trade. There are also cultural and regional preferences among consumers, for example, Chinese consumers often prefer their fish to be reddish in color believing the color to be auspicious. These preferences inevitably affect the biodiversity of marine life making certain fish species rarer to find.

The life fish food trade is a lucrative business. According to University of Washington Professor Patrick Christie, live fish caught for food export earns approximately $6000 a ton. To help support themselves and their families, fishermen in Oceania and Southeast Asia sometimes use illegal fishing methods. Although many feel the fish are worth the cost, a typical dinner can cost up to one hundred dollars per kilogram. The wholesale value on these fish is anywhere from eleven US dollars to sixty-three US dollars per kilogram, meaning there’s a large markup and resale value. (Hong Kong alone is estimated to be about four hundred million US dollars a year.) Because this trade frequently uses illegal methods of collecting (using cyanide), there is no way to know for sure how much money is being made each year on live fish trade, although estimates conclude probably over one billion US dollars each year.

As is often the case, consumers are willing to pay large amounts of money on rare and fresh fish. One 500-pound, polka-dot grouper, estimated to be more than a century old, was hacked into fillets by seven kitchen workers in about half an hour, the Economist reports. It was expected to bring about $15,000.

== Market and trade routes ==
The center for the Live Food Fish Trade is located in Hong Kong -- the markets consumers contribute $400 million to the estimated $1 billion of the trades global value. Total imports flowing into Hong Kong included 10153 metric tons, of which 30 percent was re-exported to mainland China. Other major markets include Singapore, mainland China, and Taiwan. The primary suppliers of wild caught fish are Indonesia (accounting for nearly 50 percent of Hong Kong's imports), Thailand, Malaysia, Australia, and Vietnam. However, Taiwan and Malaysia are leading the charge towards farmed live fish specializing in an industry that "harvested annually has probably been in the billions [Metric Tons]". Farming live fish is gaining popularity as tastes for live fish are burgeoning across South Asia and countries look to become more and more self sustainable, this is apparent in nations with sizable Chinese populations such as Indonesia and Malaysia.

Hong Kong and China are the dominant markets for the live fish, in addition to other cities in the region that have large Chinese populations, including Singapore and Kuala Lumpur. In Southeast Asia, Singapore alone consumes 500 tons of live coral fish a year. Exports from Southeast Asia rose to over 5,000 tons in 1995 from 400 tons in 1989. However, in 1996, exports declined by 22%. Indonesia, which accounts for over 60% of the harvest, saw exports falling by over 450 tons. That same year, other Southeast Asian countries have experienced similar drops in stocks of live coral fish for food. In 1996, the Philippines' exports were halved, while Malaysian exports declined by over 30%. These decreases in catch have been due to the excessive amount of fish caught for exports and the degradation of the coral reefs from such procedures.

== Corruption in the trade ==
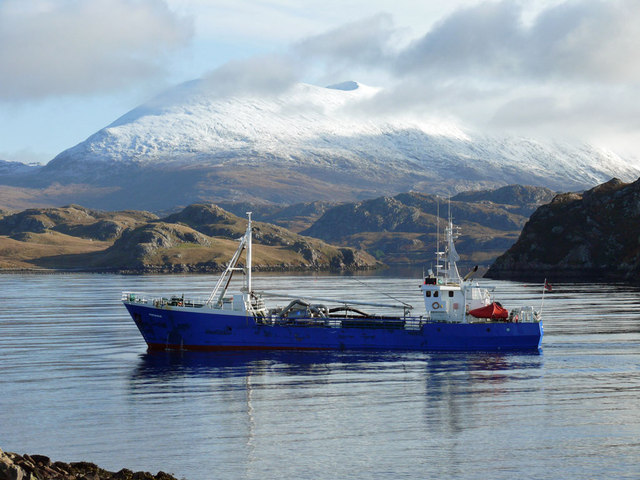
The "well-boat", or live fish carrier, Hedda, turning into Kinlochbervie Harbour, Scotland

The live fish trade is a complex issue that involves many different perspectives, all of which must be considered in trying to approach a solution. While, at first, one may point the finger at the fishermen themselves as the criminals, there are many other factors. One is the economic disparity of many of the communities that take part in cyanide, dynamite, or other illegal fishing practices. 40% of the Filipino population and 27% of the Indonesian population is considered to be in poverty. Many whose livelihood once depended on fishing or agriculture are realizing it is more lucrative to participate in illegal fishing activities.

Community members who are not a part of the trade are affected by the activities of these illegal fishers. The cyanide fishers profit by taking away from everyone else’s trade and food. ‘If people were using poison and my take dropped to only a little, I would accept it,’ Puah said. ‘But I feel heartsick…I catch nothing at all. I have not caught a big fish in a month so there’s no point in going fishing this afternoon.’” The local people are often helpless to protect themselves, as government and law enforcement officials have "open pockets" and are also involved in the trade by turning a blind eye to the illegal actions and receiving a take of the profits. “Culpability in cyanide use cannot be understood apart from the larger structures of corruption that permeates resource extraction throughout Indonesia. The Indonesian State bureaucracy extends from Jakarta down to the village level, and radiates out into villages through kinship connections. It is the factor most tightly correlated with illegal trade in natural resources throughout Indonesia.”

== Cause and effect ==
Coral reefs found in the South Pacific are regarded as the "rainforest of the sea" harboring countless fish species large and small. However, recently the live fish trade has threatened the sanctity of these endangered areas. The Global Coral Reef Monitoring Network has issued a recent report that estimates that 25% of the world's reefs are severely damaged and another third are in grave danger. The live fish trade is part of this alarming ecological trend caused by the popular use of cyanide which is injected into the coral reefs to stun inhabiting fish so they can be easily caught by nets. It is estimated that since the 1960s, more than one million kilograms of cyanide has been squirted into Philippine reefs alone, and since then the practice has spread throughout the South Pacific.

The live fish trade is only growing, in 1994 the Philippines exported 200,000 kg of live fish; by 2004 the Philippines were annually exporting 800,000 kg annually. Although Asian markets are the primary buyers of live reef fish for food, the recently created U.S. Coral Reef Task Force has concluded that the U.S. is the primary purchaser of live reef fish for aquariums as well as eclectic jewelry. Even though the use of cyanide in the live fish trade is severely detrimental, one must realize that this issue is multidimensional. Small-scale native fishermen of the small South Pacific coastal communities are the backbone of the live fish trade, and are forced to resort to the illegal use of sodium cyanide due to demand and high prices offered by the industry.

== Fishing techniques ==
While live food fish trade can be very profitable for those involved, there are many dangerous aspects to it. Through the use of illegal practices such as cyanide fishing, coral reefs and fish communities are put in grave danger. The process of cyanide fishing involves dissolving crushed cyanide tablets and squirting this solution from a bottle toward the targeted fish on top of coral heads. Specifically, the cyanide kills coral polyps, symbiotic algae, and other coral reefs organisms that are necessary for maintaining the health of the coral reef. These damages eventually deteriorate the coral reef and lead it into collapse of the entire coral reef ecosystem. The effect on the targeted fish is disorientation and semi-paralysis. After being squirted with cyanide, the fish are easy brought to the surface and kept alive in small, on-board containers. Fishermen often understand that this practice is harmful and will offer locals a portion of the fish in order to continue fishing. When ingested, small levels of cyanide accumulate in the system causing weakness of fingers and toes, failure of the thyroid gland and blurred vision. Divers without experience may come in direct contact with cyanide, causing death. Estimates show that since the 1960s, over a million kilograms of cyanide have been squirted into the coral reefs of the Philippines alone. The harm upon the reefs is coming full circle and having a social impact through the limited fish stocks. As fish are depleted from these fishing techniques, the fishermen are having a more difficult time feeding themselves.

Additionally, the use of explosives may be used as a fishing technique in the live food fish trade. While the majority of these fish do not survive the blast of such explosions, the remaining fish that are only stunned are collected for the live food fish trade. The use of cyanide makes a stronger argument in that the more coral reef fish captured alive, the more lucrative the catch is for the fisherman. Live fish, according to the [WWF], fetch five times more than a dead fish. This is why banning the live-fish trade would similarly harm the reefs. Fisherman would resort to the "dead fish trade", be forced to deal in a larger quantity of fish, and the process of dangerous fishing techniques continues. To illustrate the effects of repeated explosions in the proximity of a coral reef system, roughly one half of the coral reefs in Komodo National Park in Indonesia have been destroyed. The use of cyanide and explosives in fishing proves to be an effective technique in catching fish, but its powers are indiscriminating and as a result the coral reefs are being held hostage to such practices. The future of the reefs are in question just as are the futures of those who subsist from them because "from a long term perspective, the question of ethics of using the ocean...contains a commitment for future generations".

== Impacts on humans ==
In communities like those in the Philippines and Indonesia, people are participating in the live food fish trade because it is a source of income, or at least a source of temporary income. For some communities this is one of the few income-generating opportunities. Along with the environmental, ecological, and economic consequences of this industry, there are serious health risks as well. Because of inadequate training and lack of quality equipment, divers, especially young men are in large risk of paralysis.

== Sustainable practices ==
Because of the great profitability of this industry, there is a great incentive to identify sustainable practices. The Marine Aquarium Council (MAC) works to offer the hobbyist with a product that is certified as environmentally sound and sustainable. Additionally, the International Marinelife Alliance (IMA), The Nature Conservancy (TNC), and MAC are working with the Hong Kong Chamber of Seafood Merchants to develop standards for the live fish trade. The Hong Kong Seafood Merchants represent ninety percent of the buyers of live reef food fish in Hong Kong and have an extensive impact on collection practices.

== Aquaculture ==
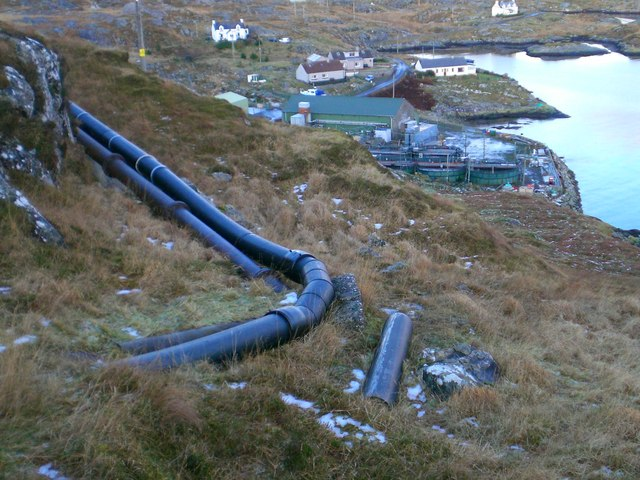
A fish hatchery at Loch an Eilein, Scotland, which exports young salmon via a live fish carrying ship that comes into the bay. The fish are taken to sea cages where they grow larger.

In an effort to address the damage inflicted on coral reef eco-systems and fish stocks, aquaculture is being utilized to reduce pressure on coral reefs. However, initial efforts to farm grouper have met with significant challenges. There are difficulties with fragile grouper seed that can make it more expensive than wild caught larvae, which can affect natural replenishment rates. Additionally, there are problems with finding suitable food, disease and cannibalism.

Efforts are also being made in regards to the aquarium fish trade. Juvenile fish are being captured and raised specifically for the industry. However, there are debates as to whether this practice will affect replenishment rates. “The age of the juveniles is pivotal to the debate, harvesting of postlarvae from the water column is considered to have a much lower (negligible) impact on rates of replenishment than the removal of the larger juveniles from benthic habitats because the postlarvae have yet to undergo severe mortality”. If studies determine that the capture of juveniles is sustainable, it may help in mitigating the damage from cyanide fishing.

Aquaculture production, specifically grouper rearing is rapidly expanding in Asia. From 1998 to 2001 the Indo-Pacific countries involved in aquaculture; China, Indonesia, Republic of Korea, Kuwait, Malaysia, Philippines, Singapore, and Thailand witnessed a 119 percent increase in output. The explosion in this practice can most likely be attributed to the large profit margins that can be derived in very little time. It is estimated that the majority of farms after annual returns can be paid back in less than one year. In comparison to other species of fish such as the Milkfish, the Grouper, because of high demand is able to garner high rates of return, in order to earn 1,000 dollars a grouper farm would only have to raise 400 kilograms in contrast to 5,000 kilograms of Milkfish.

The largest sector of Florida'a aquaculture production by value is ornamental fish. In 2023 Florida produced $57 million of ornamental fish, 95% of the total production in the United States.

== See also ==
- Corf
- Fish processing
- Fish market
