= Marine Aquarium Council =

Non-profit stewardship organization

The Marine Aquarium Council (MAC) was a non-profit stewardship organization based in Los Angeles, California. Established to provide education and certification to fisheries of ornamental marine aquarium fish, as well as facilitate the supply of ecologically sustainable imports for wholesalers and dealers of fish, coral, and invertebrates for use and sale in marine aquariums, MAC monitored the trade in order to optimize its relevancy and effectiveness in the live fish trade.

MAC ceased to exist in 2008.

== History ==
The Marine Aquarium Council was created in 1998 to create universal system of standards and eco-labeling in the marine aquarium trade. MAC worked with conservation officials, fisheries, importers, and wholesalers to develop certification programs at fisheries in the Philippines, Indonesia, Fiji, Hawaii, and the UK. Compliance to its standards is voluntary. MAC issued certificates of compliance to fisheries, importers, exporters, and retailers throughout Southeast Asia, North America, and Europe. MAC certification was the only program of its kind to offer wholesalers and retailers a credential recognizing environmental stewardship and ethical treatment of marine life.
