= Biodilution =

Biodilution, sometimes referred to as bloom dilution, is the decrease in concentration of an element or pollutant with an increase in trophic level. This effect is primarily observed during algal blooms whereby an increase in algal biomass reduces the concentration of pollutants in organisms higher up in the food chain, like zooplankton or daphnia.

The primary elements and pollutants of concern are heavy metals such as mercury, cadmium, and lead. These toxins have been shown to bioaccumulate up a food web. In some cases, metals, such as mercury, can biomagnify. This is a major concern since methylmercury, the most toxic mercury species, can be found in high concentrations in human-consumed fish and other aquatic organisms.

Numerous studies have linked lower mercury concentrations in zooplankton found in eutrophic (nutrient-rich and highly productive) as compared to oligotrophic (low nutrient) aquatic environments. Nutrient enrichment (mainly phosphorus and nitrogen) reduce the input of mercury, and other heavy metals, into aquatic food webs through this biodilution effect. Primary producers, such as phytoplankton, uptake these heavy metals and accumulate them into their cells. The higher the population of phytoplankton, the less concentrated these pollutants will be in their cells. Once consumed by primary consumers, such as zooplankton, these phytoplankton-bound pollutants are incorporated into the consumer’s cells. Higher phytoplankton biomass means a lower concentration of pollutants accumulated by the zooplankton, and so on up the food web. This effect causes an overall dilution of the original concentration up the food web. That is, the concentration of a pollutant will be lower in the zooplankton than the phytoplankton in a high bloom condition.

Although most biodilution studies have been on freshwater environments, biodilution has been shown to occur in the marine environment as well. The Northwater Polynya, located in Baffin Bay, was found to have a negative correlation of cadmium, lead, and nickel with an increase in trophic level Cadmium and lead are both non-essential metals that will compete for calcium within an organism, which is detrimental for organism growth.

Most studies measure bioaccumulation and biodilution using the δ15N isotope of nitrogen. The δ15N isotopic signature is enriched up the food web. A predator will have a higher δ15N as compared to its prey. This trend allows the trophic position of an organism to be derived. Coupled to the concentration of a specific pollutant, such as mercury, the concentration verses trophic position can be accessed.

While most heavy metals bioaccumulate, under certain conditions, heavy metals and organic pollutants have the potential to biodilute, making a higher organism less exposed to the toxin.
