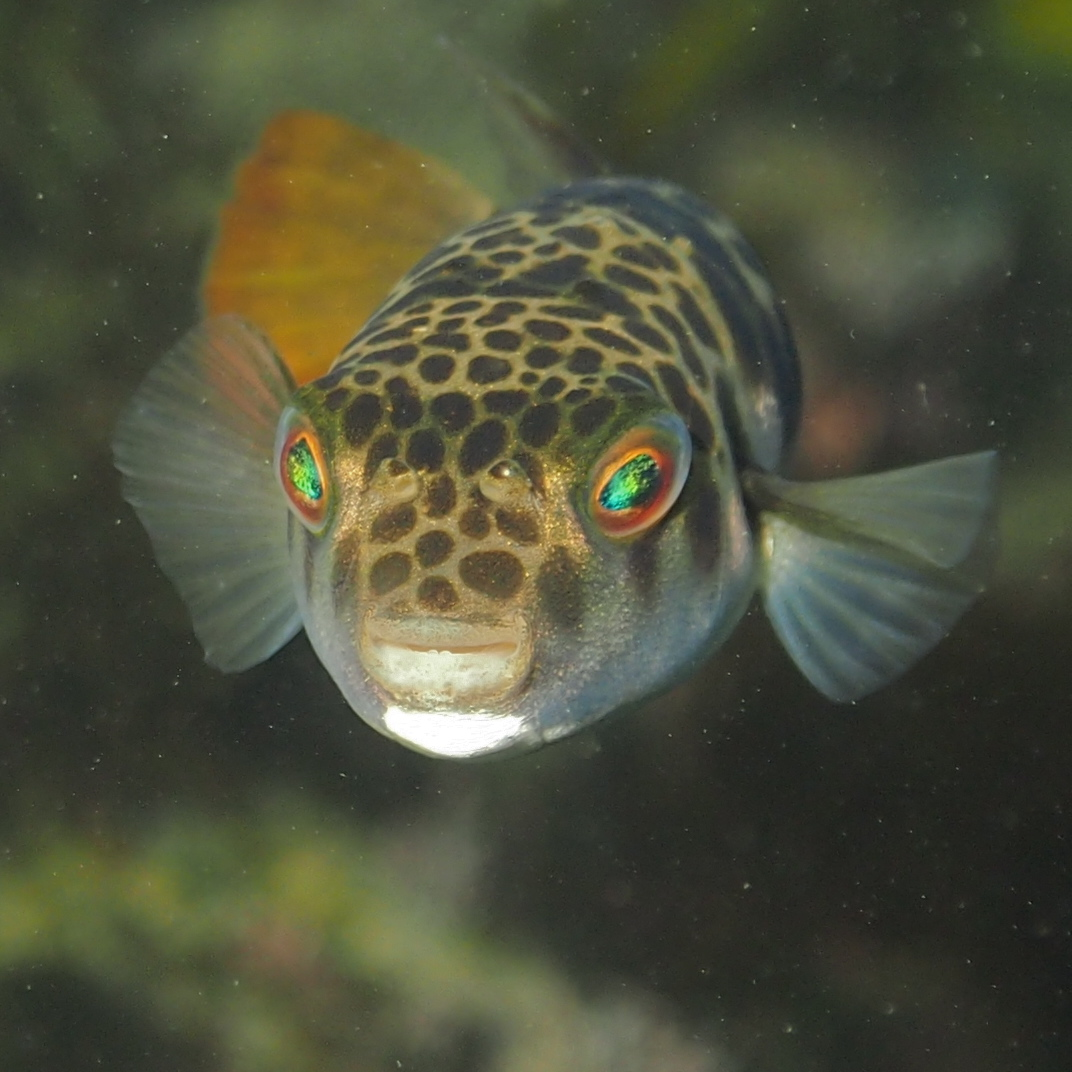

Conservation status
- Least Concern (IUCN 3.1)

Scientific classification
- Kingdom: Animalia
- Phylum: Chordata
- Class: Actinopterygii
- Division: Teleostei
- Order: Tetraodontiformes
- Family: Tetraodontidae
- Genus: Tetractenos
- Species: T. glaber

Binomial name
- Tetractenos glaber (Fréminville, 1813)
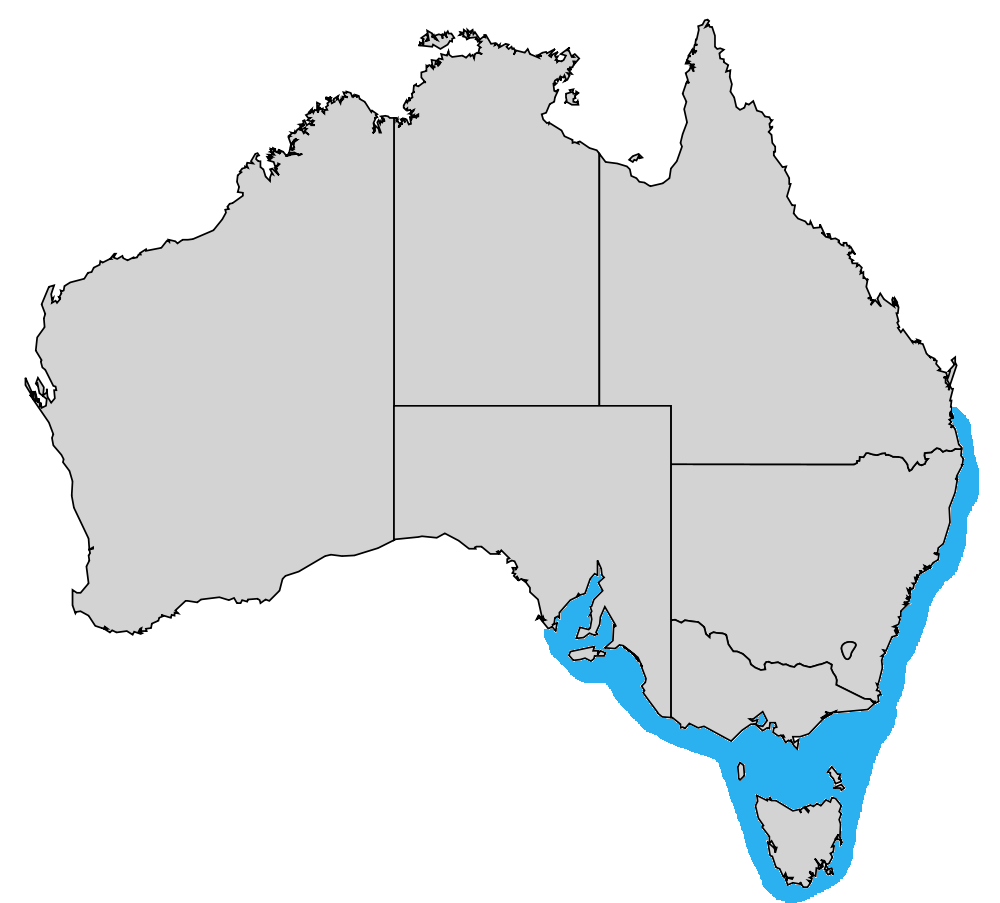
- Smooth toadfish range

Synonyms
- Tetrodon glaber Fréminville, 1813; Aphanacanthe reticulatus Bibron, 1855; Gastrophysus glaber Bleeker, 1855; Tetrodon hamiltonii Günther, 1870; Sphaeroides hamiltoni Waite, 1906; Sphaeroides liosomus Waite, 1928; Sphaeroides glaber Whitley, 1953; Aphanacanthus hamiltoni Le Danois, 1959; Amblyrhynchotes glaber Halstead, 1867; Torquigener glaber Robertson, 1980

= Smooth toadfish =

Species of fish

The smooth toadfish (Tetractenos glaber) is a species of ray-finned fish in the pufferfish family Tetraodontidae, native to shallow coastal and estuarine waters of southeastern Australia, where it is widespread and abundant. French naturalist Christophe-Paulin de La Poix de Fréminville described the species in 1813, though early records confused it with its close relative, the common toadfish (T. hamiltonii). The two species are the only members of the genus Tetractenos after going through several taxonomic changes since discovery.

Up to 16 cm (6 1/4 in) long with distinctive leopard-like dark spots on its dorsal side, the smooth toadfish has a rounded snout and tapers to a narrow tail at the back. Like other pufferfish, it can inflate itself with water or air as an anti-predator defense, but does not have prominent spines on its body (hence the name "smooth") unlike most of its relatives. It prefers and forages for molluscs and crustaceans in sand and mud of the bottom sediment. Often an unwanted catch by anglers, the smooth toadfish contains high levels of tetrodotoxin and may result in death if eaten.

== Taxonomy ==
French naturalist Christophe-Paulin de La Poix de Fréminville described the smooth toadfish in 1813 as Tetrodon glaber, based on a specimen collected in Adventure Bay in southeastern Tasmania by Claude Riche. This holotype was then catalogued in the collection of French naturalist Alexandre Brongniart, but was subsequently lost; upon his death, Brongniart's collection was bequeathed to the Paris Museum and the specimen did not appear there nor at any other institution. The specific name glaber is from the Latin adjective glăber, meaning "bald". Fréminville's description was overlooked by many subsequent authorities, resulting in the confusion of this species with the closely related common toadfish (Tetractenos hamiltoni); it is unclear with many records which species was being referred to, though those from Victoria and Tasmania belong to this species. This issue in the scientific literature was not fully resolved until 1983.

French naturalist Auguste Duméril erected a new genus in publishing the species as Aphanacanthe reticulatus in 1855 from a description authored by his countryman Gabriel Bibron, who had died suddenly. Later Latinised to Aphanacanthus, it was linked to a presumed type species Tetrodon reticulatus, from a manuscript by Bibron. In 1959, Yseult Le Danois equated this species name to Tetractenos hamiltoni, but New Zealand zoologist Graham Hardy later reviewed the specimens labelled as T. hamiltoni and found that they should be assigned to T. glaber. The genus name Aphanacanthe—not Aphanacanthus, as the original spelling takes priority—would have taken precedence over the current genus name Tetractenos. However, it is a nomen nudum as it does not provide enough detail or information to diagnose or properly describe the species, since Duméril had only written a (French) translation of the genus name—αφανης qui nе parait pas, ἃκανθα, épine ("with no thorns").

British ichthyologist Charles Tate Regan described Spheroides liosomus in 1909 from specimens collected in Melbourne, Hobart, Flinders Island and Port Phillip. He noted its lack of spines compared with specimens of T. hamiltonii, and hence argued that it was a distinct and separate species. Australian biologist Gilbert Whitley equated Regan's description with Fréminville's original naming and gave it the combination Spheroides glaber in 1955, and later Gastrophysus glaber in 1964.

The smooth toadfish was assigned to the genera Tetrodon (now Tetraodon) and Sphaeroides, both of which became wastebasket taxa. The smooth toadfish was assigned to several other genera after it became clear that it fell outside a more restricted definition of Tetr(a)odon, including Torquigener. Recognising that the smooth and common toadfish were distinct enough from other species to warrant their own genus and that no valid genus name existed, Hardy reassigned the two species to the new genus Tetractenos in 1983.

Common names include smooth toadfish, smooth toado, slimey toadfish or smooth blowie. Along with related toadfish species, the smooth toadfish is known in Australia as a "toadie". Gaguni is a Tharawal name for toadfish in the Sydney region, the word recorded by William Dawes as ca-gone in his 1791 diaries of the Sydney language.

== Description ==
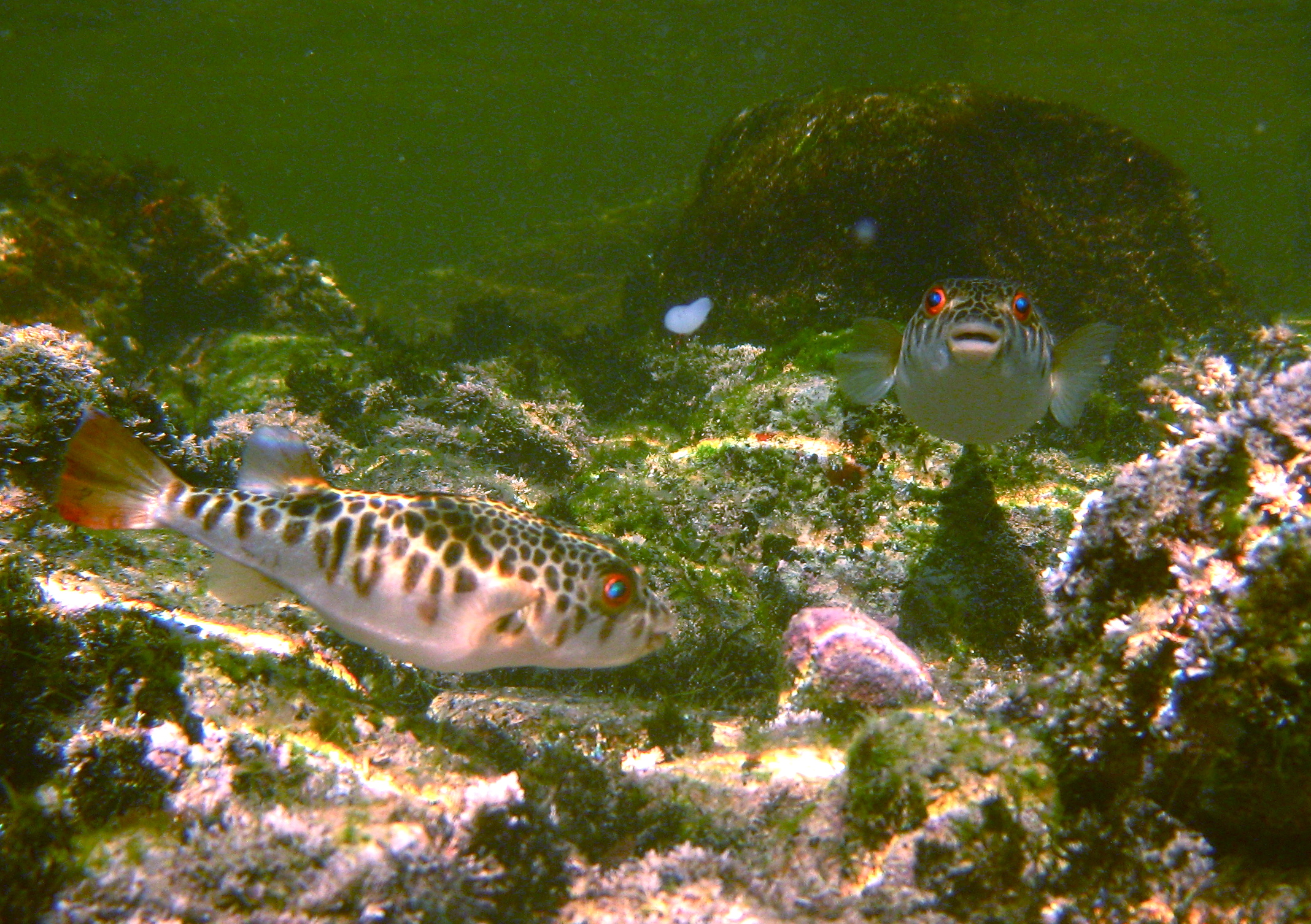
A pair of smooth toadfish (Tetractenos glaber) in New South Wales waters

With a total adult length of anywhere from 3 to 16 cm (1 1/8–6 1/4 in), the smooth toadfish has an elongate body with a rounded back and flattened belly. The body narrows posteriorly to the slender tail, and its fins are all elongate and rounded. The dorsal fin has 9 to 11 rays. The pectoral fin has 15 to 18 rays, the first of which is very short. It arises well below the level of the eye. The anal fin has 7–9 rays and caudal fin has 11. The smooth toadfish has a small mouth with thin lips at its apex and a tiny chin. The round eyes are adnate (unable to rotate), their upper border level with the profile of the back and their lower border well above the mouth. In a slightly depressed area just in front of the eyes are two small nipple-shaped structures (papillae) that are the nasal organs. The openings face to the rear of the fish and are closed by flaps attached to the walls closest to the fish's midline. The first pharyngobranchial gill arch is elongated and narrow with many tiny teeth. The smooth toadfish has tiny spines that are entirely within the skin layer; these run along its back from the nasal organs almost to the dorsal fin, and along its sides from the eye to the pectoral fine, and along its underparts from behind its mouth to its vent. The skin is smooth even when the fish is fully inflated. It swallows water or air via a flap in its throat to swell itself up.

The base colour of the upperparts is pale tan to yellow-green, heavily marked with irregular brown spots in a reticulated pattern, and several broad dark brown bands, including ones between the eyes, between the pectoral fins and at the level of the dorsal fin. Reminiscent of a leopard's spots, the reticulated pattern continues on the upper lateral side along the body of the fish, becoming silver-white on the lower lateral parts. The chin and belly are white. The fins have a faint yellow-orange tinge, more noticeably in the tail fin. Fieldwork in Sydney waters found females to be larger and heavier than males. Smooth toadfish grow steadily larger as they grow older, with one 16 cm (6 1/4 in) long individual calculated to be 13 years old from examination of its otoliths. Their gonads develop when they reach a total length of about 7–8 cm (2 3/4–3 1/8 in). The smooth toadfish can be distinguished from the otherwise similar common toadfish by its lack of spines and its larger- and bolder-patterned markings on its upperparts.

== Distribution and habitat ==
The smooth toadfish is found along Australia's eastern and southeast coast, from Moreton Bay in southeastern Queensland to Port Lincoln in South Australia as well as Kangaroo Island and Tasmania. It is one of the most abundant fishes in the muddy areas of Port Philip Bay. It generally lives in shallow water less than 3 m (10 ft) deep, often over mudflats in estuaries. In areas of seagrass beds, smooth toadfish are more commonly found in sand areas bordering on the seagrass patches. They are more commonly found in seagrass patches in water less than 1.5 m (5 ft) deep rather than deeper water of 3.5–6 m (11–20 ft). A South Australian field study on wrack and associated fauna found that the smooth toadfish was associated with larger volumes and aggregations containing green algae.

Although its movements are poorly known, tagging patterns indicate that the smooth toadfish spends most of its life cycle and reproduces in estuaries. It can venture well into freshwater past brackish areas. In 1964 a school of toadfish were found in the Lang Lang River at the South Gippsland Highway—34 km (21 mi) from Western Port Bay and well beyond tidal areas.

=== Conservation ===
Its large range, abundance and stable population mean the smooth toadfish is classified as least concern on the IUCN Red List. Although no decline in numbers has been recorded, the effects of disappearance of its habitat—mangroves and seagrass beds—is unknown.

== Breeding ==
The breeding habits of estuary-dwelling pufferfish have been little researched in general. Fieldwork in the Hawkesbury River and tributaries north of Sydney found that the smooth toadfish breeds between April and July, building up fat stores in its liver from February to April beforehand.

== Feeding ==
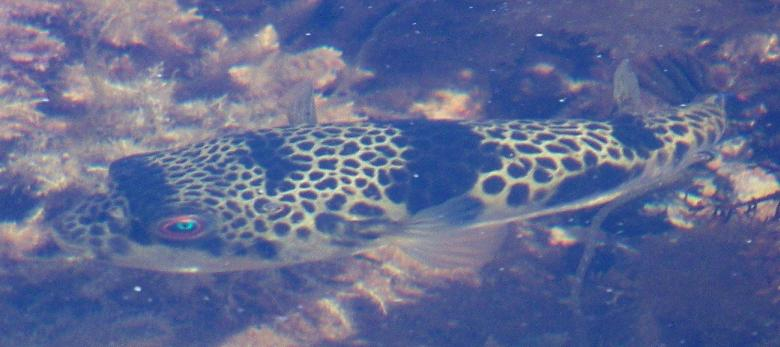
View from above, showing pattern on back (dorsum)

The smooth toadfish has strong jaws that readily crush shellfish and crustaceans. It feeds predominantly on benthic (bottom-dwelling) organisms in the substrate of the bodies of water in which it forages. Its diet includes molluscs such as black mussels, pipis, white sunset shells (Soletellina alba) and oysters (Crassostrea), crustaceans such as semaphore crabs and shrimp, and brown algae. The proportions of crustaceans to molluscs can vary widely depending on the abundance of food items; hence in a 1999 field study, the soldier crab (Mictyris longicarpus) predominated in Cowan Creek while the black mussel did so in nearby Berowra Creek. Field experiments showed it was a consumer of oysters and the gastropod Bembicium auratum, and had a major impact on their numbers.

Because it is a common estuarine fish, it has been used in studies of heavy metal contamination in coastal waters. Fish tested around Sydney showed uptake was highest in the gonads, then muscle, gills and liver. It is unclear why metal concentrations were lower in toadfish livers (compared with studies of contamination in other fish) but their liver cells may be more effective at removing these elements. Lead, cadmium and nickel levels corresponded with those in the sediment from which the fish were taken, suggesting dietary intake. The gonads of male fish had twenty times as much arsenic as those of females, while the gills of female fish contained thirty times as much lead as those of males. Raised levels of arsenic, cobalt, cadmium and lead in gills suggested the fish absorbed these from the surrounding water. An experiment exposing smooth toadfish to radioactive cadmium and selenium in either food or water found that cadmium in food was taken up in and excreted by the liver, while cadmium in water was taken up in the gut lining and excreted in liver, gills and kidney, indicating the fish were consuming a lot of water. Selenium was taken up in the gills, kidneys and liver regardless of whether it was in food or water. Fieldwork in Sydney waterways showed that higher arsenic, lead, cadmium and cobalt corresponded with decreased lipid levels in liver and gonadal tissue, and raised cobalt and nickel correspond to increased protein levels in muscle, liver and gonadal tissue. Raised lead levels were consistent with smaller egg size. A study of asymmetry of fish bones in smooth toadfish in various parts of Sydney and Hawkesbury River estuaries showed a relationship between exposure to organochlorine pesticides but not heavy metals, indicating the finding may correlate to stress from organic toxicity.

== Toxicity ==
Notorious for taking bait from fish hooks, the smooth toadfish is an unwanted catch for anglers as its flesh is highly poisonous and unfit for human consumption. Its lack of spines makes it easier to handle than other toadfish when it inflates itself after being caught. Its toxicity had been reported by local Aboriginal people in Sydney to William Dawes in the late 18th century. A man named John Buff was fatally poisoned after catching and eating toadfish in Duck River in 1821 near Parramatta; his case and subsequent coroner's inquest were published in The Sydney Gazette. The smooth toadfish was responsible for the deaths of the wife and two children of Captain Bell of New Town near Hobart in a widely publicised case in March 1831. Colonial surgeon James Scott wrote,

The melancholy and dreadful effect produced by eating it was lately instanced in the neighbourhood of Hobart town ... The poison is of a powerful sedative nature, producing stupor, loss of speech, deglutition, vision and the power of the voluntary muscles, and ultimately an entire deprivation of nervous power and death.

An inquest into the deaths took place on 29 March 1831. The family's three servants, one of whom appeared to have been poisoned as well and was ill, were placed in custody separately to stop them communicating with each other while the investigation proceeded. The jury replicated the effects by feeding the fish to (and poisoning) two cats. The jury learnt that the servant, Speed, had caught the 20 or so fish and taken them home to eat. A neighbour called out to him not to eat the fish as they were "no good", but he took it as a joke. The inquest concluded with a finding of accidental death, with some deliberation over whether Speed should have been charged with manslaughter or even murder after hearing the warning. Warnings about toadfish were subsequently issued.

Its toxicity is due to tetrodotoxin, which is concentrated particularly in the liver, ovaries, intestines and skin. Many species of pufferfish bear this toxin, obtaining it from tetrodotoxin-containing bacteria in their diet. Eating the fish can have fatal consequences. The symptoms of poisoning, which are predominantly neurological, include ataxia, in addition to numbness and/or paraesthesia (tingling) around the mouth, lips, and limb extremities. Cases of pets being poisoned have occurred when the fish have been left where they can eat them.
