= Soletellina alba =

Scientific classification
- Kingdom: Animalia
- Phylum: Mollusca
- Class: Bivalvia
- Order: Cardiida
- Family: Psammobiidae
- Genus: Soletellina
- Species: S. alba

Binomial name
- Soletellina alba (Lamarck, 1818)

Synonyms
- Psammobia alba Lamarck, 1818

Species of bivalve

Soletellina alba, commonly known as the white sunset shell, is a bivalve mollusc of the family Psammobiidae native to much of coastal Australia.
