= Biomagnification =

Process of progressive accumulation in food chain

Biomagnification is a process causing the concentration of a substance (crosses) to increase at higher levels of the food chain.

In this scenario, a pond has been contaminated with toxic waste. Further up the food chain, the concentration of the contaminant increases, sometimes resulting in the top consumer dying.

Biomagnification, also known as bioamplification or biological magnification, is the increase in concentration of a substance in the tissues of organisms at successively higher levels in a food chain.

Biomagnification is the buildup of concentration of a substance (x) in a food chain. For example the DDT concentration in parts per million increases with trophic level. Concentrations build up in organism's fat and tissue. Predators accumulate higher levels than prey.

Biological magnification often refers to the process whereby substances such as pesticides or heavy metals work their way into lakes, rivers and the ocean, and then move up the food chain in progressively greater concentrations as they are incorporated into the diet of aquatic organisms such as zooplankton, which in turn are eaten perhaps by fish, which then may be eaten by bigger fish, large birds, animals, or humans. The substances become increasingly concentrated in tissues or internal organs as they move up the chain.

== Processes ==
Although sometimes used interchangeably with "bioaccumulation", an important distinction is drawn between the two, and with bioconcentration.

- Bioaccumulation occurs within a trophic level, and is the increase in the concentration of a substance in certain tissues of organisms' bodies due to absorption from food and the environment.
- Bioconcentration is defined as occurring when uptake from the water is greater than excretion.

Thus, bioconcentration and bioaccumulation occur within an organism, and biomagnification occurs across trophic (food chain) levels.

Biodilution is also a process that occurs to all trophic levels in an aquatic environment; it is the opposite of biomagnification, thus when a pollutant gets smaller in concentration as it progresses up a food web.

Many chemicals that bioaccumulate are highly soluble in fats (lipophilic) and insoluble in water (hydrophobic).

For example, though mercury is only present in small amounts in seawater, it is absorbed by algae (generally as methylmercury). Methylmercury is one of the most harmful mercury molecules. It is efficiently absorbed, but only very slowly excreted by organisms. Bioaccumulation and bioconcentration result in buildup in the adipose tissue of successive trophic levels: zooplankton, small nekton, larger fish, etc. Anything which eats these fish also consumes the higher level of mercury the fish have accumulated. This process explains why predatory fish such as swordfish and sharks or birds like osprey and eagles have higher concentrations of mercury in their tissue than could be accounted for by direct exposure alone. For example, herring contains mercury at approximately 0.01 parts per million (ppm) and shark contains mercury at greater than 1 ppm.

DDT is a pesticide known to biomagnify, which is one of the most significant reasons it was deemed harmful to the environment by the EPA and other organizations. DDT is one of the least soluble chemicals known and accumulates progressively in adipose tissue, and as the fat is consumed by predators, the amounts of DDT biomagnify. A well known example of the harmful effects of DDT biomagnification is the significant decline in North American populations of predatory birds such as bald eagles and peregrine falcons due to DDT causing eggshell thinning in the 1950s. DDT is now a banned substance in many parts of the world.

== Quantification ==
Biomagnification is quantified using two complementary parameters:

=== Biomagnification factor ===
The biomagnification factor (BMF) describes the ratio of the contaminant concentration in a predator to the concentration in its prey once a steady state is reached. The BMF is dimensionless and is used particularly when the direct uptake of contaminants from water is difficult (such as with highly lipophilic substances). A BMF > 1 indicates that the contaminant accumulates more strongly in the feeding organism than in its feed. BMFs are typically determined through laboratory studies with controlled feeding or through field observations and allow for the direct measurement of the transfer process between trophic levels.

=== Trophic magnification factor ===
The trophic magnification factor (TMF) offers a more comprehensive perspective by quantifying biomagnification across an entire food web. The TMF is calculated by plotting the logarithm of the contaminant concentration against the trophic level of various organism groups; the TMF then corresponds to the antilogarithm of the regression slope. A TMF > 1 indicates biomagnification, while a TMF < 1 indicates trophic dilution. The TMF is derived from field studies and thus allows for an examination of real food web structures and ecosystem dynamics.

== Current status ==
In a review, a large number of studies, Suedel et al. concluded that although biomagnification is probably more limited in occurrence than previously thought, there is good evidence that DDT, DDE, PCBs, toxaphene, and the organic forms of mercury and arsenic do biomagnify in nature. For other contaminants, bioconcentration and bioaccumulation account for their high concentrations in organism tissues. More recently, Gray reached a similar substances remaining in the organisms and not being diluted to non-threatening concentrations. The success of top predatory-bird recovery (bald eagles, peregrine falcons) in North America following the ban on DDT use in agriculture is testament to the importance of recognizing and responding to biomagnification.

== Substances that biomagnify ==
Two common groups that are known to biomagnify are chlorinated hydrocarbons, also known as organochlorines, and heavy metals, including organometallic forms like methylmercury. Both are lipophilic and not easily degraded. Novel organic substances like organochlorines are not easily degraded because organisms lack previous exposure and have thus not evolved specific detoxification and excretion mechanisms, as there has been no selection pressure from them. These substances are consequently known as "persistent organic pollutants" or POPs.

Metals are not degradable because they are chemical elements. Organisms, particularly those subject to naturally high levels of exposure to metals, have mechanisms to sequester and excrete metals. Problems arise when organisms are exposed to higher concentrations than usual, which they cannot excrete rapidly enough to prevent damage. Persistent heavy metals, such as lead, cadmium, mercury, and arsenic, can have a wide variety of adverse health effects across species.

=== Novel organic substances ===
- DDT (dichlorodiphenyltrichloroethane)
- Hexachlorobenzene (HCB)
- Monomethylmercury
- PCBs (polychlorinated biphenyls)
- Toxaphene

== See also ==
- Dichlorodiphenyldichloroethylene
- Mercury in fish
