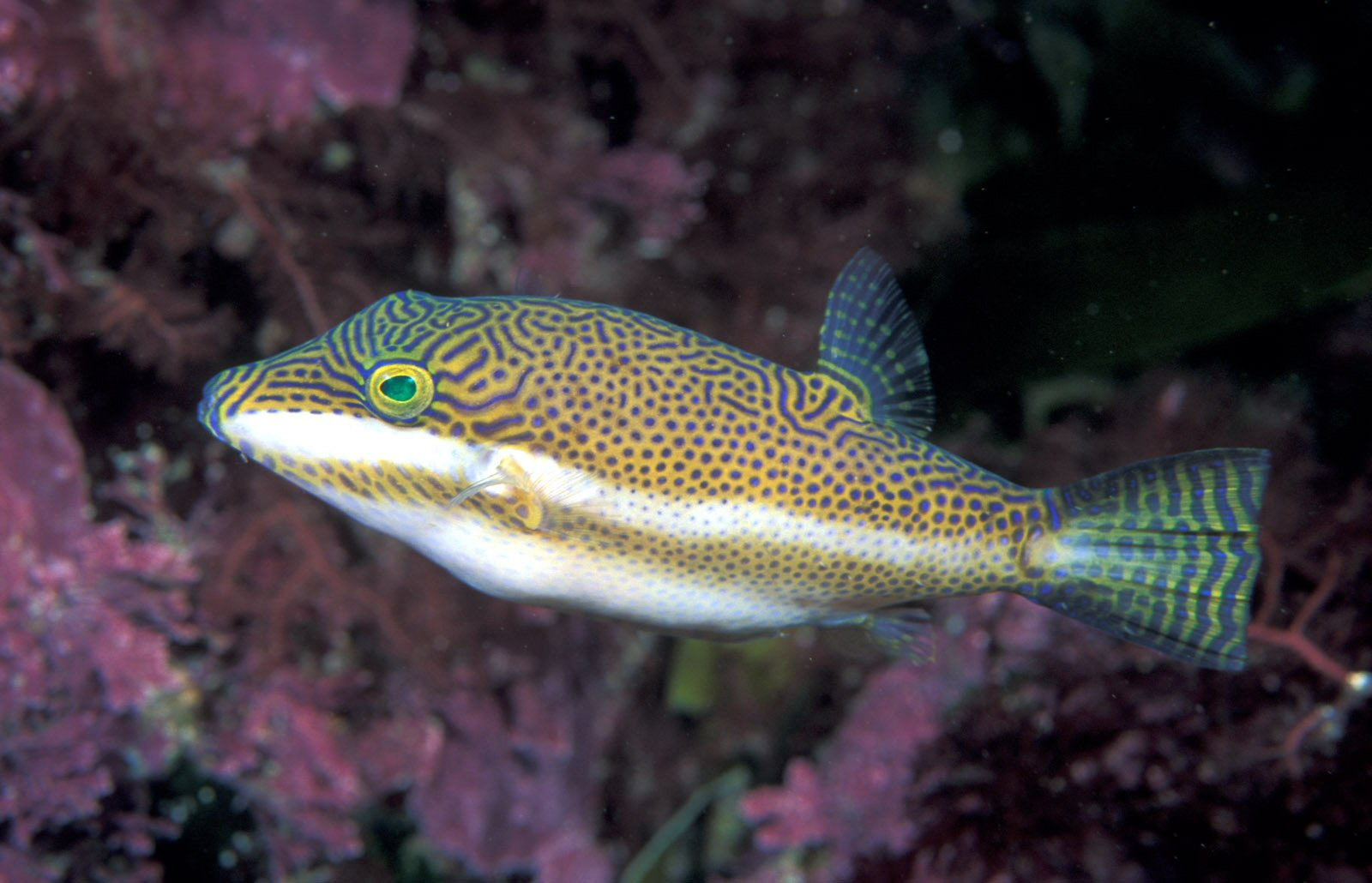

Conservation status
- Least Concern (IUCN 3.1)

Scientific classification
- Kingdom: Animalia
- Phylum: Chordata
- Class: Actinopterygii
- Order: Tetraodontiformes
- Family: Tetraodontidae
- Genus: Canthigaster
- Species: C. callisterna

Binomial name
- Canthigaster callisterna (J. D. Ogilby, 1889)

= Clown toado =

Clown toado Canthigaster callisterna

Species of fish

The clown toado (Canthigaster callisterna) a pufferfish of the genus Canthigaster, is found in the southwest Pacific Ocean including Australia, the northeast coast of New Zealand, and New Caledonia. Its length is between 10 and 20 cm.

The clown toado, like other puffers, is highly poisonous.
