= Christophe-Paulin de La Poix de Fréminville =

French Navy Commander, naturalist, archeologist and pioneer of transvestism

Christophe-Paulin de La Poix chevalier de Fréminville
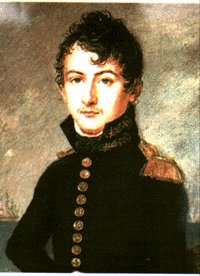
- Portrait of Christophe-Paulin de La Poix de Fréminville
- Born: 24 January 1787; Ivry, France
- Died: 12 January 1848 (aged 60); Brest, France
- Military career
- Allegiance: France
- Branch: French navy
- Service years: 1801–1831
- Rank: knight
- Nickname: La Chevalière (Note: "Chevalière" is the French term for "signet ring", but can also be understood as the female form of "chevalier" ("knight").)
- Conflicts: Raids on Boulogne
- Awards: Order of Saint-Louis; Sovereign Military Order of Malta
- Other work: Archeological and natural history works.

Christophe-Paulin de La Poix, chevalier de Fréminville (French pronunciation: [kʁistɔf polɛ̃ də la pwa də fʁemɛ̃vil]; 24 January 1787 – 12 January 1848) was a French Navy Commander, naturalist, archeologist and pioneer of transvestism.

== Career ==
La Poix de Fréminville was born to a family of naval engineers, and joined the Navy in 1801. He served as an aide to Rear-Admiral Latouche-Tréville and distinguished himself on the gunboat Etna during Nelson's Raids on Boulogne.

At the age of 15, Fréminville was appointed to the 74-gun Intrépide as a midshipman and took part in the Saint-Domingue expedition, in which he witnessed and condemned the massacres perpetrated by General de Rochambeau.

Returned to France in January 1803 on Swiftsure with Pauline Bonaparte and the body of General Leclerc, he was promoted to Ensign, and distinguished himself again in a battle between his gunboat and a British frigate, where he was wounded.

In 1806, he was appointed to the frigate Sirène on which he took part in a naval division under Captain Amand Leduc, also comprising the frigates Guerrière and Revanche, and sent near the North Pole to prey on British whalers. During the campaign, he served as signals major, adjudant to the division, and hydrographer. He notably rediscovered the island of Enckuysen, which Bellin had placed at 65°N 12°W in maps in 1751 and 1767 and whose existence had been doubted, but which were spotted at 65°54'N 12°48'W. (Note: The island was suppressed from maps in 1854. (Levot, p. 196).)

The frigates sailed up to Spitsbergen, capturing a number of prizes, and returned to Iceland, where Fréminville measured several point of the coast. The squadron then cruised off Ireland and returned to France in September 1807, except Guerrière, captured by HMS Blanche on 19 July 1806.

Seeing little action in the seven following years, Fréminville achieved the rank of Lieutenant only in 1811. A royalist at heart, he welcomed the Bourbon Restoration, but his career did not accelerate; he served on the fluyt Rhône in the Baltic Sea and the frigate Néréide off Western Africa.

In mid-1822, Néréide was in the Caribbean, and Fréminville fell in love with a Creole girl named "Caroline C." at the Îles des Saintes; Néréide was sent to Martinique and then to Guadeloupe meanwhile sailed along the coast of Saintes without stopping with Fréminville aboard. Caroline was misled, thinking that her lover was heading to Europe and would never return, and she committed suicide.

In 1824, Fréminville took command of the fluyt Bonite. The year after, he commanded the fluyt Adour in America. Constantly performing archeology and natural history surveys, he requested in vain command of an exploration mission. It was not until 1827 that he was promoted to Commander. In 1829, Fréminville was appointed to evaluate a chip log invented by Pierre Bouguer, which he deemed unsuitable.

Fréminville retired from the Navy in 1831. The same year, he pseudonymously authored an "Essay on the physical and moral influence of the female costume", (Note: "Essai sur l'influence physique et morale du costume féminin ".) in which he stated that female clothes

have a delicious effect on the nervous system of a delicate being and make it undergo inner delights unknown to those whose organisation is more coarse (Note: "... agissent délicieusement sur le système nerveux d'un être délicat et lui font éprouver intérieurement des jouissances inconnues à ceux dont l'organisation est plus grossière ".)

The pseudonym "Caroline de L." that Fréminville used was later interpreted as a hommage to the Creole of the Saintes.

In his later years, he devoted himself to archeology and natural history, and his credited with founding the archeology of Lower Brittany. In 1836, he donated a luxurious model of a fictitious galley, Minerve, made by famed modelist Augustin Pic, to the Musée national de la Marine. He died on 12 January 1848.

Zoological drawings by Fréminville
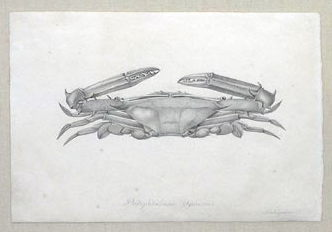
Podophtalmus Spinolis

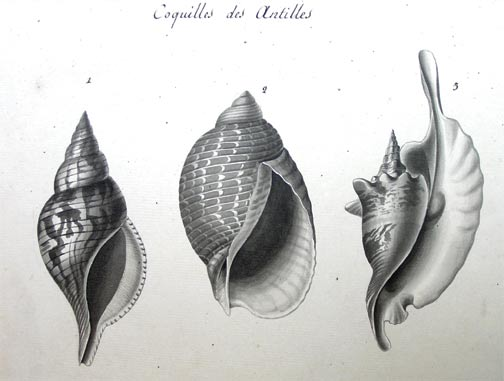
Shell from the Caribbean

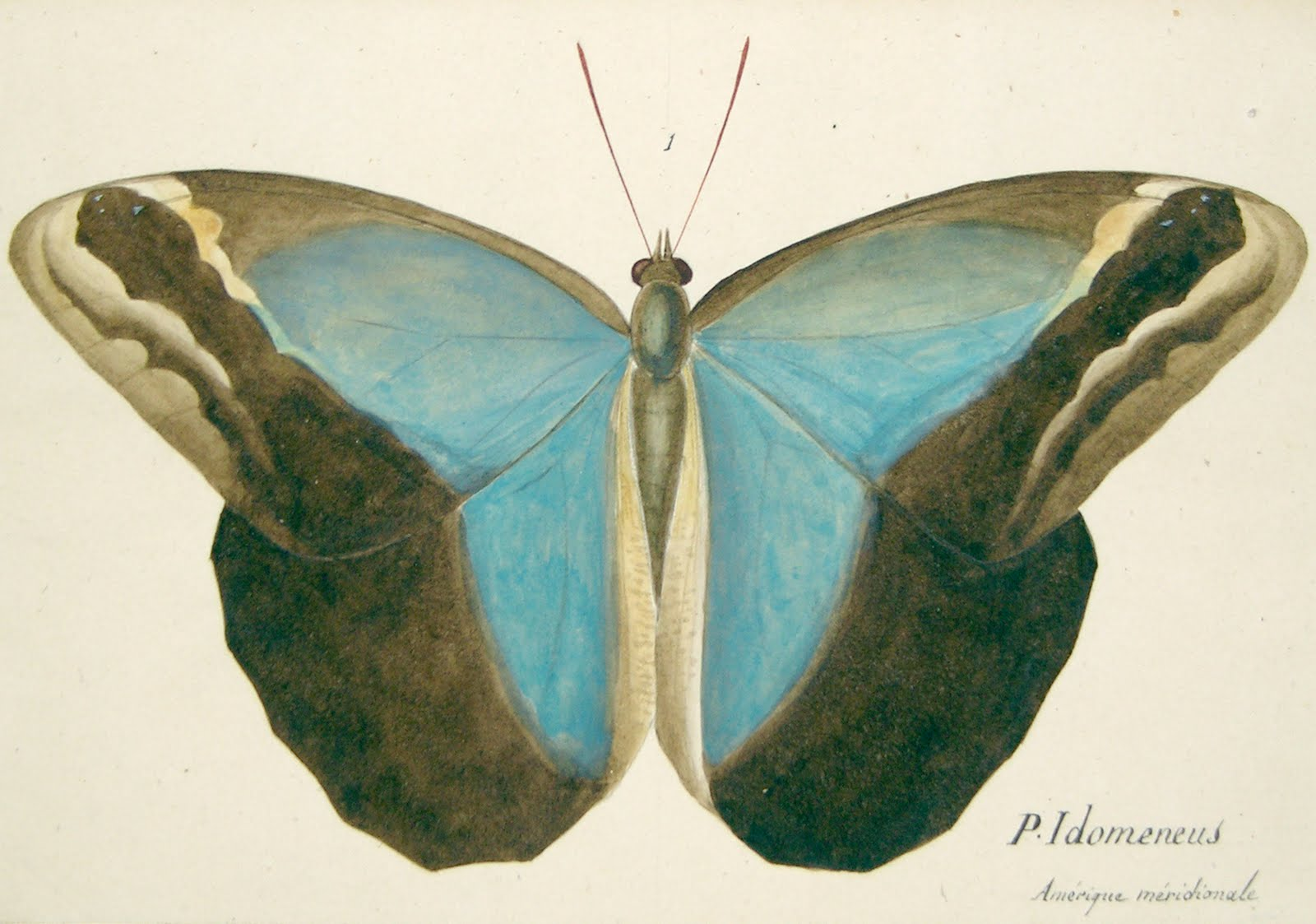
Caligo idomeneus

== Honours ==
- Knight of the Order of Saint-Louis
- Knight of the Sovereign Military Order of Malta

== Legacy ==
Fréminville is commemorated in the scientific name of a species of Central American snake, Stenorrhina freminvillei.

== Works ==
- La Poix-Fréminville, Christophe-Paulin (1819). Le combat des Trente, poème du XIVème siècle, transcrit (in French). Brest: Lefournier et Deperiers.
- La Poix-Fréminville, Christophe-Paulin (1819). Voyage to the North Pole. Sir R. Phillips and Company.
- La Poix-Fréminville, Christophe-Paulin (1829). Antiquités de la Bretagne. Monuments du Morbihan (in French). Brest: Lefournier et Deperiers.
- Bajot, Louis Marin (1829). Abrégé historique et chronologique des principaux voyages de découverte par mer, depuis l'an 2000 avant J.-C (in French). Paris: Imprimerie Royale. (pseudonymous work)
- L..., née de L. P..., Caroline (1831). Essai sur l'influence physique et morale du costume féminin (PDF) (in French). Paris: Imprimerie de Stahl. (pseudonymous work)
- La Poix-Fréminville, Christophe-Paulin (1832). Antiquités de la Bretagne. Finistère (PDF) (in French). Vol. 1. Brest: Lefournier et Deperiers.
- La Poix-Fréminville, Christophe-Paulin (1835). Antiquités de la Bretagne. Finistère (in French). Vol. 2. Brest: Lefournier et Deperiers. ISBN 9781179179704.
- La Poix-Fréminville, Christophe-Paulin (1837). Antiquités de la Bretagne : Côtes-du-Nord (in French). Brest: J.B. Lefournier.
- La Poix-Fréminville, Christophe-Paulin (1834). Antiquités de la Bretagne: monumens du Morbihan (in French). Brest: J.B. Lefournier.
- La Poix de Fréminville, Christophe-Paulin (1841). Histoire de Bertrand Du Guesclin (in French). Brest: A. Proux & Cie.

== Notes and references ==
=== Bibliography ===
- Beolens, Bo; Watkins, Michael; Grayson, Michael (2011). The Eponym Dictionary of Reptiles. Baltimore: Johns Hopkins University Press. xiii + 296 pp. ISBN 978-1-4214-0135-5.
- Levot, Prosper (1866). Les gloires maritimes de la France: notices biographiques sur les plus célèbres marins (in French). Bertrand.
- Herpin, Eugène; La Poix-Fréminville, Christophe-Paulin (1913). Mémoires du Chevalier de Fréminville (1787–1848) (in French). Paris: Librairie ancienne H. Champion.
- Mac Carthy, Jacques W. (1823). Choix de voyages dans les quatre parties du Monde (in French). Librairie nationale et étrangère.
- Fonds Marine. Campagnes (opérations; divisions et stations navales; missions diverses). Inventaire de la sous-série Marine BB4. Tome premier : BB4 1 à 482 (1790–1826)

== Taxon described by him ==
- See Category:Taxa named by Christophe-Paulin de La Poix de Fréminville
