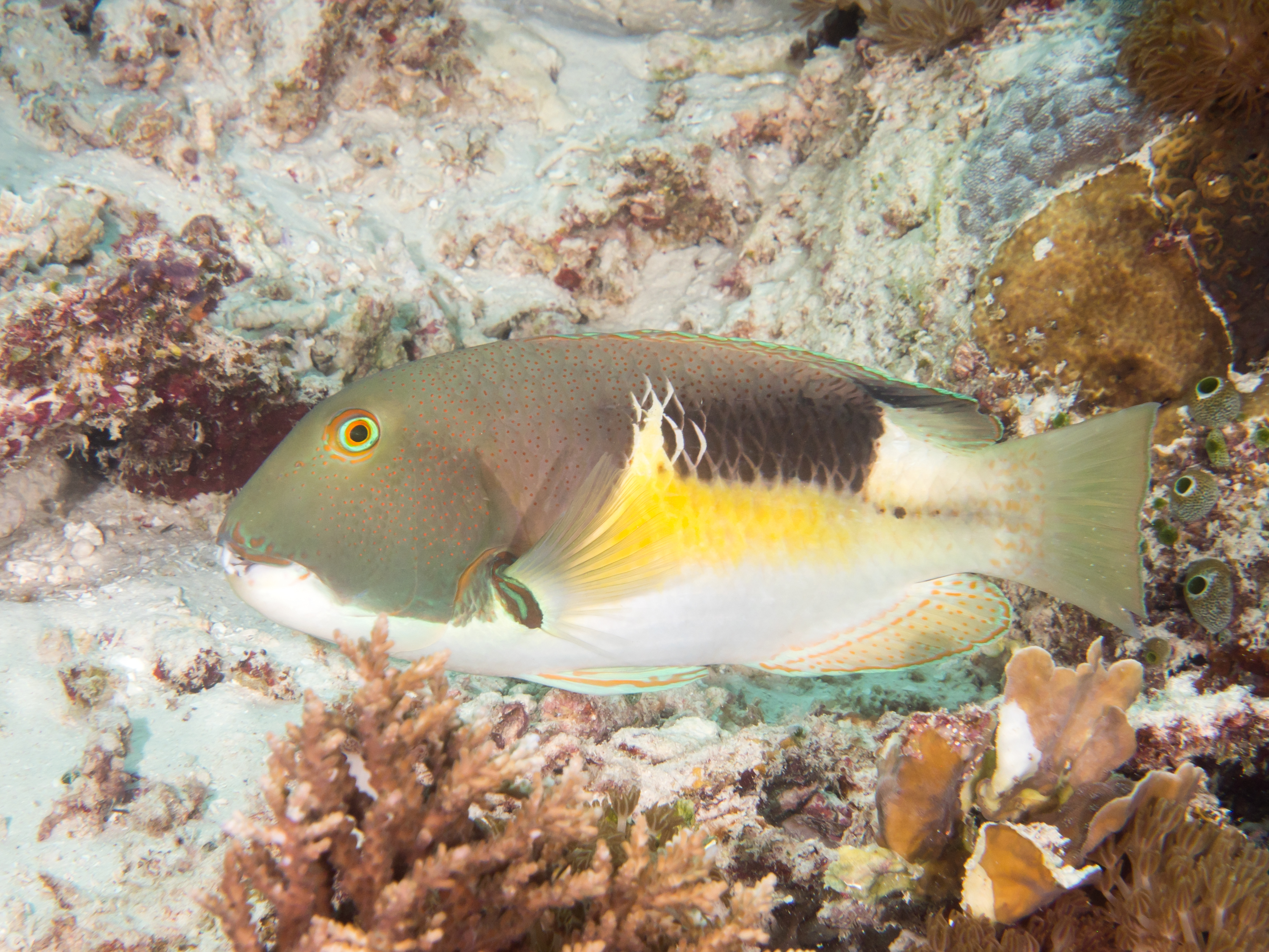

Conservation status
- Least Concern (IUCN 3.1)

Scientific classification
- Kingdom: Animalia
- Phylum: Chordata
- Class: Actinopterygii
- Order: Labriformes
- Family: Labridae
- Genus: Choerodon
- Species: C. anchorago

Binomial name
- Choerodon anchorago (Bloch, 1791)

Synonyms
- List: Sparus anchorago Bloch, 1791; Labrus macrodontus Lacépède, 1801; Cossyphus macrodon Bleeker, 1849; Choerops meleagris Rüppell, 1852; Labrus chlorodus Gronow, 1854; Crenilabrus leucozona Bleeker, 1858; Choerops maeander Cartier, 1874; Choerodon weberi Ogilby, 1911

= Orange-dotted tuskfish =

Species of fish

The orange-dotted tuskfish (Choerodon anchorago) is a species of wrasse native to the Indo-Pacific region from Sri Lanka in the west to French Polynesia in the east. Its range extends north to the Ryukyu Islands and south to New Caledonia. It inhabits reefs at depths from 1 to 25 m (3.3–82.0 ft). This species can reach a length of 50 cm (20 in).

== Potential tool use ==
An orange-dotted tuskfish named Percy starred in the first episode of BBC's Blue Planet II. Filmed at the Great Barrier Reef, Percy, who was female at the time, was filmed repeatedly breaking open clams by carrying them to a specific group of hard coral termed by filmmakers as a 'castle', and then striking the clams against a specific patch on the coral until they crack. The same behavior has been documented in individuals from Palau, and similar behavior have been recorded in the related blackspot tuskfish and a few other wrasse species. This is potentially a form of tool use by animals.

== Relationship with humans ==
The orange-dotted tuskfish is commercially important (it is found in markets in China, for example), and can be found in the aquarium trade.

== Gallery ==
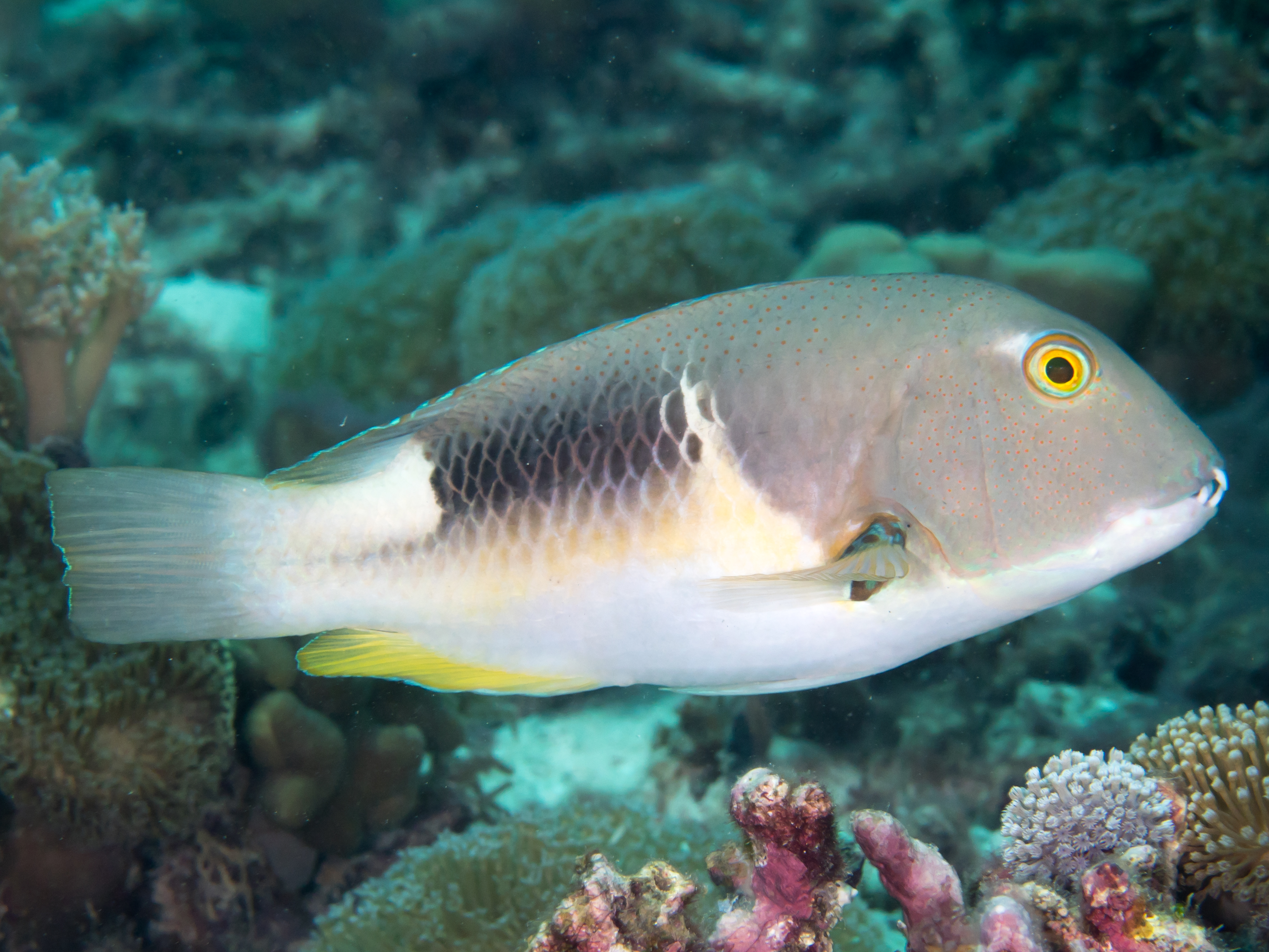
At Raja Ampat, Indonesia

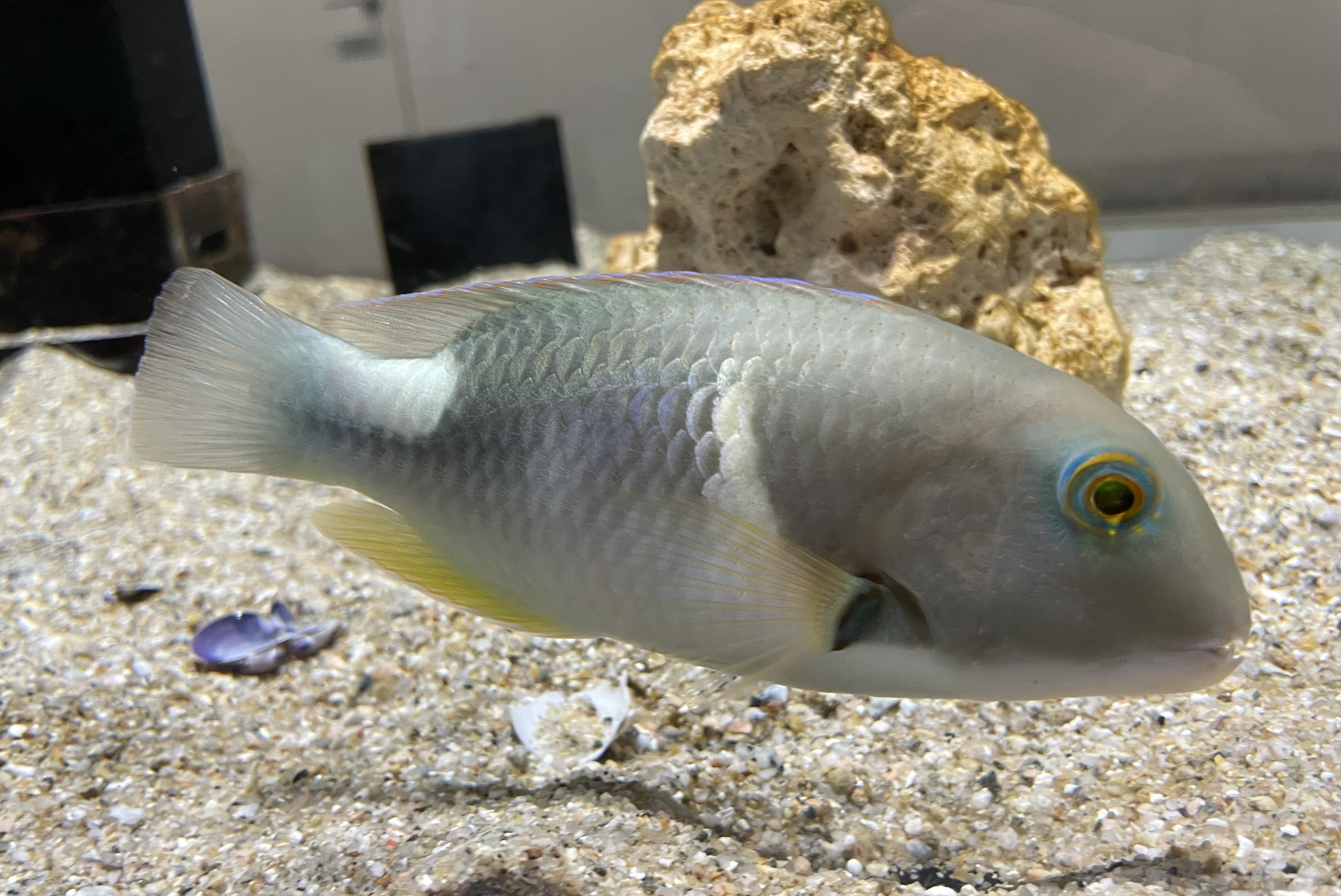
Juvenile, in captivity

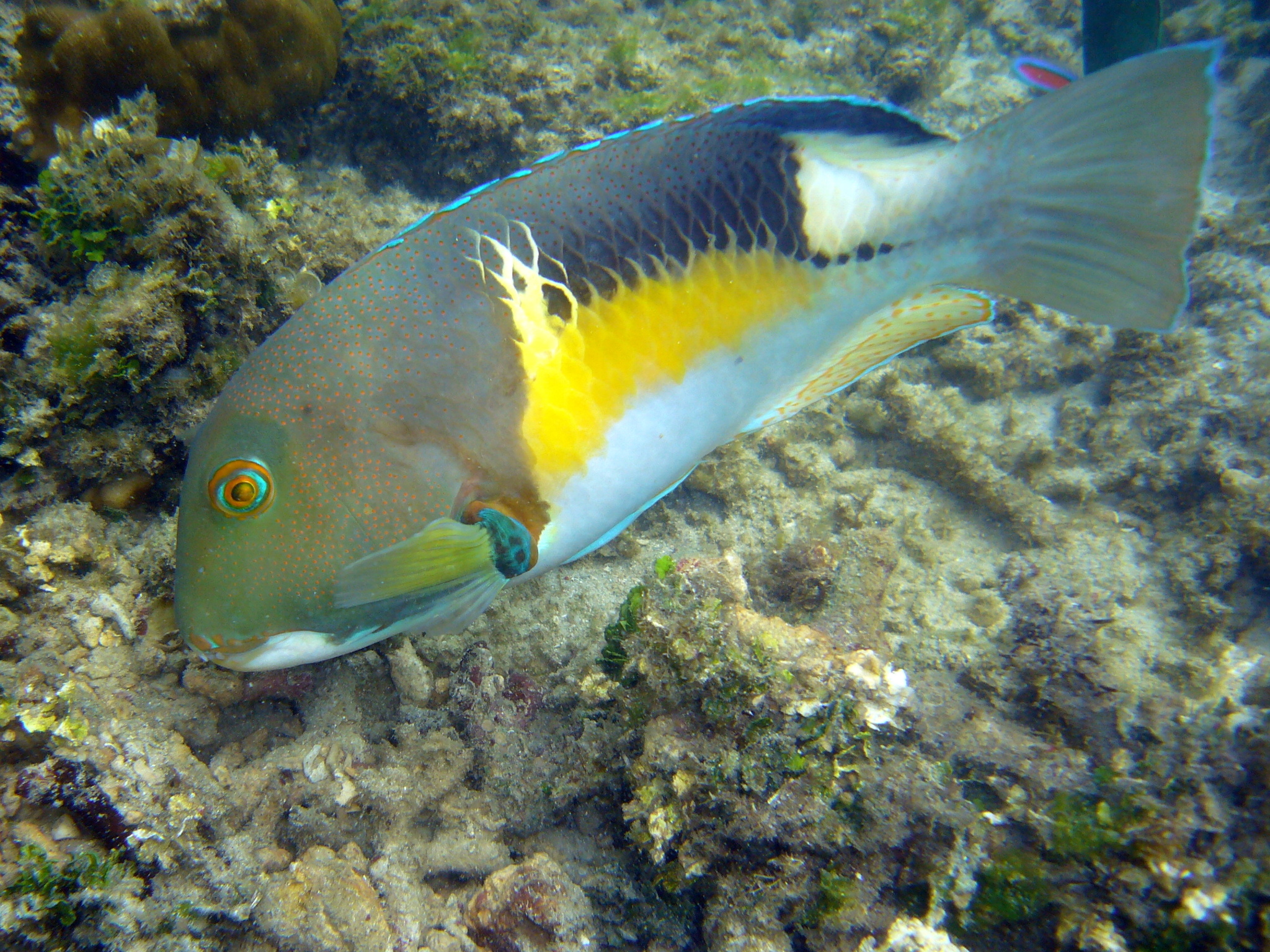
At Sipadan, Malaysia

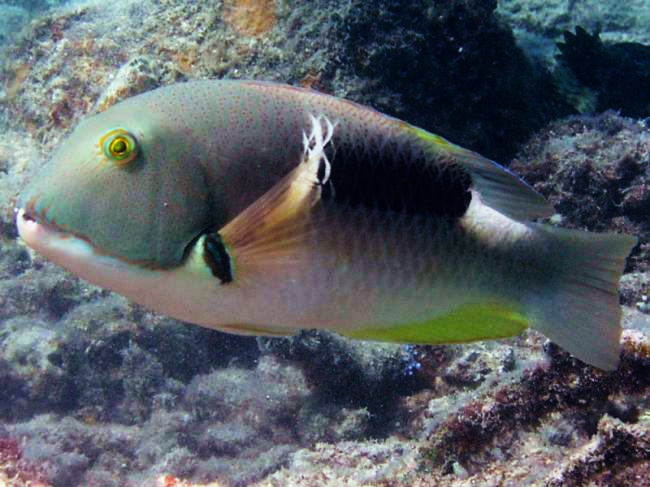
