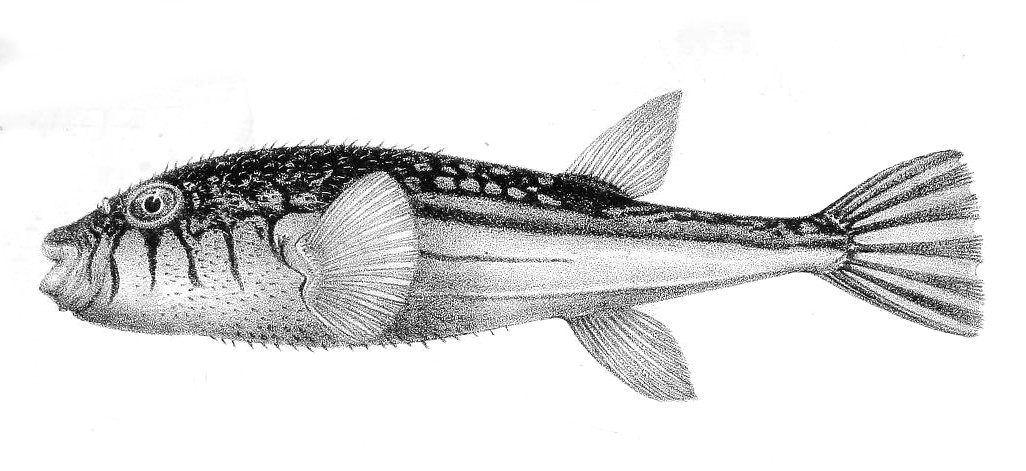

Scientific classification
- Domain: Eukaryota
- Kingdom: Animalia
- Phylum: Chordata
- Class: Actinopterygii
- Order: Tetraodontiformes
- Family: Tetraodontidae
- Genus: Torquigener
- Species: T. pleurogramma

Binomial name
- Torquigener pleurogramma Regan, 1903
- Natural range of the weeping toadfish

Synonyms
- Spheroides pleurogramma Spheroides lacrimosus Waite, 1923

= Torquigener pleurogramma =

Species of fish

Torquigener pleurogramma, commonly known as the weeping toadfish or blowie, is a species of fish in the family Tetraodontidae. It is found in the coastal waters of Australia. Its flesh is highly toxic.

Charles Tate Regan described the species in 1903. Early records in Australian waters of the orange-spotted toadfish (T. hypselogeneion) refer to the weeping toadfish. Other common names for T. pleurogramma include banded toadfish and common blowfish.

Reaching 22 cm (8.7 in) in length, T. pleurogramma has an elongated body with a rounded back and flattened belly. It has a small mouth, with thin lips at its apex, and a tiny chin. It has dense, sturdy spines from its nose to halfway between its pectoral and dorsal fins. It has greyish or greenish upperparts dotted with lighter and darker dots and dark bands. Its chin is yellowish, and belly is white. A dark-brown stripe runs from the base of the pectoral fin to the tail fin along the fish's sides. Several dark lines run vertically down its cheeks that give the fish a "weeping" appearance. Its corneas turn yellow in bright light.

It can be distinguished from the orange-spotted toadfish (which is not found in Australian waters) by its more prominent spines.

Its range is from Hervey Bay in central Queensland to Narooma in southern New South Wales on Australia's east coast, and from Adelaide around to Coral Bay in Western Australia. It is found off Lord Howe Island, but not Tasmania. It lives in shallow salt water and can gather around jetties and piers. It can be found to depths of 27 m (89 ft).

Schools may form in deeper coastal waters during summer, moving from their estuarine habitat and perhaps dying out en masse during autumn. The species is known to attack divers in large numbers, like the silver pufferfish Lagocephalus sceleratus, but they are not able to inflict large bites.

Domestic animals, such as dogs are especially vulnerable to poisoning by the flesh of this species.

== Reproduction ==
T. pleurogramma is a schooling species that can live for up to six years. They reach sexual maturity by the end of their second year, at around 125 mm. Spawning likely occurs in aggregations just outside estuaries, with peak activity in mid-summer.

Juveniles, about 50 mm in length, enter estuaries in large numbers during July and August, coinciding with peak freshwater discharge. The eggs are demersal, while young fry are pelagic and transition to juveniles at 5–10 mm in length.

== Conservation ==
T. pleurogramma is listed on the IUCN Red List as LC (Least Concern).
