= Torquigener altipinnis =

Scientific classification
- Kingdom: Animalia
- Phylum: Chordata
- Class: Actinopterygii
- Order: Tetraodontiformes
- Family: Tetraodontidae
- Genus: Torquigener
- Species: T. altipinnis

Binomial name
- Torquigener altipinnis J. D. Ogilby, 1891

Species of fish

Torquigener altipinnis, the highfin toadfish, is a species of fish in the family Tetraodontidae. It is found in the coastal waters off eastern Australia, from southeast Queensland to Malabar, New South Wales, as well as Norfolk, Lord Howe and Raoul Islands.
