= Torquigener marleyi =

Conservation status
- Data Deficient (IUCN 3.1)

Scientific classification
- Kingdom: Animalia
- Phylum: Chordata
- Class: Actinopterygii
- Order: Tetraodontiformes
- Family: Tetraodontidae
- Genus: Torquigener
- Species: T. marleyi

Binomial name
- Torquigener marleyi (Fowler, 1929)

Synonyms
- Sphoeroides marleyi Fowler, 1929 (basionym); Sphaeroides marleyi

Species of pufferfish

Torquigener marleyi is a species of pufferfish in the family Tetraodontidae. It is a marine species known only from South Africa, where it occurs near the Tugela River in KwaZulu-Natal. However, its taxonomic validity is unclear: FishBase considers this species as a synonym of Torquigener balteus, whereas IUCN calls for more studies on its taxonomy.
