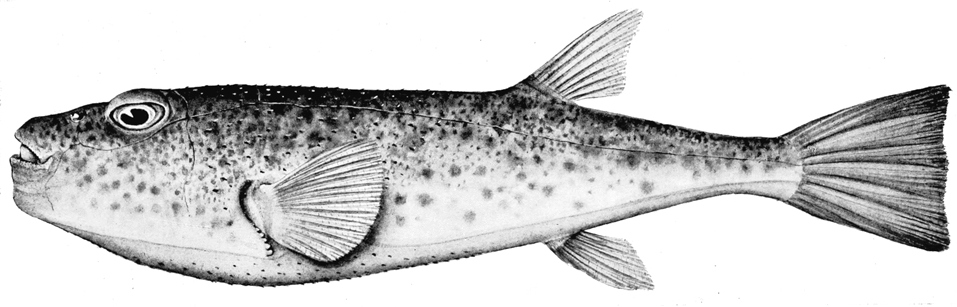

Scientific classification
- Kingdom: Animalia
- Phylum: Chordata
- Class: Actinopterygii
- Order: Tetraodontiformes
- Family: Tetraodontidae
- Genus: Torquigener
- Species: T. tuberculiferus

Binomial name
- Torquigener tuberculiferus (Ogilby, 1912)

= Torquigener tuberculiferus =

Species of fish

Torquigener tuberculiferus, the fringe-gilled toadfish, is a fish of the pufferfish family Tetraodontidae native to the waters around Indonesia.
