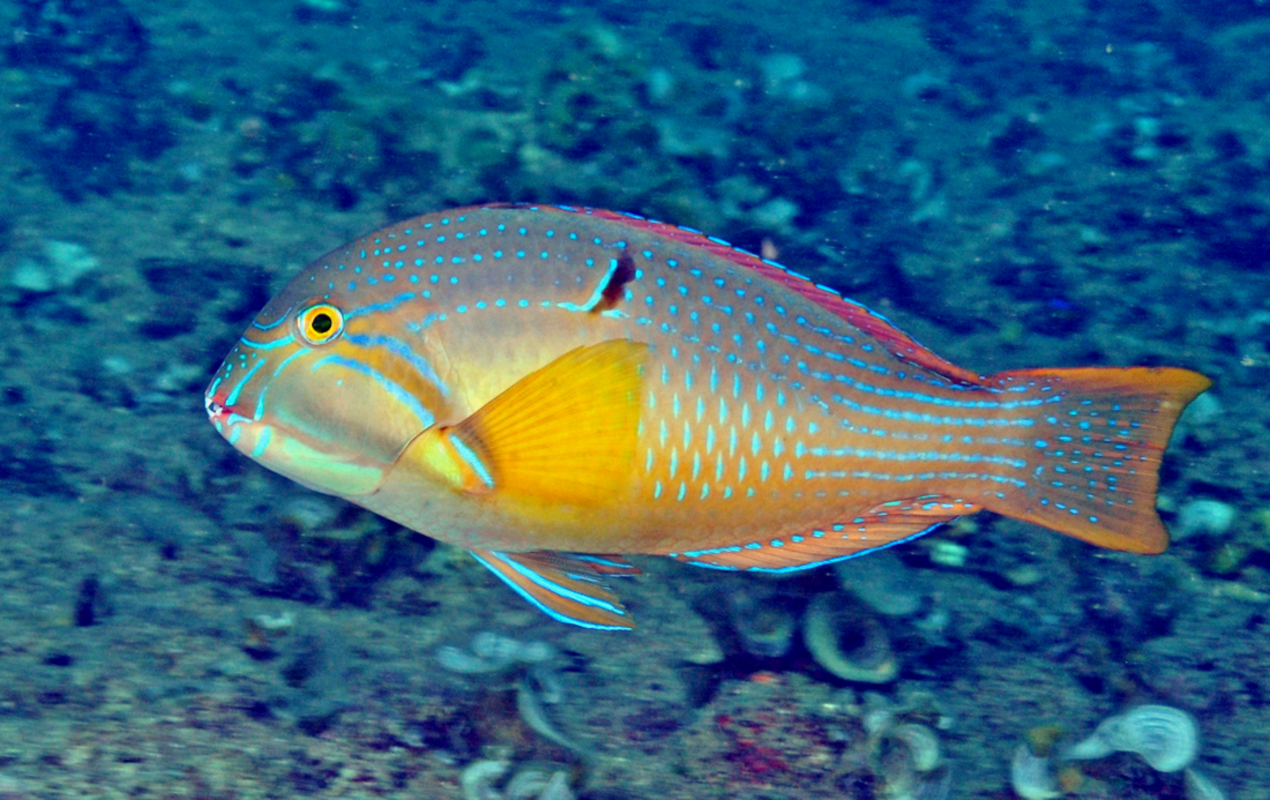
- Blue-spotted tuskfish (C. cauteroma)

Scientific classification
- Kingdom: Animalia
- Phylum: Chordata
- Class: Actinopterygii
- Division: Teleostei
- Order: Labriformes
- Family: Labridae
- Subfamily: Hypsigenyinae
- Genus: Choerodon; Bleeker, 1849

Type species
- Labrus macrodontus Lacépède, 1801

Synonyms
- List: Aspiurochilus Fowler, 1956; Choerodonoides Kamohara, 1958; Choerops Rüppell, 1852; Cossyphodes Bleeker, 1860; Hypsigenys Günther, 1861; Lienardella Fowler & B. A. Bean, 1928; Macrochoerodon Fowler & B. A. Bean, 1928; Peaolopesia J. L. B. Smith, 1949; Torresia Castelnau, 1875]

= Choerodon =

Genus of fishes

Choerodon is a genus of wrasses native to the Indian Ocean and the western Pacific Ocean. They originated in the Miocene, when the Australian and Eurasian Plates collided. They are commonly referred to as tuskfish, because most species have sharp tusk-like teeth.

== Taxonomy ==
The genus Choerodon is most closely related to the odacine wrasses. Both groups are part of the wrasse tribe Hypsigenyini. Choerodon is split into 6 subgenera. Molecular phylogenetic analysis has so far demonstrated the monophyly of the subgenera, although not all species in the genus have been evaluated.

Choerodon typus was traditionally placed within its own genus Xiphocheilus, but both morphological and molecular analyses now place it within Choerodon, with Xiphocheilus becoming its subgenus name instead.

== Potential tool use in tuskfishes ==
Orange-dotted, blue, graphic, and blackspot tuskfish have been recorded using large rocks or hard coral as "anvils", upon which they smash open hard-shelled prey items. All four species belong to the subgenus Choerodon, and can remember to use a particular rock or coral repeatedly for this purpose. This behaviour usually involves invertebrate prey such as clams and sea urchins, but on one occasion, a blue tuskfish was filmed smashing a young green sea turtle on an anvil. Anvil use is also documented in several other wrasse genera.

== Species ==
The 27 currently recognized species in this genus are:

Subgenus	Species	Common name	Image
Aspiurochilus	Choerodon azurio (D. S. Jordan & Snyder, 1901)	Azurio tuskfish	
Aspiurochilus	Choerodon cypselurus Gomon, 2017	swallowtail tuskfish	
Aspiurochilus	Choerodon monostigma J. D. Ogilby, 1910	dark-spot tuskfish	
Aspiurochilus	Choerodon robustus (Günther, 1862)	robust tuskfish	
Aspiurochilus	Choerodon zamboangae (Seale & B. A. Bean, 1907)	purple eyebrowed tuskfish	
Choerodon	Choerodon anchorago (Bloch, 1791)	orange-dotted tuskfish	
Choerodon	Choerodon cauteroma M. F. Gomon & G. R. Allen, 1987	bluespotted tuskfish	
Choerodon	Choerodon cephalotes (Castelnau, 1875)	purple tuskfish	
Choerodon	Choerodon cyanodus (J. Richardson, 1843)	blue tuskfish	
Choerodon	Choerodon graphicus (de Vis, 1885)	graphic tuskfish	
Choerodon	Choerodon oligacanthus (Bleeker, 1851)	white-patch tuskfish	
Choerodon	Choerodon rubescens (Günther, 1862)	baldchin groper	
Choerodon	Choerodon schoenleinii (Valenciennes, 1839)	blackspot tuskfish	
Choerodon	Choerodon venustus (de Vis, 1884)	Venus tuskfish	
Lienardella	Choerodon fasciatus (Günther, 1867)	harlequin tuskfish	
Lutjanilabrus	Choerodon vitta J. D. Ogilby, 1910	redstripe tuskfish	
Peaolopseia	Choerodon albofasciatus Gomon, 2017		
Peaolopseia	Choerodon aurulentus Gomon, 2017	gilded tuskfish	
Peaolopseia	Choerodon frenatus J. D. Ogilby, 1910	bridled tuskfish	
Peaolopseia	Choerodon gomoni G. R. Allen & J. E. Randall, 2002	Gomon's tuskfish	
Peaolopseia	Choerodon gymnogenys (Günther, 1867)		
Peaolopseia	Choerodon jordani (Snyder, 1908)	Jordan's tuskfish	
Peaolopseia	Choerodon margaritiferus Fowler & B. A. Bean, 1928	pearly tuskfish	
Peaolopseia	Choerodon skaiopygmaeus Gomon, 2017		
Peaolopseia	Choerodon sugillatum M. F. Gomon, 1987	wedge-tailed tuskfish	
Peaolopseia	Choerodon zosterophorus (Bleeker, 1868)	Zoster wrasse	
Xiphocheilus	Choerodon typus Bleeker, 1856	blue-banded wrasse	
