= Torquigener perlevis =

Scientific classification
- Kingdom: Animalia
- Phylum: Chordata
- Class: Actinopterygii
- Order: Tetraodontiformes
- Family: Tetraodontidae
- Genus: Torquigener
- Species: T. perlevis

Binomial name
- Torquigener perlevis J. D. Ogilby, 1908

Species of fish

Torquigener perlevis, commonly known as the spineless toadfish, is a species of fish in the family Tetraodontidae. It is found in the coastal waters off northern and eastern Australia from the Gulf of Carpentaria to the Georges River and Botany Bay in Sydney, New South Wales.

James Douglas Ogilby described the spineless toadfish in 1908 from a specimen collected in Queensland.

Torquigener perlevis has an elongate body with a rounded back and flattened belly. It has a small mouth at its apex with thin lips that have numerous papillae and a prominent chin. It has mottled grey and brown upperparts marked with dark brown. It is distinguished from other members of the genus by its lack of spines.
