= Torquigener squamicauda =

Scientific classification
- Kingdom: Animalia
- Phylum: Chordata
- Class: Actinopterygii
- Order: Tetraodontiformes
- Family: Tetraodontidae
- Genus: Torquigener
- Species: T. squamicauda

Binomial name
- Torquigener squamicauda J. D. Ogilby, 1910

Synonyms
- Spheroides squamicauda Ogilby, 1911; Crayracion erythrotaenia Kner

Species of fish

Torquigener squamicauda, commonly known as the brush-tail toadfish or scalytail toadfish, is a species of fish in the family Tetraodontidae. It is found in the coastal waters off eastern Australia from Yeppoon in Queensland to Wattamolla just south of Sydney in New South Wales.

James Douglas Ogilby described the brush-tail toadfish in 1911 from a specimen collected in Moreton Bay by J.T. Jamieson.

Reaching 15 cm (6 in) in length, Torquigener squamicauda has an elongate body with a rounded back and flattened belly. It has a small mouth at its apex with thin lips that have numerous papillae and a prominent chin. It has pale greyish to olive-green upperparts flecked with green and brown.

It is possibly poisonous.
