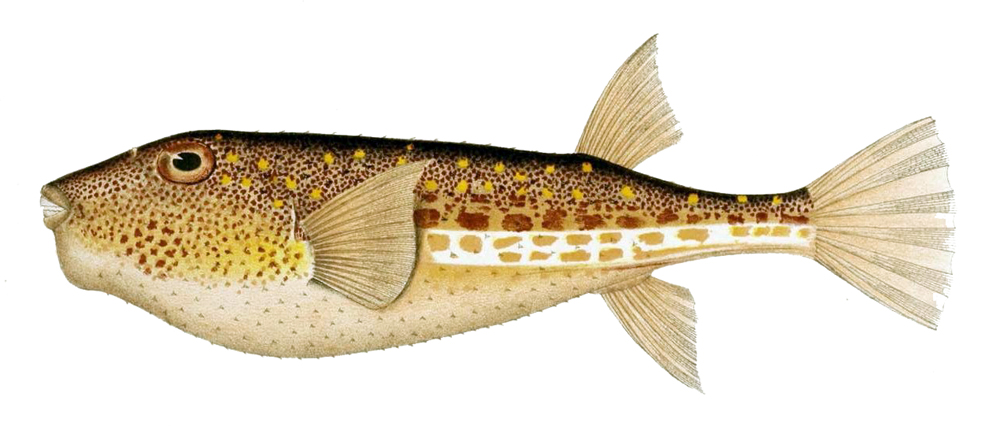
- Torquigener hypselogeneion

Scientific classification
- Kingdom: Animalia
- Phylum: Chordata
- Class: Actinopterygii
- Division: Teleostei
- Order: Tetraodontiformes
- Family: Tetraodontidae
- Subfamily: Tetraodontinae
- Genus: Torquigener; Whitley, 1930

= Torquigener =

Genus of fishes

Torquigener is a genus of pufferfishes native to the Indian and Pacific oceans. Males of at least two Torquigener species are known to make elaborate circular nests on the seafloor.

== Species ==
Twenty species are recognized in this genus:

- Torquigener albomaculosus Matsuura, 2014 (white-spotted pufferfish)
- Torquigener altipinnis J. D. Ogilby, 1891
- Torquigener andersonae Hardy, 1983 (Anderson's toadfish)
- Torquigener balteus Hardy, 1989 (slender blaasop)
- Torquigener brevipinnis Regan, 1903
- Torquigener flavimaculosus Hardy & J. E. Randall, 1983
- Torquigener florealis Cope, 1871
- Torquigener gloerfelti Hardy, 1984
- Torquigener heemstrai K. Matsuura, 2024
- Torquigener hicksi Hardy, 1983 (Hick's toadfish)
- Torquigener hypselogeneion Bleeker, 1852 (orange-spotted toadfish)
- Torquigener marleyi Fowler, 1929
- Torquigener pallimaculatus Hardy, 1983
- Torquigener parcuspinus Hardy, 1983 (yellow-eyed toadfish)
- Torquigener paxtoni Hardy, 1983
- Torquigener perlevis J. D. Ogilby, 1908 (spineless toadfish)
- Torquigener pleurogramma Regan, 1903 (weeping toadfish)
- Torquigener randalli Hardy, 1983 (Randall's puffer)
- Torquigener squamicauda J. D. Ogilby, 1910 (brush-tail toadfish)
- Torquigener tuberculiferus J. D. Ogilby, 1912
- Torquigener vicinus Whitley, 1930
- Torquigener whitleyi Paradice, 1927 (Whitley's toadfish)
