= Torquigener gloerfelti =

Scientific classification
- Kingdom: Animalia
- Phylum: Chordata
- Class: Actinopterygii
- Division: Teleostei
- Order: Tetraodontiformes
- Family: Tetraodontidae
- Genus: Torquigener
- Species: T. gloerfelti

Binomial name
- Torquigener gloerfelti Hardy, 1984

Species of pufferfish

Torquigener gloerfelti is a species of pufferfish in the family Tetraodontidae. It is native to the Western Pacific, where it is known from Bali Strait in Indonesia. The species is demersal and typically occurs at a depth range of 50 to 60 m (164 to 197 ft).
