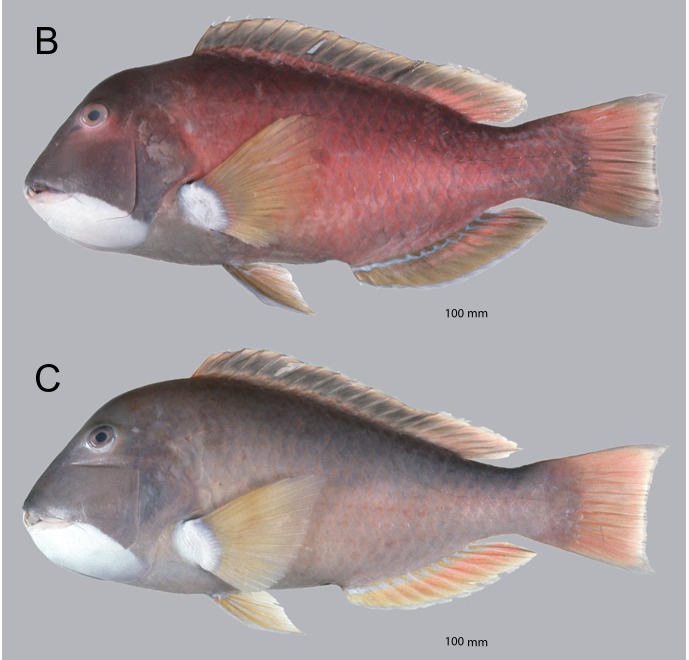
- Initial phase (top), terminal phase (bottom)

Conservation status
- Least Concern (IUCN 3.1)

Scientific classification
- Kingdom: Animalia
- Phylum: Chordata
- Class: Actinopterygii
- Order: Labriformes
- Family: Labridae
- Genus: Choerodon
- Species: C. rubescens

Binomial name
- Choerodon rubescens (Günther, 1862)

Synonyms
- Choerops rubescens Günther, 1862

= Baldchin groper =

Species of fish

The baldchin groper (Choerodon rubescens) is a species of wrasse endemic to Western Australia, where it occurs on coral and weed-grown rocky reefs. This species can reach a length of 90 cm (35 in).
