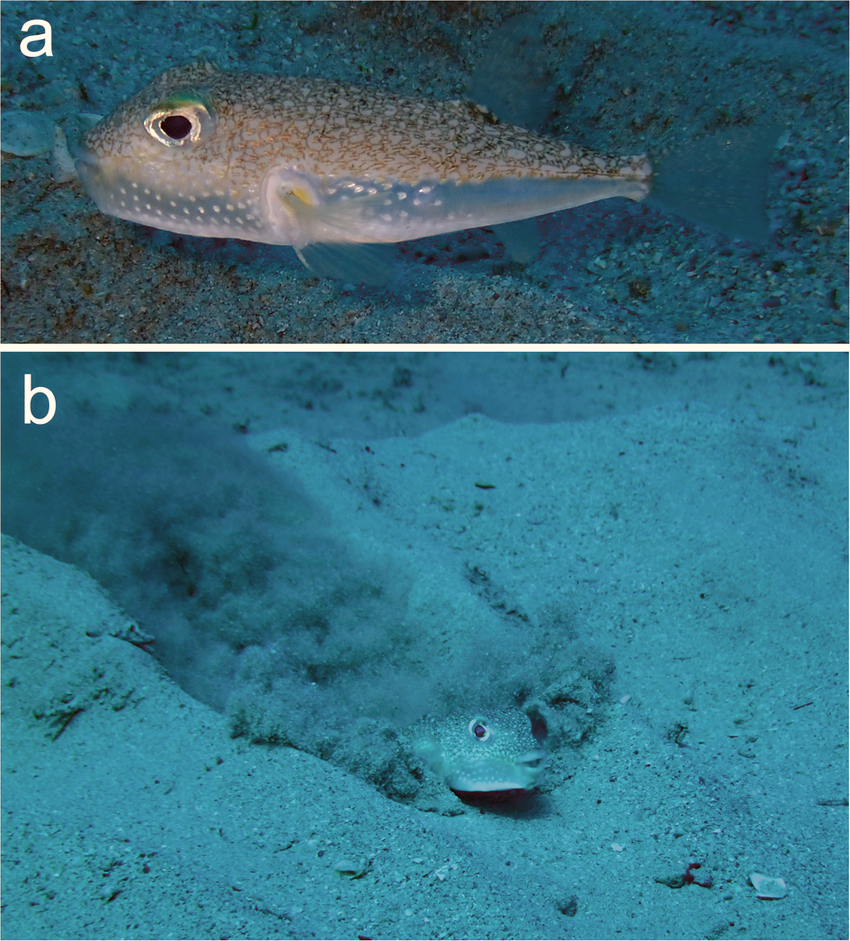

Scientific classification
- Kingdom: Animalia
- Phylum: Chordata
- Class: Actinopterygii
- Division: Teleostei
- Order: Tetraodontiformes
- Family: Tetraodontidae
- Genus: Torquigener
- Species: T. albomaculosus

Binomial name
- Torquigener albomaculosus Matsuura, 2014

= Torquigener albomaculosus =

Species of fish

Torquigener albomaculosus, or the white-spotted pufferfish, is the 20th discovered species of the genus Torquigener. The species was discovered in the ocean waters around the Ryukyu Islands in Japan off the south coast of Amami Ōshima Island. Observed depths of the species range between 10 and 27 m (33 and 89 ft). The fish's head and body are colored brown with white spots at the back. Its abdomen is silvery-white with white spots.

== Discovery ==
The white-spotted pufferfish is a relatively small (10 cm or 3.9 in) fish that was named in 2014 by a research group for the National Museum of Nature and Science. The fish has a brownish-yellow body with white spots and the ventral part of the body is translucent. The study specimens were collected off the south coast of Amami Ōshima in the Ryukyu Islands. Naming this species took the genus Torquigener to a total of 20 species.

== Mating ritual ==
This pufferfish is known for its unique and complex courtship display. Their circular nests measure 2 m (6.6 ft) in diameter. Males create large geometric circles in the sand to attract females for copulation. To construct the ornate circular structure, a male works for more than a week straight. He flaps his fins along the seafloor to build ridges which he then decorates with shells and coral and sculpts a unique maze pattern in the center where a female might lay her eggs if, after evaluating his construction skills, she chooses him. He guards the eggs until they hatch and does not reuse the circles.

Such nest designs were noticed since 1995, but their creation remained a mystery until the species' discovery. The nests are created to attract mates through the nest's impressive design and ability to gather fine sand particles, both of which influence a female's mate choice. Males never reuse a nest. The white-spotted pufferfish was originally thought to be unique among pufferfish in creating these elaborate nests, however in 2018 similar nests were observed off the coast of Western Australia, presumably belonging to a related species of Torquigener.

=== Nest description ===
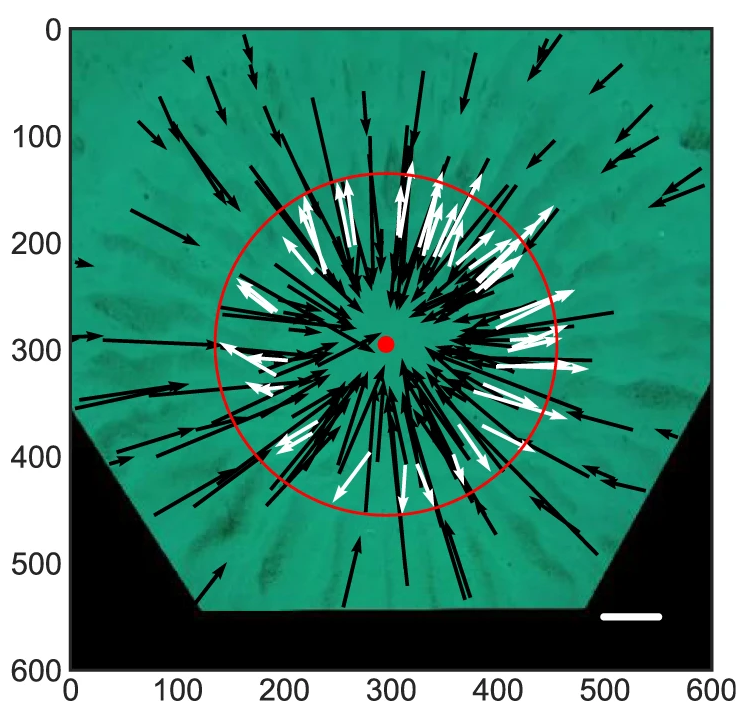
Movements of the white-spotted pufferfish for nest construction

These structures are found at depths of 10–30 m (33–98 ft) on the seabed off the south coast of the Amami Ōshima Island. These circular structures are geometrically ordered with a diameter of 2 meters and are formed in 7–9 days. The outer ring of the nest consists of a series of mountains and groves and the center is an irregular maze like pattern. The center is formed with very fine sand particles with respect to the outer portion. It is now thought that they are the most ordered structures created by any fish. Each circle, two meters in diameter, has a huge cost of construction for the relatively small (10 cm or 3.9 in) fish.

The fish begins making the structure by forming a simple circle shape in the sand using its belly. Once this is complete the fish makes the valleys and peaks by waving its fins while swimming in a straight line from the outside to the inside of the nest. The center is formed by either inside to the outside, or outside to inside movements, while waving its anal fin to form the irregular pattern. Through these movements, very fine sand particles are moved to the center. Once the structure is completed, it is maintained until spawning by continuing the same inward-outward movements. After spawning, the structure gradually deteriorates since maintenance behavior is halted.

In a 2014 documentary by the BBC, narrator David Attenborough describes the pufferfish as "dull, almost to the point of invisibility. But to compensate, he is probably nature's greatest artist."

=== Purpose ===
==== Female choice ====
This behavior is an example of a mating ritual, because it is used to attract mates and raise their young. It is assumed that the nest is important in female choice; however, there are no definitive factors known to influence the females' choice. There are a number of possible factors to consider, such as size and number of peaks/valleys, size of circle, sand composition, and color. This is also believed to be the most geometrically ordered structure created by any fish. There is evidence that females may be able to predict male body size and thus health of the fish from the structure formed. Larger males were shown to push sand further than smaller males, thus making larger spaces between peaks of the outer ring structure than those of a smaller male's nest. Females may be able to recognize these differences and assess whom she wants to mate with.

In addition to this, two more courtship behaviors are carried out by the males before spawning. When females approach the nest, the males stir up the sand in the nest, and then perform a rush and retreat behavior to the females. It is hypothesized that the stirring of the sand is to show females the quality and quantity of the sand in the structure. For the rush and repeat behavior, the males would move to the outer portion of the nest, then rush towards the females, and then retreat back to the outer ring. After these courtship behaviors, the female will decide whether or not to spawn.

==== Mating ====
Spawning occurs from spring to summer. If a female decides to mate after the male performs the courtship behaviors, she will descend to the floor of the nest and the male will approach her. Mating occurs in pairs, and they will press their bodies together and vibrate until the female releases her gametes in the nest. Males may mate with multiple females in one day.

==== Parental care ====
After mating, the females leave the nest and the males stay. The males will no longer perform maintenance on the nest once the eggs are deposited. Males will care for the eggs and protect them until they hatch. They will chase off predators or other rival males that come to the nest. Eggs hatch around five days after mating, and the nest slowly deteriorates over this time. After hatching, males leave and will not use the same nest again.

== Cultural impact ==
In 2015, the International Institute for Species Exploration named it as one of the "Top 10 New Species" discovered in 2014. They were described by David Attenborough as "the greatest artist of the animal kingdom".
