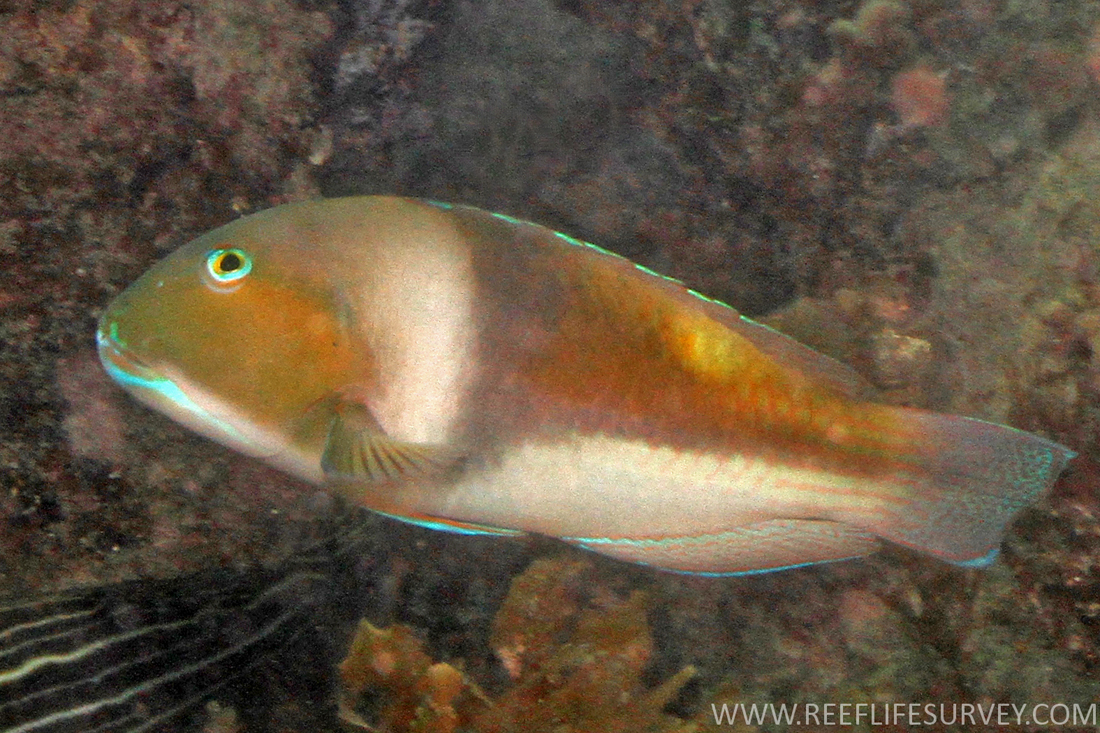

Conservation status
- Least Concern (IUCN 3.1)

Scientific classification
- Kingdom: Animalia
- Phylum: Chordata
- Class: Actinopterygii
- Order: Labriformes
- Family: Labridae
- Genus: Choerodon
- Species: C. cyanodus

Binomial name
- Choerodon cyanodus (J. Richardson, 1843)

Synonyms
- Labrus cyanodus J. Richardson, 1843; Choerops albigena De Vis, 1885; Choerops olivaceus De Vis, 1885; Choerops concolor De Vis, 1885 (ambiguous); Choerops unimaculatus De Vis, 1885 (ambiguous)

= Blue tuskfish =

Species of fish

The blue tuskfish, Choerodon cyanodus, is a species of wrasse native to the Indian and western Pacific Oceans, where it is known to occur around Australia, but has been claimed to occur more widely. It inhabits reefs. This species can reach a length of 70 cm (28 in). It can be found in the aquarium trade. It eats mollusks and the hatchlings and juveniles of green sea turtles once they reach the water.
