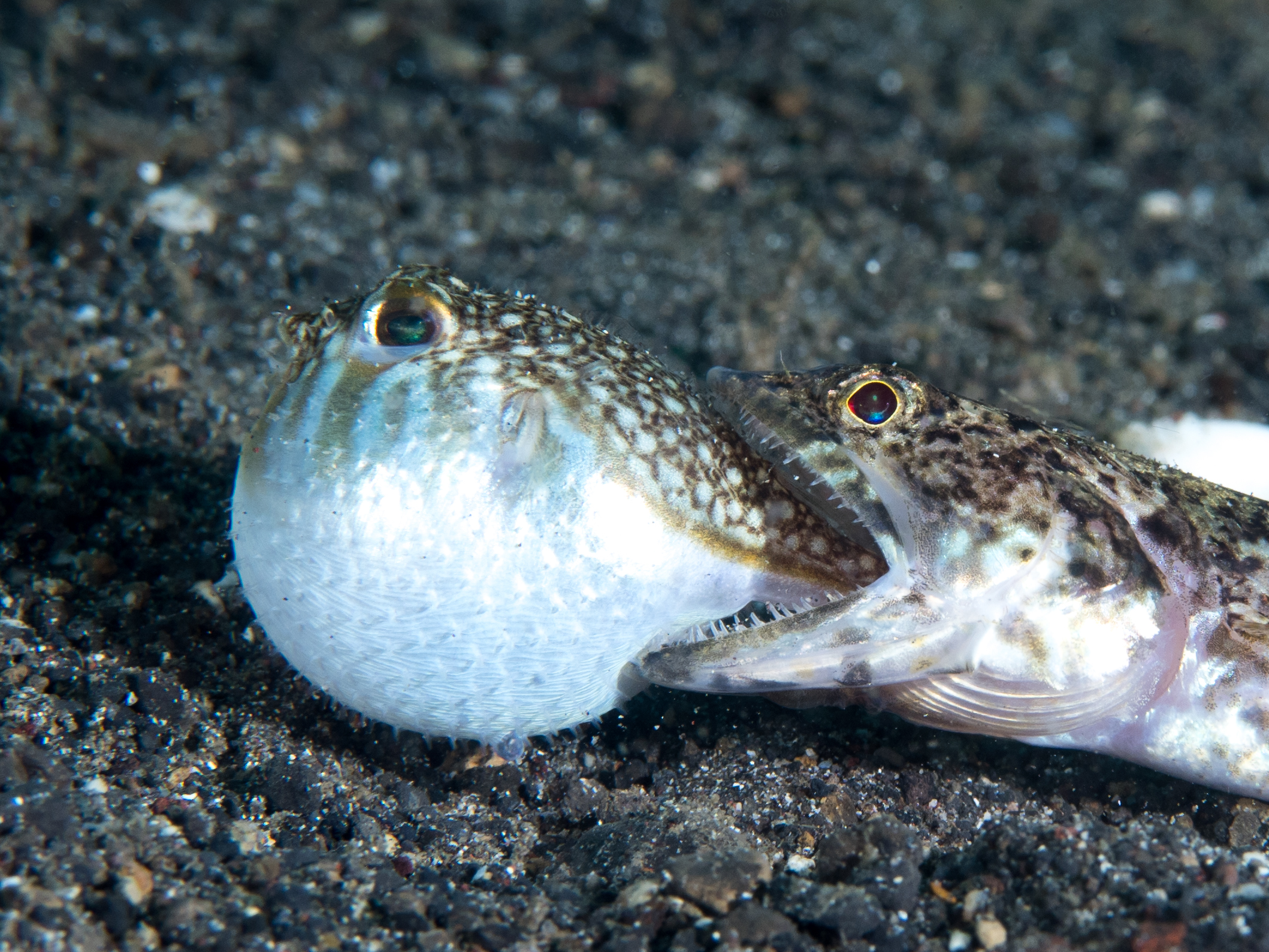

Conservation status
- Least Concern (IUCN 3.1)

Scientific classification
- Kingdom: Animalia
- Phylum: Chordata
- Class: Actinopterygii
- Order: Tetraodontiformes
- Family: Tetraodontidae
- Genus: Torquigener
- Species: T. brevipinnis

Binomial name
- Torquigener brevipinnis (Regan, 1903)

= Torquigener brevipinnis =

Species of fish

Torquigener brevipinnis is a species of fish in the family Tetraodontidae. It is found in Australia, Indonesia, Japan, New Caledonia, Papua New Guinea, and the Philippines.
