= Torquigener pallimaculatus =

Scientific classification
- Kingdom: Animalia
- Phylum: Chordata
- Class: Actinopterygii
- Order: Tetraodontiformes
- Family: Tetraodontidae
- Genus: Torquigener
- Species: T. pallimaculatus

Binomial name
- Torquigener pallimaculatus Hardy, 1983

Species of fish

Torquigener pallimaculatus, commonly known as the rusty-spotted toadfish, is a fish of the pufferfish family Tetraodontidae native to the Indian Ocean and northern Australia.
