= Torquigener andersonae =

Scientific classification
- Kingdom: Animalia
- Phylum: Chordata
- Class: Actinopterygii
- Order: Tetraodontiformes
- Family: Tetraodontidae
- Genus: Torquigener
- Species: T. andersonae

Binomial name
- Torquigener andersonae Hardy, 1983

Species of fish

Torquigener andersonae, commonly known as Anderson's toadfish, is a species of fish in the family Tetraodontidae. It is found in the coastal waters of southeastern Australia. It was described by Graham Hardy in 1983, who named it for a colleague at the University of New South Wales, Dr. Jennifer M. E. Anderson. It has been recorded from Jervis Bay and Bermagui on the southern New South Wales coast.
