= Torquigener paxtoni =

Scientific classification
- Kingdom: Animalia
- Phylum: Chordata
- Class: Actinopterygii
- Order: Tetraodontiformes
- Family: Tetraodontidae
- Genus: Torquigener
- Species: T. paxtoni

Binomial name
- Torquigener paxtoni Hardy, 1983

Species of fish

Torquigener paxtoni, commonly known as Paxton's toadfish, is a fish of the pufferfish family Tetraodontidae, native to Shark Bay (Western Australia).
