= Whitley's toadfish =

Conservation status
- Least Concern (IUCN 3.1)

Scientific classification
- Kingdom: Animalia
- Phylum: Chordata
- Class: Actinopterygii
- Order: Tetraodontiformes
- Family: Tetraodontidae
- Genus: Torquigener
- Species: T. whitleyi

Binomial name
- Torquigener whitleyi Paradice, 1927

Species of fish

Whitley's toadfish (Torquigener whitleyi) is a species of fish in the family Tetraodontidae that reaches a length of 9.8 cm, and is a host to Bianium plicitum.

== Distribution, habitat, and feeding ==
It lives in the Indo-West Pacific, from northern Australia to Papua New Guinea. It lives at depths from 0 to 50 meters near coastal waters in sandy-bottom substrates with no vegetation, and feeds on molluscs and crustaceans in the areas it inhabits.

== Conservation ==
Its population is unknown, yet it occurs in marine protected areas, and has no specific threats to it, and the IUCN Red List puts it at "least concern".
