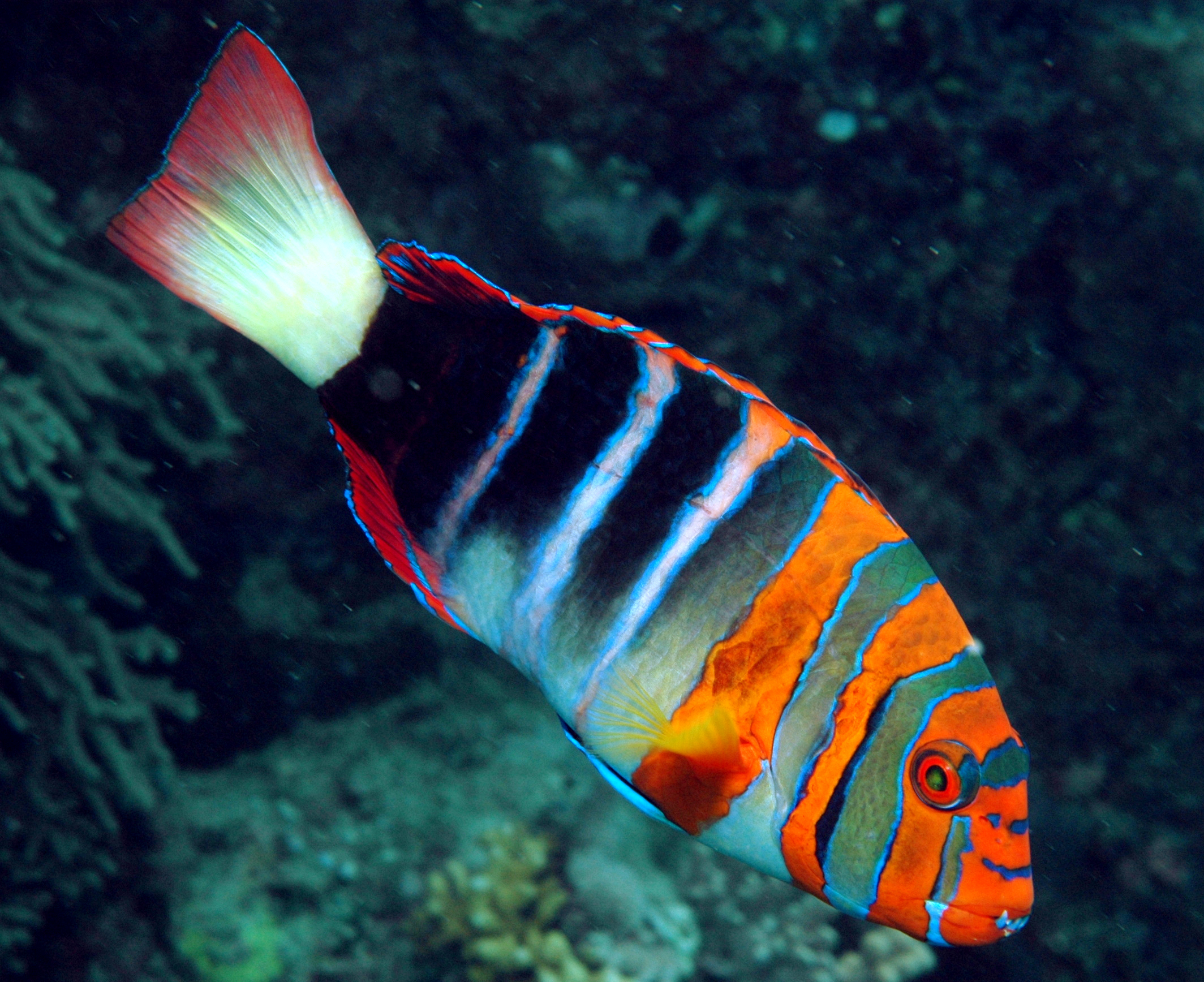

Conservation status
- Least Concern (IUCN 3.1)

Scientific classification
- Kingdom: Animalia
- Phylum: Chordata
- Class: Actinopterygii
- Order: Labriformes
- Family: Labridae
- Genus: Choerodon
- Species: C. fasciatus

Binomial name
- Choerodon fasciatus (Günther, 1867)

Synonyms
- Xiphochilus fasciatus Günther, 1867; Lienardella fasciata (Günther, 1867); Lepidaplois mirabilis Snyder, 1908; Choerodon balerensis Herre, 1950

= Harlequin tuskfish =

Species of fish

The harlequin tuskfish (Choerodon fasciatus) is a species of wrasse native to the western Pacific Ocean. It occasionally makes its way into the aquarium trade.

== Distribution and habitat ==
The species is anti-equatorial. In the northern hemisphere, it ranges from Okinawa in southern Japan to northern Philippines. In the southern hemisphere, its range includes Papua New Guinea, the Queensland coast of Australia, Lord Howe Island and New Caledonia. This species inhabits reefs at depths from 5 to 35 m (16 to 115 ft).

== Description ==
The harlequin tuskfish grows to a length of 30 cm (12 in). It is brightly colored, with about 8 pairs of alternating orange, blue and white vertical bands on the flanks. It has sharp blue teeth. The specimens found in Australia generally have brighter coloration.

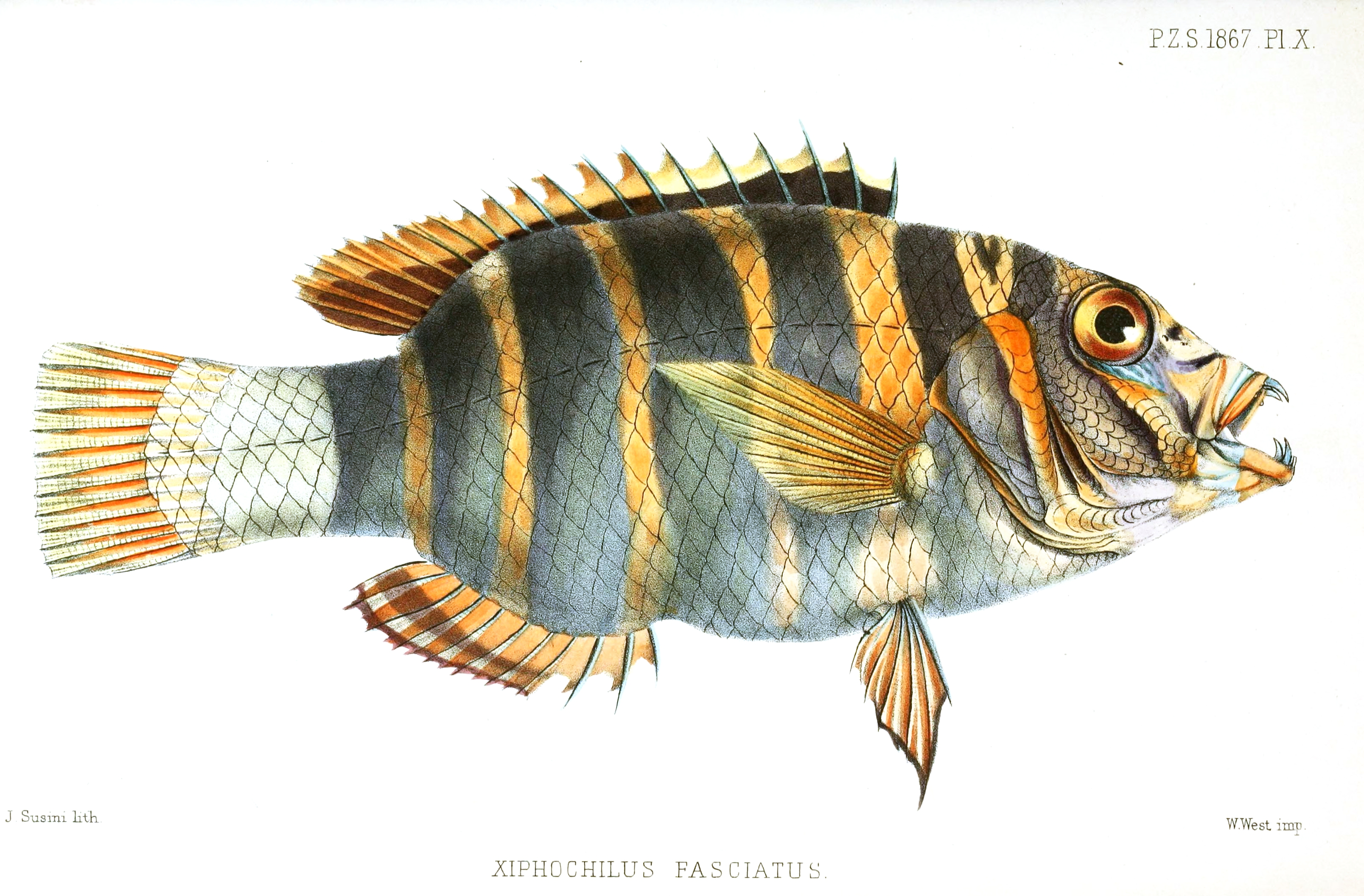
1867 illustration

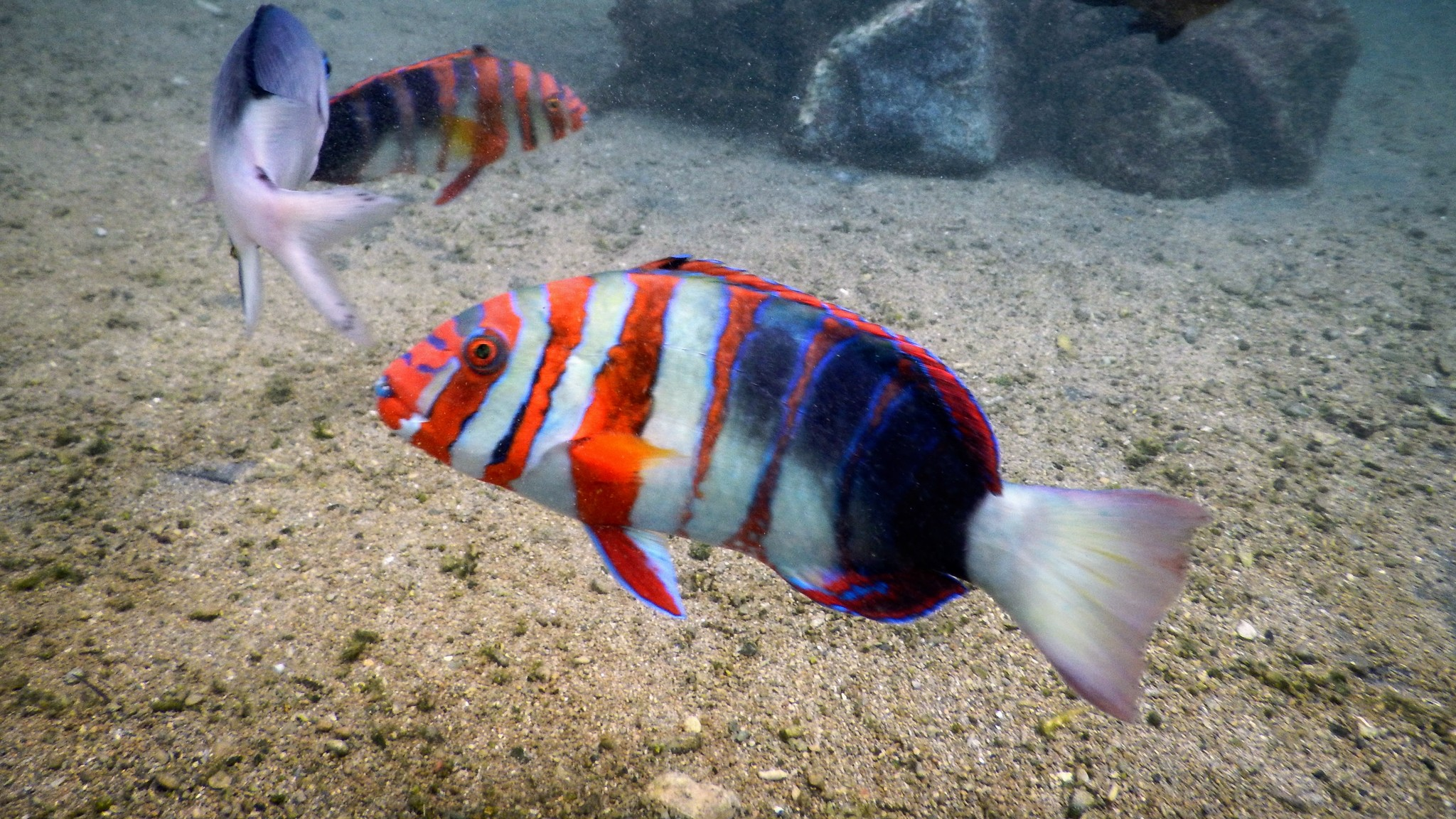
At Queensland, Australia

== Diet ==
The harlequin tuskfish is a carnivore, eating mostly benthic invertebrates such as echinoderms, crustaceans, molluscs, and worms.

== Predators ==
Larger fish, including snappers, moray eels and reef sharks (of the family Carcharhinidae), prey on the harlequin tuskfish.

== In the aquarium ==
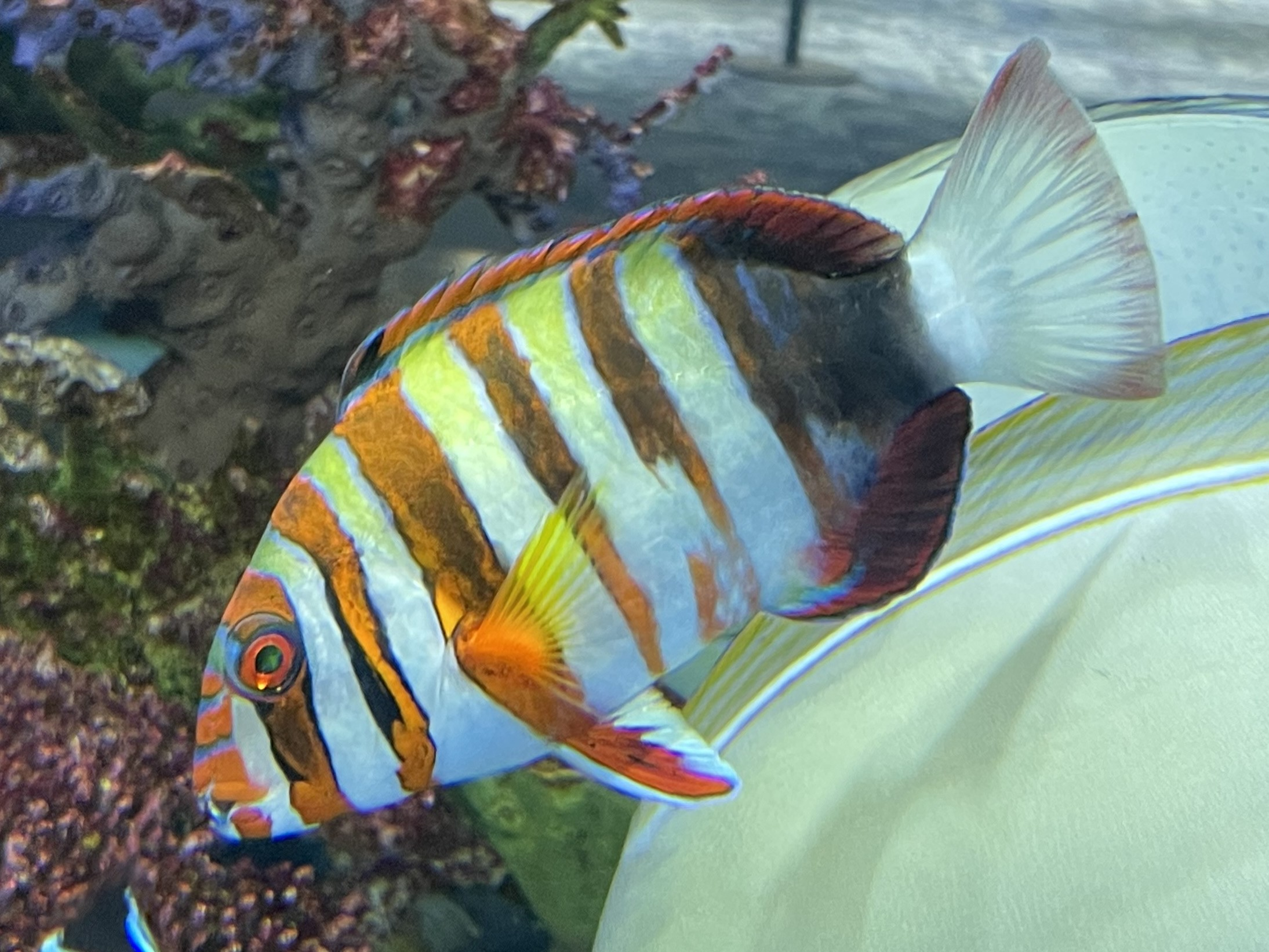
In captivity

The harlequin tuskfish is a moderately difficult fish to maintain in captivity: juveniles can be shy and easily bullied by aggressive tankmates, while adults are quite aggressive. Ideal tankmates would include marine angelfish, tangs, and small triggerfish. However, it will not tolerate its own kind, so there should be only one specimen per tank. The harlequin tuskfish is not reef-safe: although it does not typically nip at corals or sessile invertebrates, it does attack and consume crabs, hermit crabs, snails, and shrimps.

At a minimum, the harlequin tuskfish should be kept in a 120-gallon tank for a single specimen, and suitable food includes brine shrimp, mysis, and shellfish. A temperature of 25–28 °C (77–82 °F) is ideal for maintaining the harlequin tuskfish.
