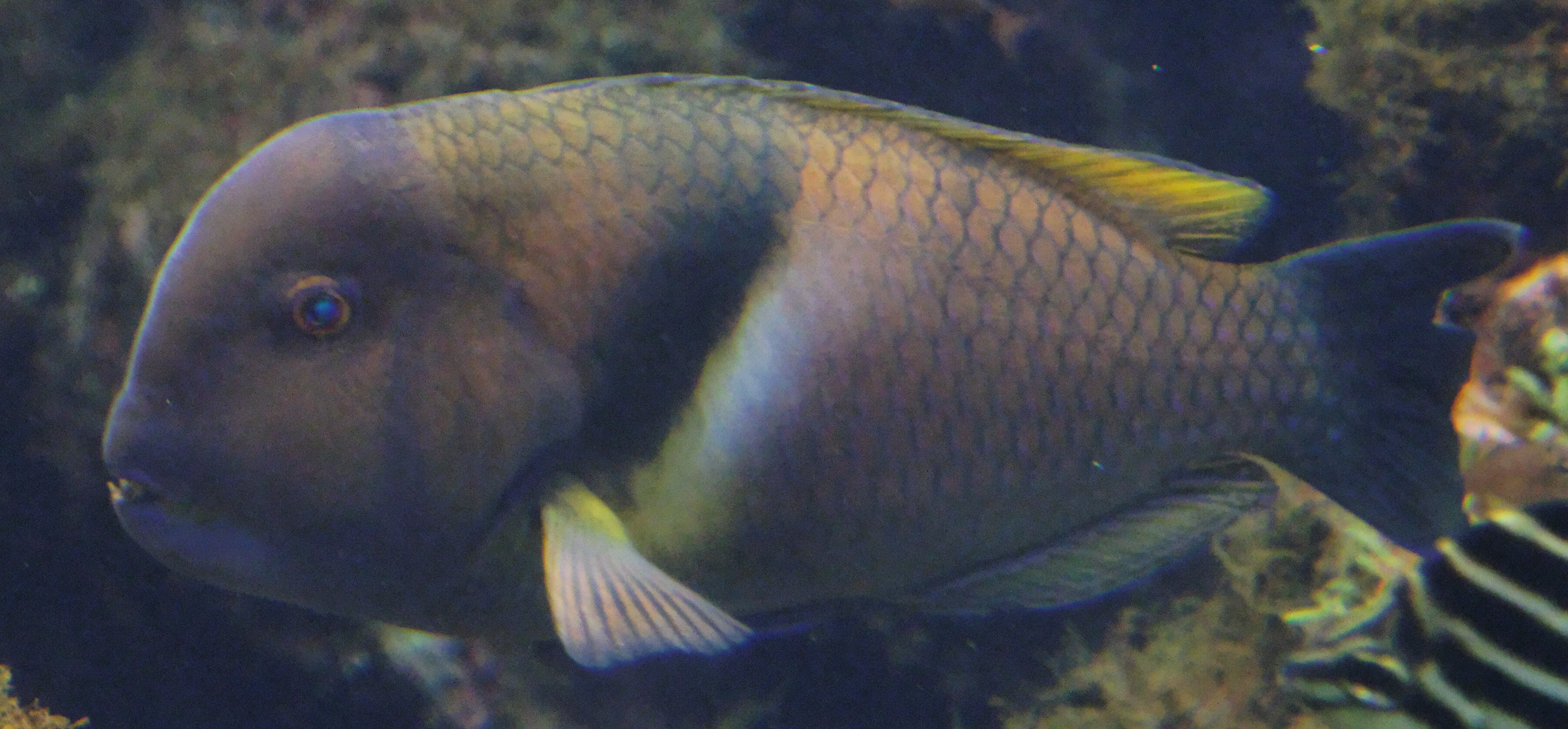

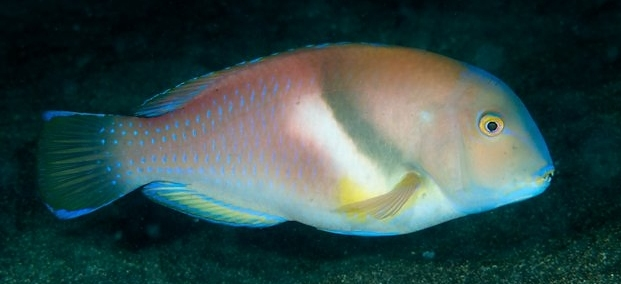
- Terminal phase adult (top) and initial phase adult (bottom)

Conservation status
- Data Deficient (IUCN 3.1)

Scientific classification
- Kingdom: Animalia
- Phylum: Chordata
- Class: Actinopterygii
- Order: Labriformes
- Family: Labridae
- Genus: Choerodon
- Species: C. azurio

Binomial name
- Choerodon azurio (D. S. Jordan & Snyder, 1901)

Synonyms
- Choerops azurio D. S. Jordan & Snyder, 1901; Labrus japonicus Valenciennes, 1839 (ambiguous); Crenilabrus stejnegeri Ishikawa, 1904

= Azurio tuskfish =

Species of fish

The Azurio tuskfish (Choerodon azurio), also known as the scarbreast tuskfin, is a species of wrasse native to the western Pacific, where it occurs off the coasts of eastern Asia. It can be found in areas with rocky substrates at depths from 8 to 50 m (26 to 164 ft). This species can reach a length of 40 cm (16 in). It can be found in the aquarium trade. It is threatened by overfishing and habitat loss; it is a popular target for spearfishers and is considered an excellent food fish.

Terminal phase adults can be distinguished from initial phase adults by the nearly black caudal fin.

== Gallery ==
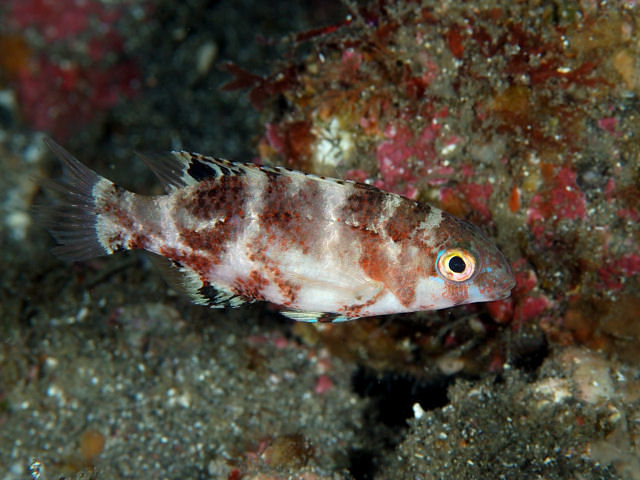
Juvenile

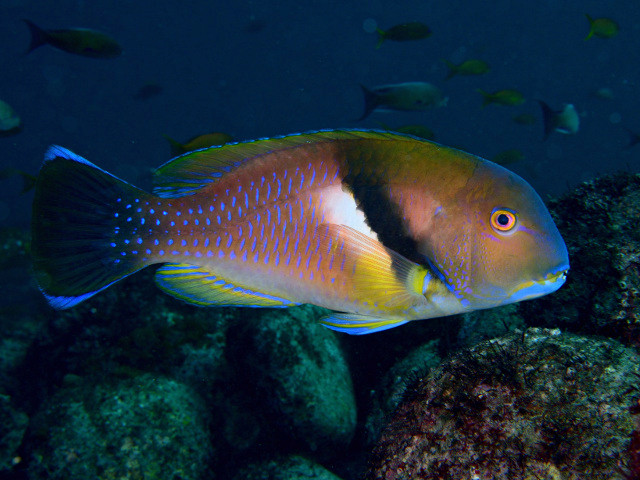
Adult

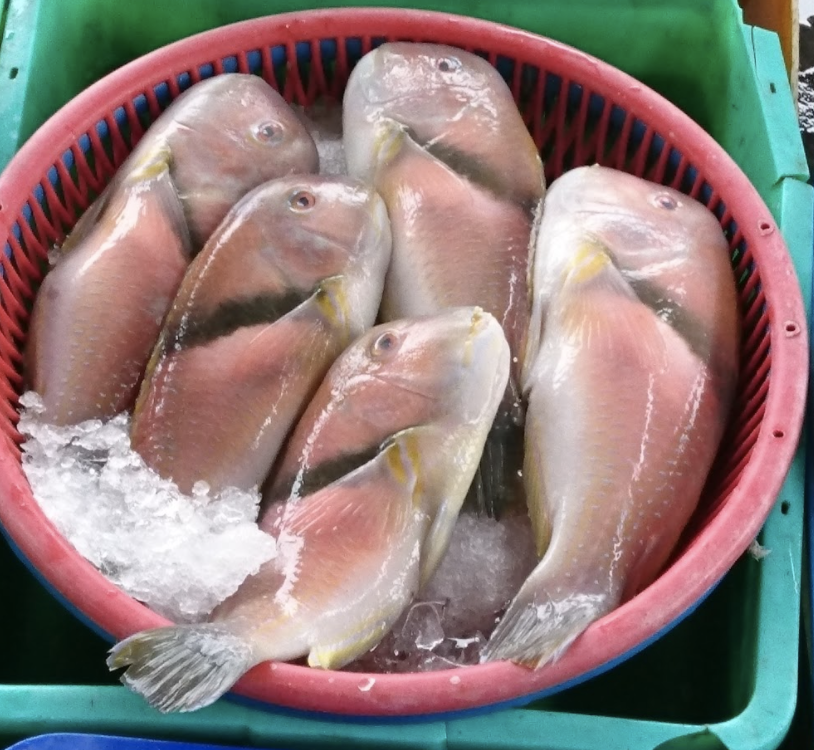
At a market

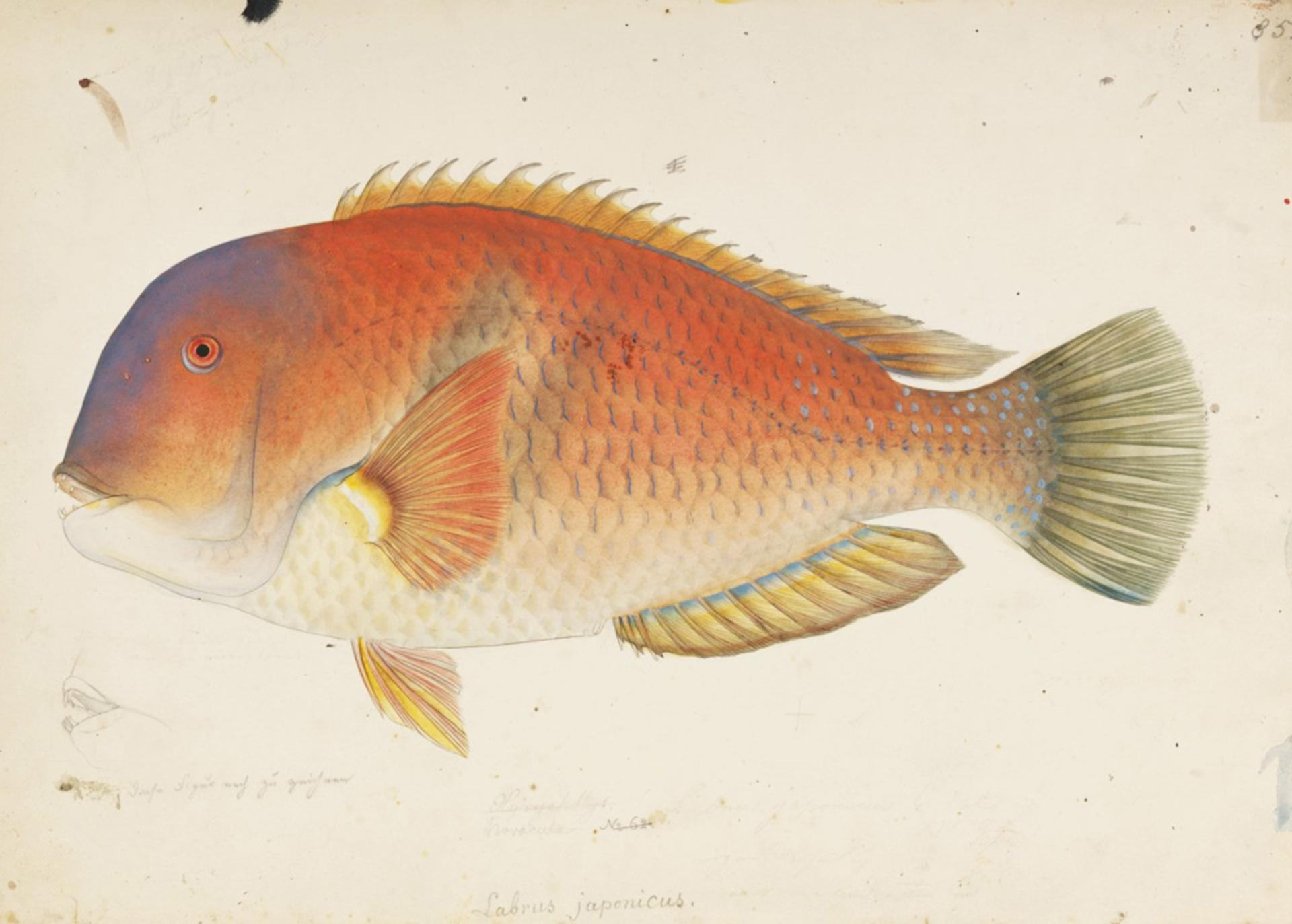
Illustration by Kawahara Keiga, 1823 - 1829.
