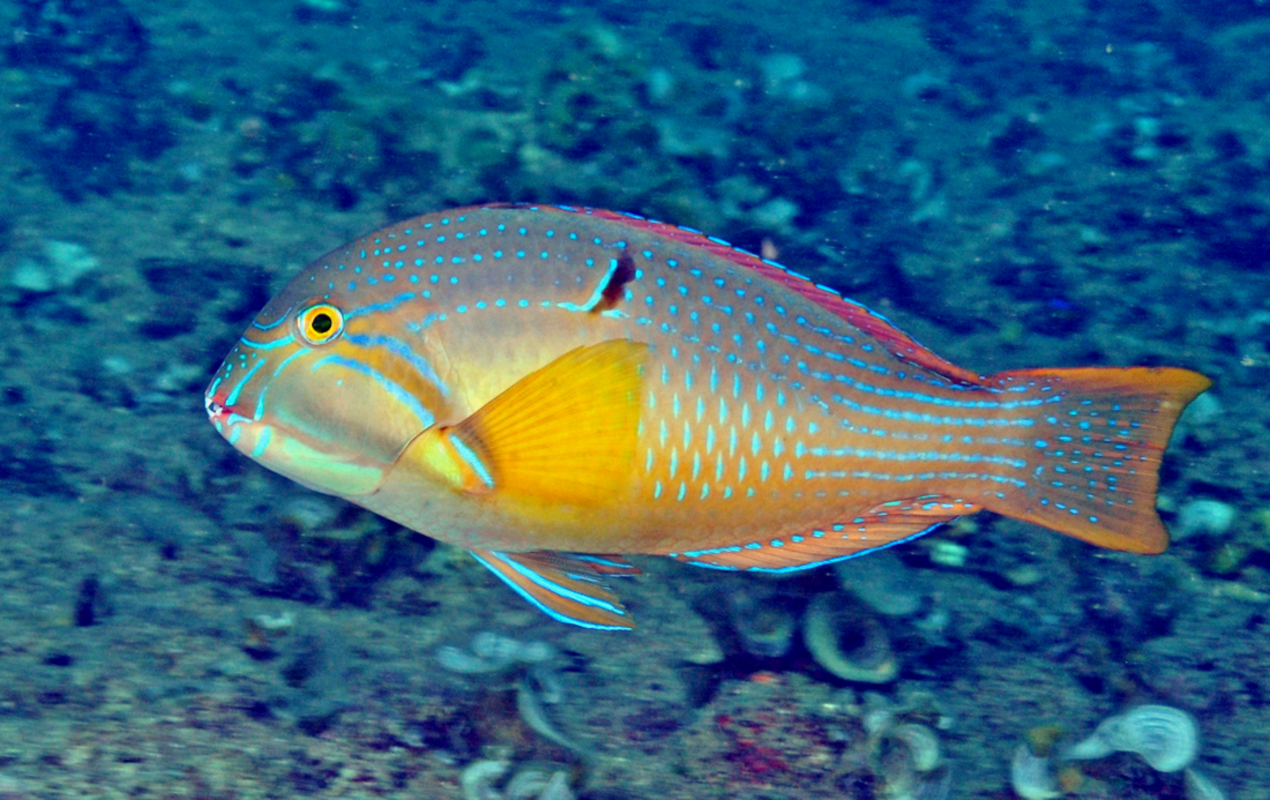
- Initial phase
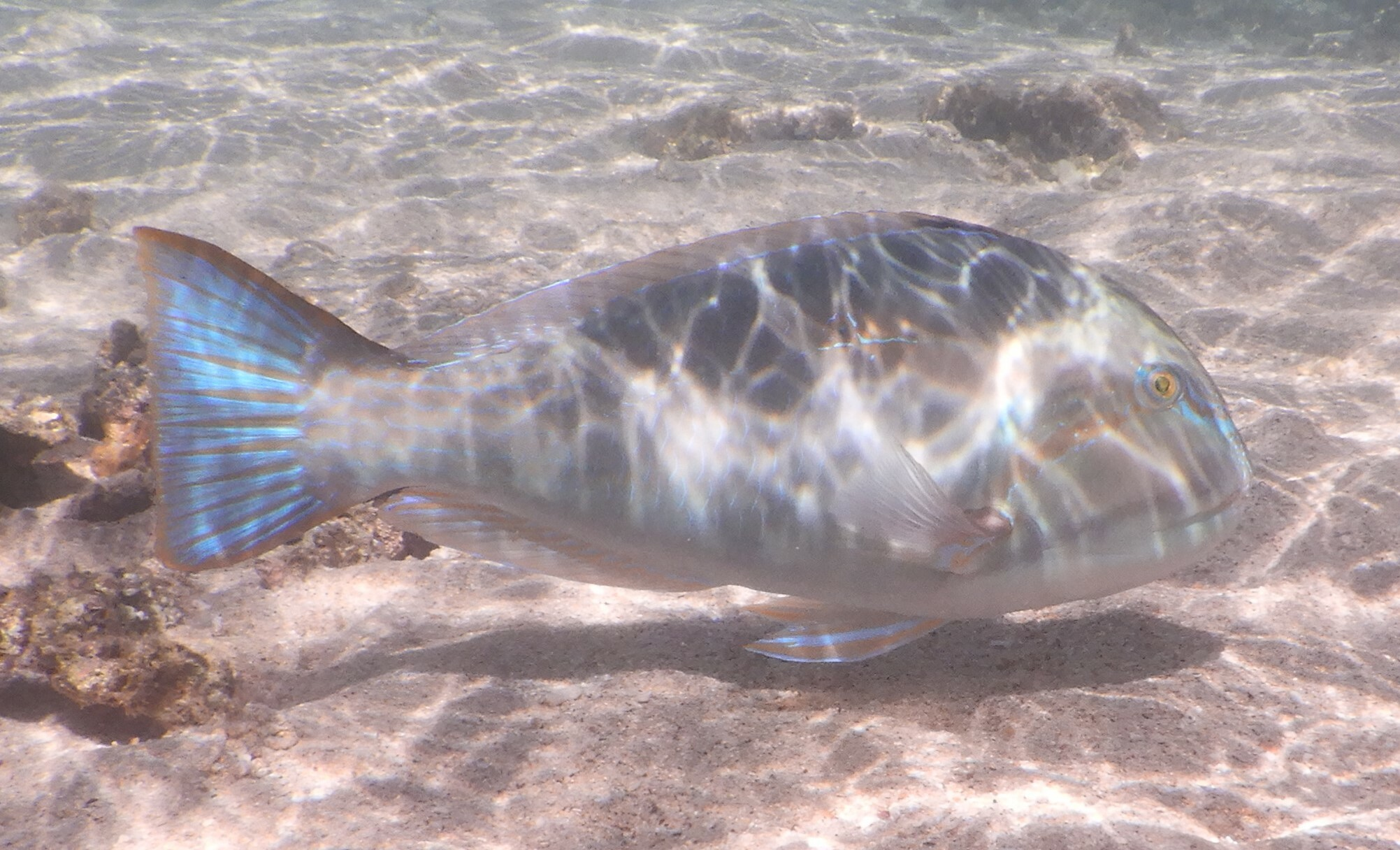
- Terminal phase

Conservation status
- Least Concern (IUCN 3.1)

Scientific classification
- Kingdom: Animalia
- Phylum: Chordata
- Class: Actinopterygii
- Order: Labriformes
- Family: Labridae
- Genus: Choerodon
- Species: C. cauteroma

Binomial name
- Choerodon cauteroma M. F. Gomon & G. R. Allen, 1987

= Bluespotted tuskfish =

Species of fish

The bluespotted tuskfish (Choerodon cauteroma) is a species of wrasse native to the coastal waters of northwestern Australia. They occur in reef environments, preferring areas with sandy substrates or weedy growth. This species can reach a length of 36 cm (14 in).
