= Torquigener parcuspinus =

Scientific classification
- Kingdom: Animalia
- Phylum: Chordata
- Class: Actinopterygii
- Order: Tetraodontiformes
- Family: Tetraodontidae
- Genus: Torquigener
- Species: T. parcuspinus

Binomial name
- Torquigener parcuspinus Hardy, 1983

Species of fish

Torquigener parcuspinus, commonly known as the yellow-eyed toadfish, is a fish of the pufferfish family Tetraodontidae, native to the eastern Indian Ocean, Indonesia, and northern Australia.
