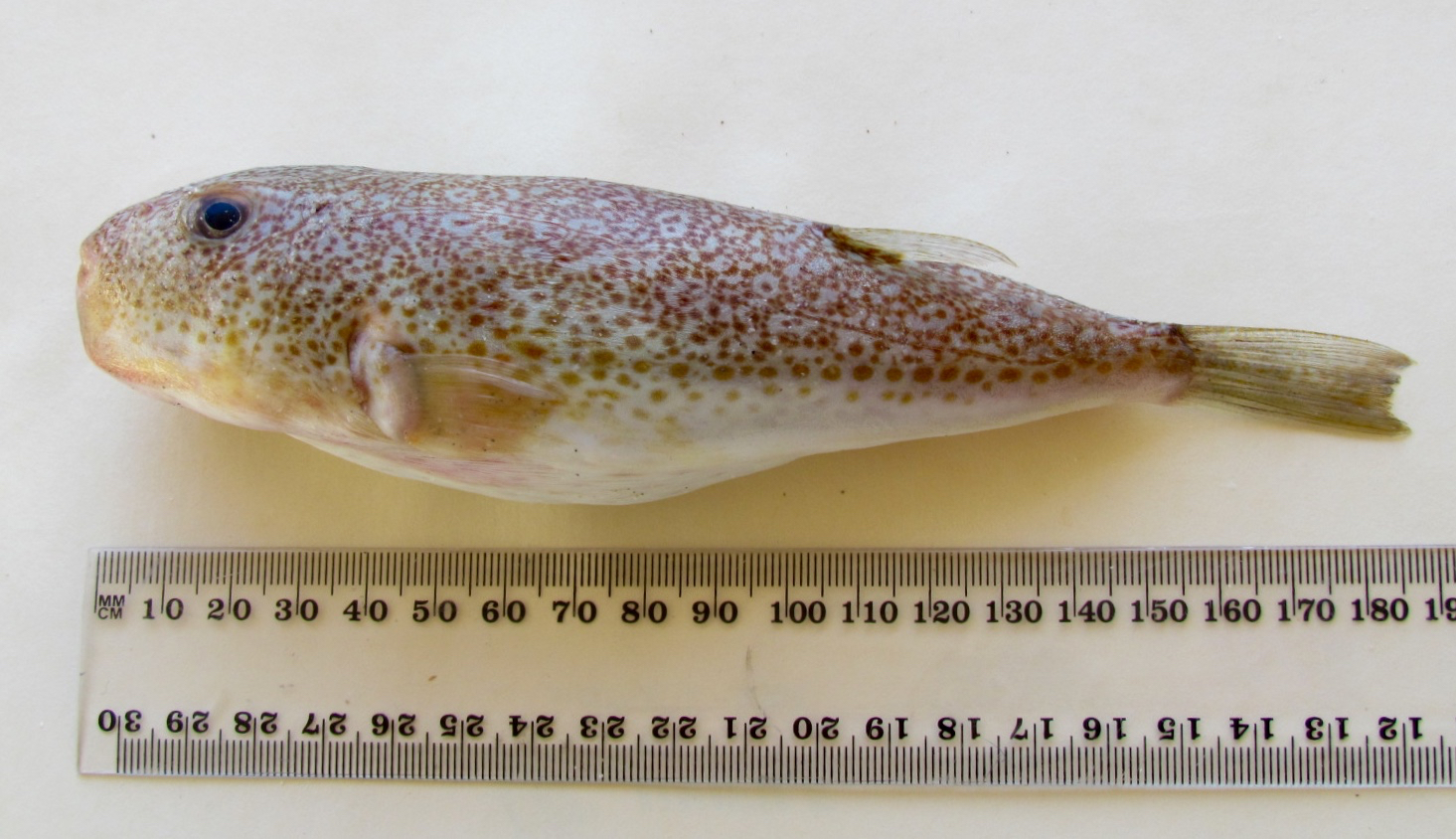

Scientific classification
- Kingdom: Animalia
- Phylum: Chordata
- Class: Actinopterygii
- Order: Tetraodontiformes
- Family: Tetraodontidae
- Genus: Torquigener
- Species: T. vicinus

Binomial name
- Torquigener vicinus Whitley, 1930

= Torquigener vicinus =

Species of fish

Torquigener vicinus is a species of fish in the family Tetraodontidae. It is found in the coastal waters of southwestern Australia.
