= Torquigener hicksi =

Scientific classification
- Kingdom: Animalia
- Phylum: Chordata
- Class: Actinopterygii
- Order: Tetraodontiformes
- Family: Tetraodontidae
- Genus: Torquigener
- Species: T. hicksi

Binomial name
- Torquigener hicksi Hardy, 1983

Species of fish

Torquigener hicksi, commonly known as Hicks's toadfish, is a fish of the pufferfish family Tetraodontidae native to northern Australia.
