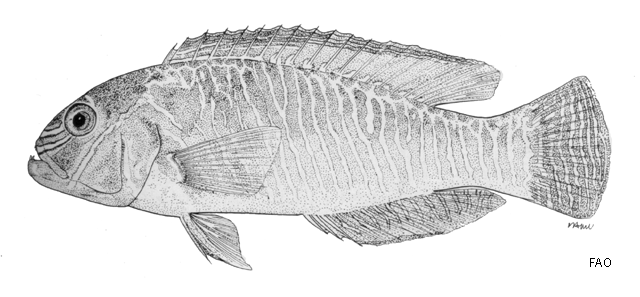

Conservation status
- Least Concern (IUCN 3.1)

Scientific classification
- Kingdom: Animalia
- Phylum: Chordata
- Class: Actinopterygii
- Order: Labriformes
- Family: Labridae
- Genus: Choerodon; Bleeker, 1840
- Species: C. typus

Binomial name
- Choerodon typus Bleeker, 1856

Synonyms
- Genus: Peaolopesia J. L. B. Smith, 1949; Species: Xiphochilus quadrimaculatus Günther, 1880; Xiphocheilus quadrimaculatus Günther, 1880

= Blue-banded wrasse =

Species of fish

The blue-banded wrasse (Choerodon typus) is a species of wrasse native to the easternmost Indian Ocean and the western Pacific Ocean. It is an inhabitant of reefs, preferring substrates of flat sand or rubble at depths of from 15 to 85 m (49 to 279 ft). This species grows to 12 cm (4.7 in) in standard length. It is of minor importance to local commercial fisheries.

== Taxonomy ==
It was previously thought to be the only species of the genus Xiphocheilus, but this was refuted when molecular phylogenetics showed that it nests deep within the genus Choerodon.
