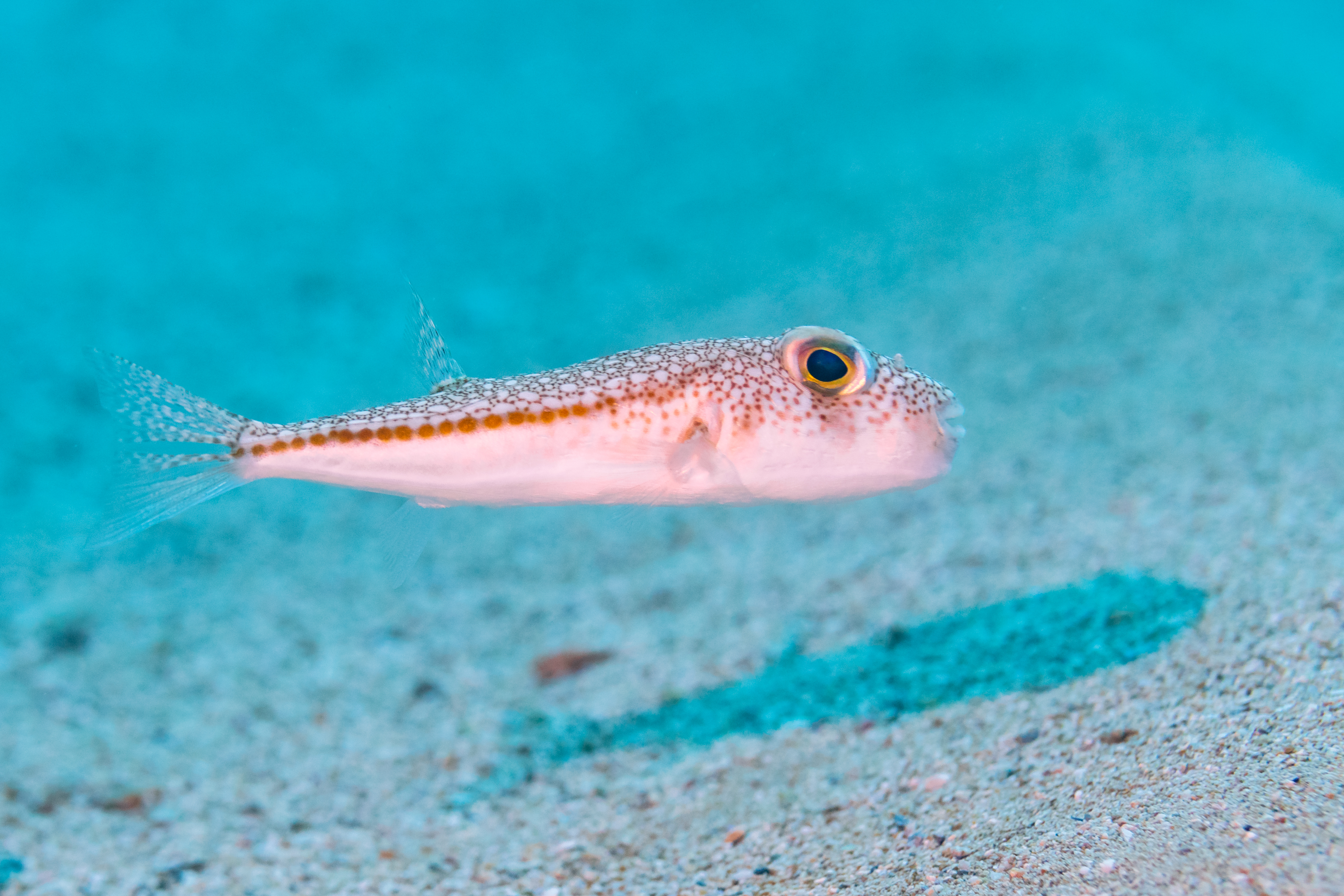

Scientific classification
- Kingdom: Animalia
- Phylum: Chordata
- Class: Actinopterygii
- Division: Teleostei
- Order: Tetraodontiformes
- Family: Tetraodontidae
- Genus: Torquigener
- Species: T. flavimaculosus

Binomial name
- Torquigener flavimaculosus Hardy & Randall, 1983

= Torquigener flavimaculosus =

Species of fish

Torquigener flavimaculosus is a pufferfish of the family Tetraodontidae, capable of very rapid body inflation when threatened. Native to the Western Indian Ocean, it is also found in the Indo Pacific from the Persian Gulf to the Seychelles. Recorded first in the Mediterranean Sea in 1987, following a likely migration through the Suez Canal, it is now expanding westward.

T. flavimaculosus reaches a maximum total length of 16cm. The species is distinguished by numerous small brown spots arranged in rosette-like patterns around larger white spots on the dorsal surface, yellow-brown markings on the cheeks, a white belly, and pale fins. It also possesses small dermal spinules extending from the region between the nasal organs to the origin of the dorsal fins.

Like other pufferfishes, the species is considered venomous and is of no commercial importance of fisheries. The International Union for Conservation of Nature (IUCN) currently classifies T. flavimaculosus as a species of Least Concern due to its wide distribution and the absence of major known threats.

Biology

Recent research has shown that Torquigener flavimaculosus displays negative allometric growth. Females were found to hive higher body mass and larger energy reserves than males, as indicated by higher hepatosomatic index values. Reproduction occurs during late winter to early spring, peaking in February and declining though April.

Impacts

The species can influence the fishing practices and operational costs of small-scale fisheries. Interviews conducted with professional fishers in Greece showed that the species is frequently caught as bycatch and is commonly regarded as harmful because of its toxicity and interactions with fishing gear. More than two-thirds of respondents reported gear damage attributed to the species with annual losses averaging about €960 (estimation), while approximately 25% reported changing fishing locations to reduce encounters with it.
