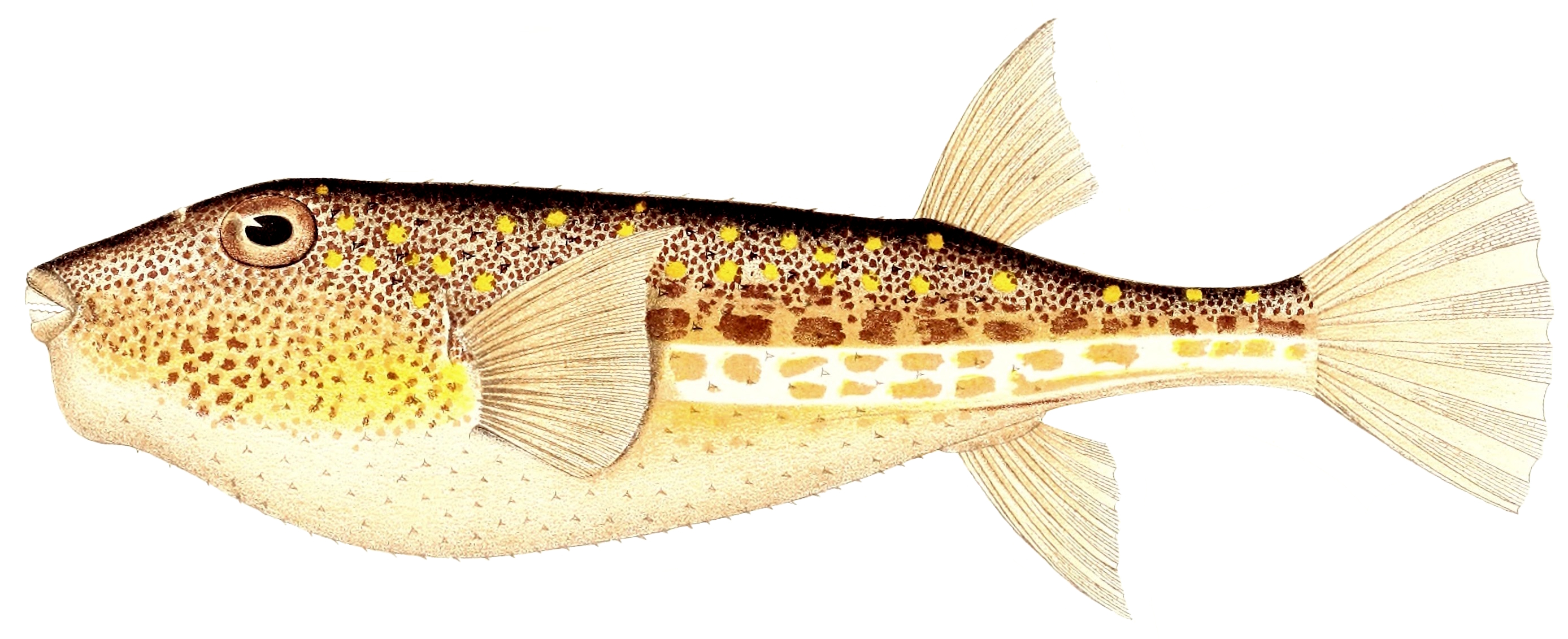

Scientific classification
- Kingdom: Animalia
- Phylum: Chordata
- Class: Actinopterygii
- Order: Tetraodontiformes
- Family: Tetraodontidae
- Genus: Torquigener
- Species: T. hypselogeneion

Binomial name
- Torquigener hypselogeneion (Bleeker, 1852)

= Torquigener hypselogeneion =

Species of fish

Torquigener hypselogeneion, commonly known as the orange-spotted toadfish, is a fish of the pufferfish family Tetraodontidae native to the Indian Ocean and northwestern Australia.
