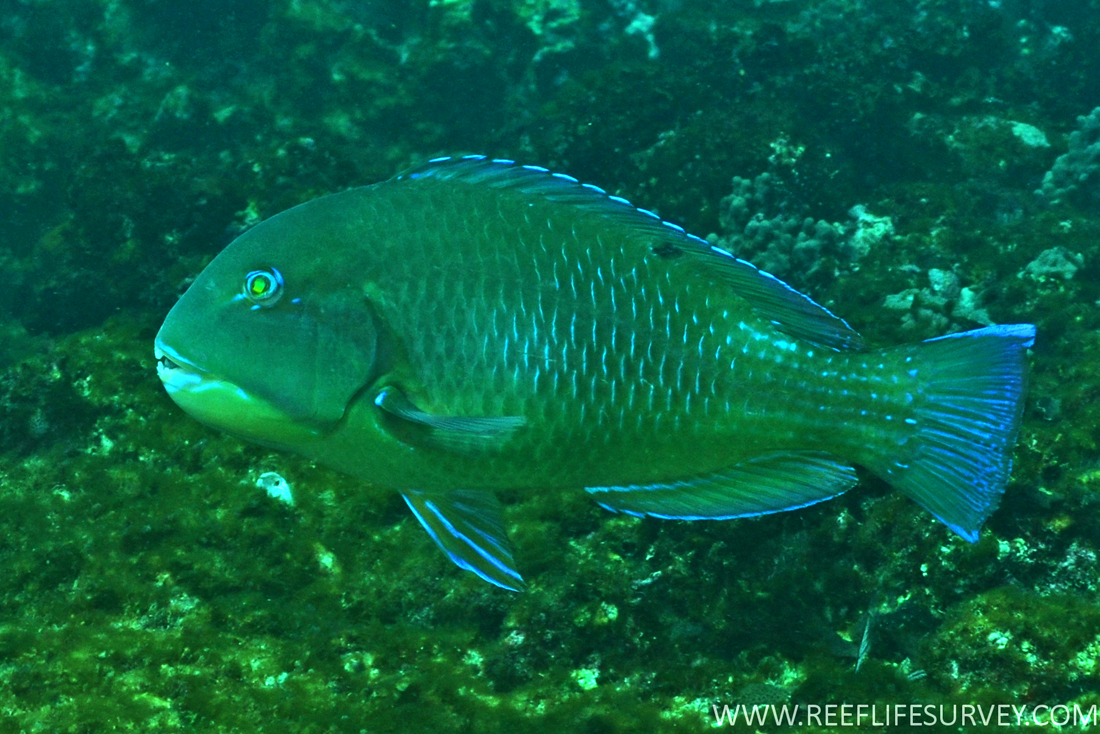

Conservation status
- Near Threatened (IUCN 3.1)

Scientific classification
- Kingdom: Animalia
- Phylum: Chordata
- Class: Actinopterygii
- Order: Labriformes
- Family: Labridae
- Genus: Choerodon
- Species: C. schoenleinii

Binomial name
- Choerodon schoenleinii (Valenciennes, 1839)

Synonyms
- Cossyphus schoenleinii Valenciennes, 1839; Cossyphus cyanostolus J. Richardson, 1846; Choerodon cyanostolus (J. Richardson, 1846); Cossyphus ommopterus J. Richardson, 1846; Choerops unimaculatus Cartier, 1874; Torresia australis Castelnau, 1875; Chaerops notatus Alleyne & Macleay, 1877; Torresia lineata De Vis, 1885; Choerops nyctemblema D. S. Jordan & Evermann, 1902; Choerodon rubidus T. D. Scott, 1959; Choerodon quadrifasciatus M. J. Yu, 1968

= Blackspot tuskfish =

Species of wrasse

The blackspot tuskfish (Choerodon schoenleinii) is a wrasse native to the Indian Ocean and the western Pacific Ocean from Mauritius to Indonesia and Australia north to the Ryukyu Islands. This species occurs on reefs, preferring areas with sandy substrates or areas of weed growth. It can be found at depths from 10 to 60 m (33 to 197 ft), though rarely deeper than 20 m (66 ft). It can reach 100 cm (39 in) in TL, and the greatest published weight for this species is 15.5 kg (34 lb). It is important to local commercial fisheries and is also farmed. It is popular as a game fish, in particular with spearfishers, and can be found in the aquarium trade.

In Hong Kong, its Cantonese name (Chinese: 青衣), has been given to Tsing Yi island.

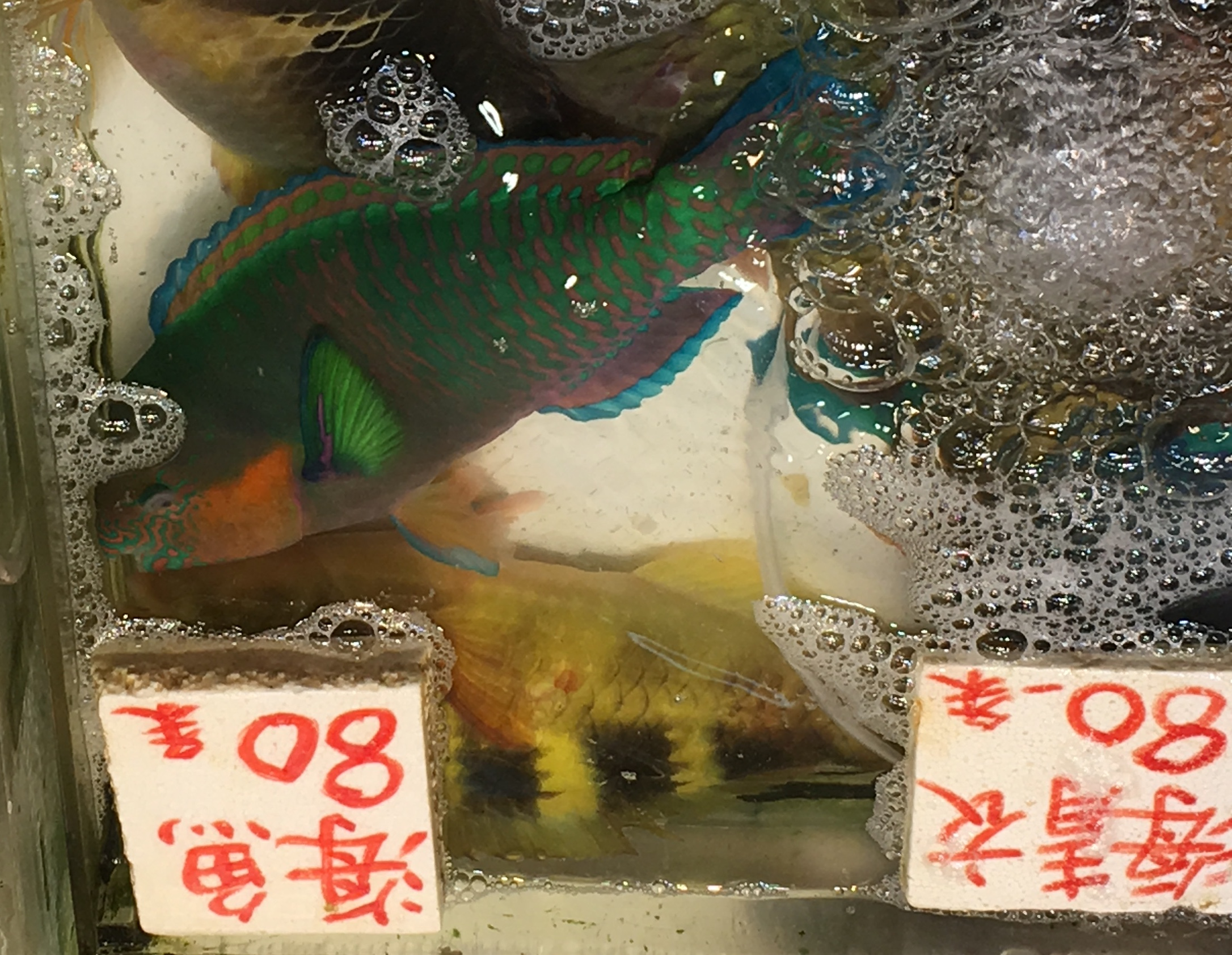
Blackspot tuskfish being sold as food while still alive in a market on Tsing Yi, the island mentioned in the text above. However, the fish are unlikely to be caught near the island, as the current marine environment around the island is too poor for them to live in because of urban development.

== Etymology ==
The fish is named in honor of Johann Lucas Schönlein (1793-1864), the German naturalist and professor of medicine.

== Documentation of tool use ==
In July 2011, a professional diver photographed a blackspot tuskfish bashing a clam on a rock to break the shell, apparently a use of the rock as a tool, the first documented example of tool use in wild fish.
