= Torquigener balteus =

Scientific classification
- Domain: Eukaryota
- Kingdom: Animalia
- Phylum: Chordata
- Class: Actinopterygii
- Order: Tetraodontiformes
- Family: Tetraodontidae
- Genus: Torquigener
- Species: T. balteus

Binomial name
- Torquigener balteus Hardy, 1989

Species of fish

Torquigener balteus, commonly known as the slender blaasop, is a fish of the pufferfish family Tetraodontidae native to the Western Indian Ocean.
