= James Douglas Ogilby =

Australian ichthyologist and herpetologist

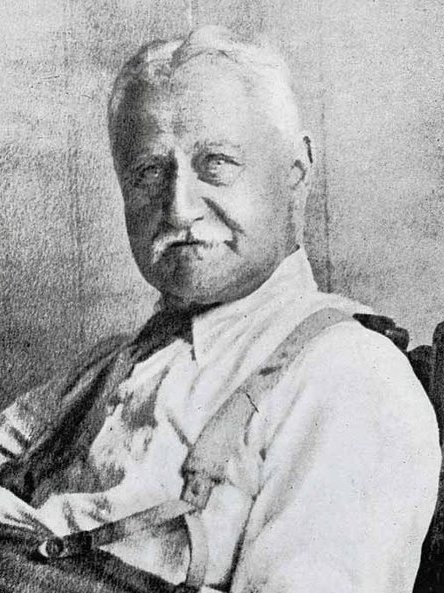
- Born: 16 February 1853; Belfast, Ireland
- Died: 11 August 1925 (aged 72); Brisbane, Australia
- Occupations: ichthyologist, herpetologist

James Douglas Ogilby (16 February 1853 – 11 August 1925) was an Australian ichthyologist and herpetologist.

Ogilby was born in Belfast, Ireland, and was the son of zoologist William Ogilby and his wife Adelaide, née Douglas. He received his education at Winchester College, England, and Trinity College, Dublin.

Ogilby worked for the British Museum before joining the Australian Museum in Sydney. After being let go for drunkenness in 1890, he picked up contract work before joining the Queensland Museum in Brisbane circa 1903.

He was the author of numerous scientific papers on reptiles, and he described a new species of turtle and several new species of lizards.

== Death ==
Ogilby died on 11 August 1925 at the Diamantina Hospital in Brisbane and was buried at Toowong Cemetery.

== Legacy ==
Numerous species of fish were named in Ogilby's honor:

- Callionymus ogilbyi (Rayfinned Fish)
- Calliurichthys ogilbyi (Ogilby’s Stinkfish)
- Cynoglossus ogilbyi (Tongue Sole)
- Cypsilurus ogilbyi (Ogilby’s Flyingfish)
- Hydrolagus ogilbyi (Ogilby’s Ghostshark)
- Hoplichthys ogilbyi (Ogilby’s Ghost Flathead)
- Melanotaenia ogilbyi (Ogilby’s Rainbowfish)
- Nebrodes concolor ogilbyi (Tawny Nurse Shark)
- Orectolobus ogilbyi (Ogilby’s Carpet Shark)
- Pranesus ogilbyi (Common Hardyhead)
- Scortum ogilbyi (Gulf Grunter)

In addition, an antelope (Cephalophus ogilbyi or Ogilby’s Duiker), a flatworm (Chimaericola ogilbyi) and an insect (Rheotanytarsus ogilbyi (Ogilby’s Midge) were named for him.

== See also ==
- Category:Taxa named by James Douglas Ogilby
