= Toadfish =

Common name used for fish

Toadfish is the common name for a variety of species from several different families of fish, usually because of their toad-like appearance or calls using their swimbladder.

Species referred to as toadfish

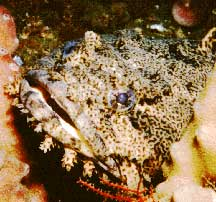
The oyster toadfish (Opsanus tau) is one of the Batrachoididae

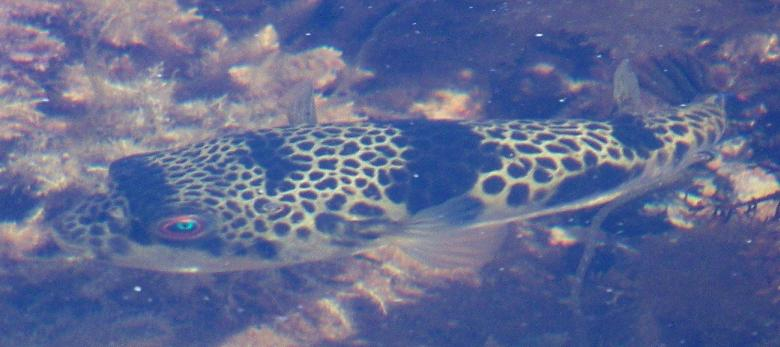
Smooth toadfish, Tetractenos glaber (Tetraodontidae)

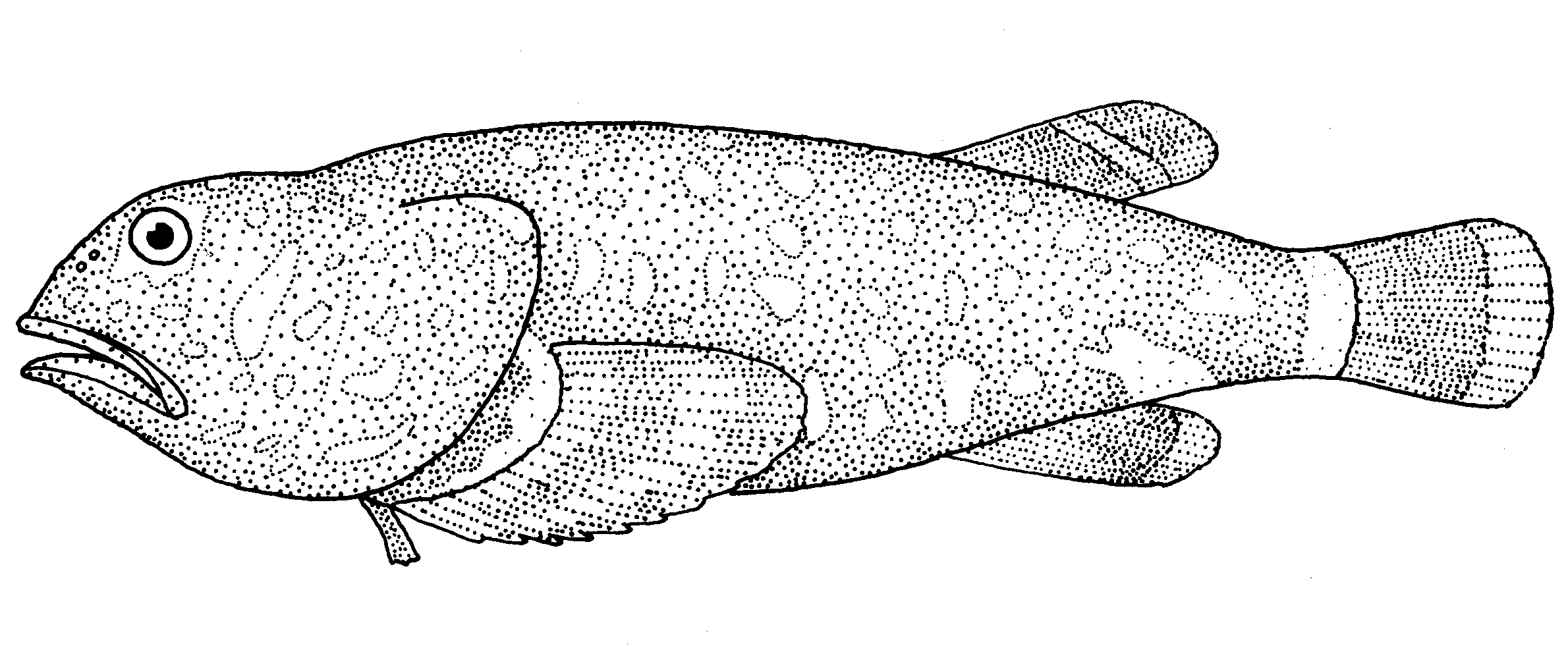
Dark toadfish, Neophrynichthys latus (Psychrolutidae)

== Batrachoididae ==
The entire family Batrachoididae are typically called toadfishes. They are benthic ambush predators, known for their ability to produce sound with their swim bladders; the midshipmen are especially well-known for this ability.

== Tetraodontidae ==
The name toadfish is applied to some species of the family Tetraodontidae, including:

- The banded toadfish, Torquigener pleurogramma (Australia)
- The blackspotted toadfish, Arothron nigropunctatus (tropical Indian and Pacific Oceans)
- The common toadfish (or toadfish), Tetractenos hamiltoni (Australia and New Zealand)
- The prickly toadfish, shared by Contusus richei (Australia and New Zealand) and Contusus brevicaudus (Australia)
- The red striped toadfish, Tetraodon erythrotaenia (Indonesia and Papua New Guinea)
- The silver-cheeked toadfish, Lagocephalus sceleratus (tropical Indian and Pacific Oceans, invasive in the Mediterranean Sea)
- The smooth toadfish, Tetractenos glaber (Australia)

== Psychrolutidae ==
The name toadfish is also applied to some sculpin species of the family Psychrolutidae:

- The dark toadfish, Neophrynichthys latus (New Zealand)
- The frilled toadfish, Ambophthalmos magnicirrus (Macquarie Island)
- The pale toadfish, Ambophthalmos angustus (New Zealand)

== Gobiidae ==
- The toadfish goby, Cryptopsilotris batrachodes (Atlantic Ocean)

== See also ==
- Frogfish and Frog-fish, types of anglerfish
- Toadie Rebecchi, Australian soap opera character nicknamed "Toadfish"
