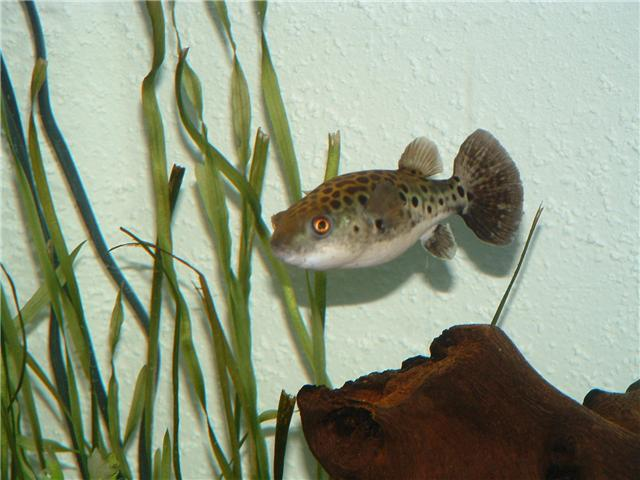

Scientific classification
- Domain: Eukaryota
- Kingdom: Animalia
- Phylum: Chordata
- Class: Actinopterygii
- Order: Tetraodontiformes
- Family: Tetraodontidae
- Genus: Dichotomyctere
- Species: D. sabahensis

Binomial name
- Dichotomyctere sabahensis (Dekkers, 1975)

Synonyms
- Tetraodon sabahensis

= Dichotomyctere sabahensis =

Species of fish

Dichotomyctere sabahensis is a species of pufferfish endemic to the southeast Asian island of Borneo. This species grows to a standard length of 10.8 cm (4.3 in).

It is also called the giant spotted puffer or the Saba puffer. The juvenile looks much like the spotted green pufferfish (D. nigroviridis), and both can live 15 years in an aquarium. Though the giant green spotted puffer seems to prefer a much lower salinity as an adult. It is safe to keep D. sabahensis at a salinity of 1.004 or half-brackish.
