= TSR3 =

Hypothetical human protein

Identifiers
- Aliases: TSR3, C16orf42, acp transferase ribosome maturation factor, TSR3 ribosome maturation factor, HsTsr3
- External IDs: OMIM: 617058; MGI: 1915577; GeneCards: TSR3
Enzyme activity
| EC # | BRENDA | ExPASy | KEGG | MetaCyc |
|---|---|---|---|---|
| 2.5.1.157 | ↗ | ↗ | ↗ | ↗ |

Gene location (Human)
| Chr. | Chromosome 16 (human) |
| Band | 16p13.3 | Start | 1,349,240 bp |
| Band | 16p13.3 | End | 1,351,878 bp |

Gene location (Mouse)
| Chr. | Chromosome 17 (mouse) |
| Band | 17|17 A3.3 | Start | 25,240,170 bp |
| Band | 17|17 A3.3 | End | 25,242,798 bp |
RNA expression pattern
| Bgee | Human / Mouse (ortholog); Top expressed in: tendon of biceps brachii; apex of heart; internal globus pallidus; left ventricle; mucosa of transverse colon; putamen; C1 segment; muscle of thigh; amygdala; gastrocnemius muscle / Top expressed in: otic placode; embryo; otic vesicle; embryo; facial motor nucleus; ventricular zone; right kidney; epiblast; muscle of thigh; saccule; More reference expression data |
| BioGPS | n/a |
Gene ontology
| Molecular function | transferase activity |
| Cellular component | cytosol |
| Biological process | rRNA processing; maturation of SSU-rRNA; ribosome biogenesis; rRNA modification |
Sources:Amigo / QuickGO
Orthologs
| Databases | NCBI: entry; OMA: entry |
| Species | Human | Mouse |
| Entrez | 115939 | 68327 |
| Ensembl | ENSG00000007520 | ENSMUSG00000015126 |
| UniProt | Q9UJK0 | Q5HZH2 |
| RefSeq (mRNA) | NM_001001410 | NM_001163718; NM_026676 |
| RefSeq (protein) | NP_001001410 | NP_001157190; NP_080952 |
| Location (UCSC) | Chr 16: 1.35 – 1.35 Mb | Chr 17: 25.24 – 25.24 Mb |
| PubMed search |
- Wikidata
| View/Edit Human | View/Edit Mouse |

TSR3, or TSR3 Ribosome Maturation Factor, is a hypothetical human protein found on chromosome 16. Its protein is 312 amino acids long and its cDNA has 1214 base pairs. It was previously designated C16orf42.

== Function ==
The function of C16orf42 is unknown. It is predicted to be a transmembrane protein, however the cellular or subcellular membrane in which is resides is as well unknown.

== Homology ==
C16orf42 can also be found in many other organisms, including mammals, and certain fungi and plants. It is not found in bacteria. C16orf42 is highly conserved in many of its orthologs, especially its mammalian orthologs, as high as 95% identity in rhesus monkeys. It also has fairly high conservation in its more distant homologs, 53% identity in corn for example. It has one potential human paralog, the protein EGFL6.

Ortholog Analysis:

| Genus and species | Common name | NCBI accession | Length | Identity | Similarity |
|---|---|---|---|---|---|
| Macaca mulatta | Rhesus monkey | XP_001088384 | 312 aa | 95% | 96% |
| Bos taurus | Cattle | NP_001092381 | 315 aa | 82% | 87% |
| Canis familiaris | Dog | XP_537015 | 312 aa | 79% | 85% |
| Equus caballus | Horse | XP_001915599 | 324 aa | 78% | 83% |
| Rattus norvegicus | Rat | EMD03916 | 324 aa | 73% | 80% |
| Mus musculus | Mouse | NP_080952 | 323 aa | 73% | 80% |
| Gallus gallus | Chicken | XP_414890 | 311 aa | 63% | 76% |
| Danio rerio | Zebra fish | NP_001002370 | 297 aa | 62% | 75% |
| Tetraodon nigroviridis | Green spotted puffer | CAG04371 | 247 aa | 62% | 74% |
| Trichoplax adhaerens | Trichoplax | XP_002118089 | 284 aa | 46% | 64% |
| Ciona intestinalis | Sea squirt | XP_002129931 | 265 aa | 52% | 68% |
| Ornithorhynchus anatinus | Platypus | XP_001517034 | 285 aa | 74% | 85% |
| Hydra magnipapillata | Hydra | XP_002161680 | 232 aa | 55% | 71% |
| Aedes aegypti | Yellow fever mosquito | XP_001654463 | 269 aa | 52% | 70% |
| Drosophila melanogaster | Fruit fly | NP_650441 | 274 aa | 54% | 70% |
| Apis mellifera | Western honey bee | XP_625167 | 258 aa | 50% | 69% |
| Debaryomyces hansenii | Marine yeast | XP_461733 | 333 aa | 49% | 64% |
| Aspergillus oryzae | Mold | XP_001818982 | 374 aa | 50% | 69% |
| Saccharomyces cerevisiae | Yeast | NP_014648 | 313 aa | 52% | 68% |
| Zea mays | Corn | ACG47566 | 271 aa | 53% | 69% |
| Caenorhabditis elegans | C. elegans | NP_741332 | 261 aa | 47% | 65% |

== Expression ==
C16orf42 is not expressed ubiquitously in humans. It is most highly expressed in the ovary, but not expressed at all in the blood and very little in the brain. One microarray experiment suggested that malaria causes its expression in the blood, but further experimentation is needed to support this claim. Its expression in tissues tends to remain constant when the tissue is diseased. However, a brief analysis of its orthologs show inconsistencies in tissue expression. This could be due to a lack of research of this protein in other species.

== Structure ==
The structure of C16orf42 is unknown. It is predicted to have multiple regions of alpha-helices, and a few short stretches of beta-strands. It contains a potential metal binding domain between amino acids 60–90. It has a predicted molecular weight of 33.6 kdal and an isoelectric point of 6.496000, making it slightly acidic. Compared to other human proteins, C16orf42 is high in the amino acids arginine and alanine, and low in the amino acid threonine. A brief analysis of its strict orthologs show that they too are generally high in arginine and low in threonine as well as compared to the typical protein in their respective species.
