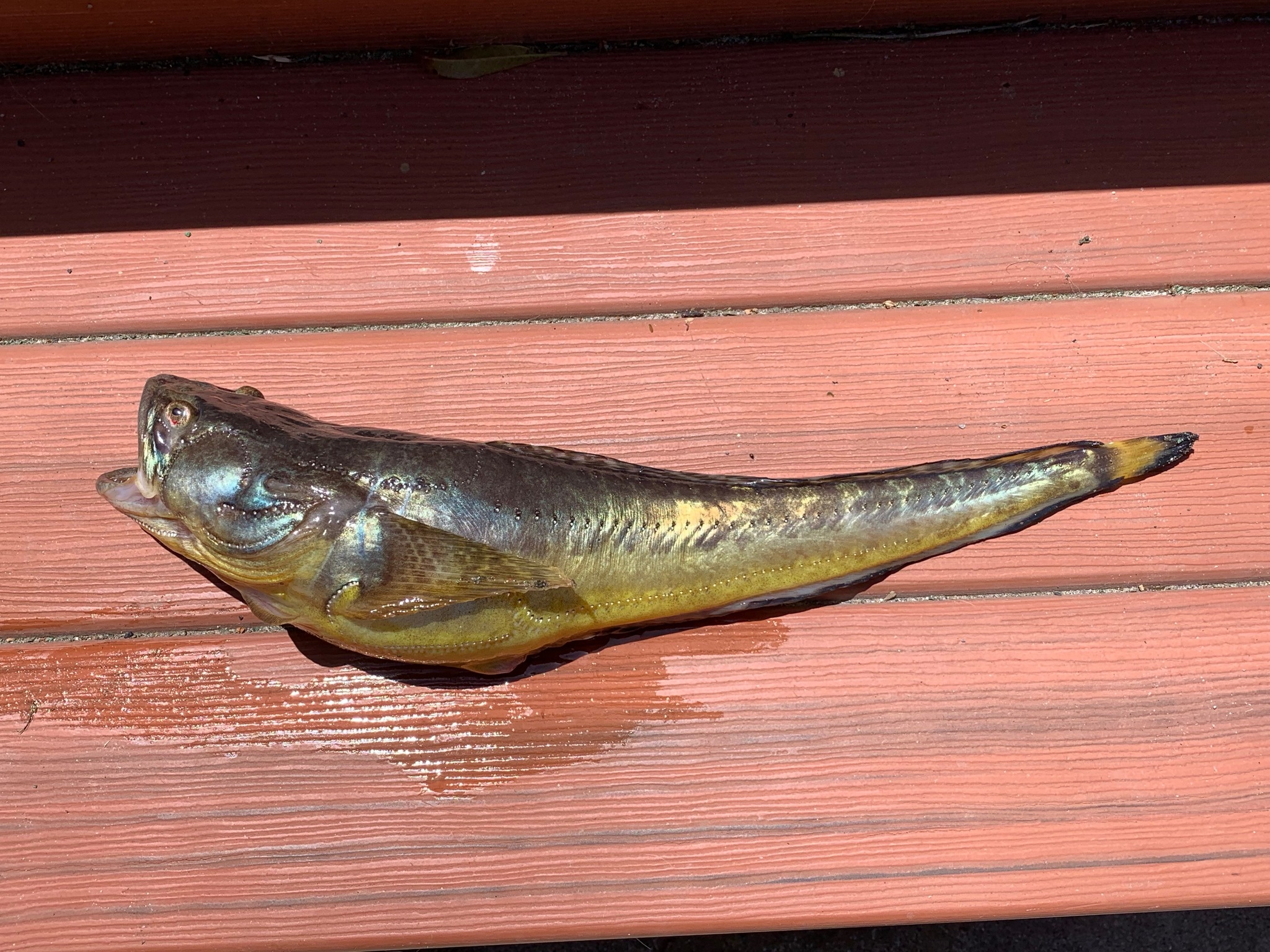

Conservation status
- Least Concern (IUCN 3.1)

Scientific classification
- Kingdom: Animalia
- Phylum: Chordata
- Class: Actinopterygii
- Order: Batrachoidiformes
- Family: Batrachoididae
- Genus: Porichthys
- Species: P. myriaster

Binomial name
- Porichthys myriaster Hubbs & Schultz, 1939

= Porichthys myriaster =

Species of fish

Porichthys myriaster, commonly known as specklefin midshipman, is a species of toad fish in the family Batrachoididae.

== Description ==
Porichthys myriaster can grow to 51 cm in length.

== Distribution and habitat ==
Porichthys myriaster is found from the intertidal zone to 126 m depth in the eastern Pacific, from California, USA to northern Peru. It inhabits both rocky areas and soft bottoms and is common in bays.

== Ecology and behaviour ==
Porichthys myriaster will often rest on or bury itself in the soft bottom sediments. It can create a humming or grunting sound and is more active during the nighttime.
