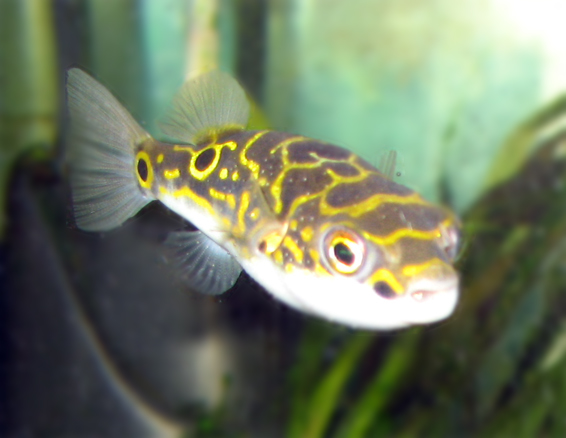

Conservation status
- Data Deficient (IUCN 3.1)

Scientific classification
- Kingdom: Animalia
- Phylum: Chordata
- Class: Actinopterygii
- Order: Tetraodontiformes
- Family: Tetraodontidae
- Genus: Dichotomyctere
- Species: D. ocellatus

Binomial name
- Dichotomyctere ocellatus (Steindachner, 1870)

Synonyms
- Tetraodon biocellatus Tirant, 1885

= Dichotomyctere ocellatus =

Species of fish

Dichotomyctere ocellatus (syn. Tetraodon biocellatus), commonly the figure 8 puffer or eyespot puffer, is a pufferfish found in freshwater in Southeast Asia. It is known from the lower reaches of the Mekong (Cambodia), the Peninsular Malaysia as well as Borneo (Sarawak, Kalimantan).

== Characteristics ==
Figure 8 puffers grow to about 8 cm (3.1 in) total length (TL). They are colourful fish, with greenish yellow patterns on their backs. These patterns vary greatly from fish to fish, but the markings either side of the caudal fin resemble the number eight, or eye-spots (earning the species another common name as "eyespot puffer"). Figure 8 puffers are relatively peaceful among Tetraodontidae, and have been kept successfully with other fish such as bumblebee gobies and mollies, but as with all pufferfish there is a risk that tankmates will not be tolerated.

Like all members of its family, the figure 8 puffer is capable of inflating itself with water or air when stressed or otherwise frightened.

== In freshwater ==
Like the closely related green pufferfish, the figure 8 exhibits euryhalinity, and undergoes epithelial remodeling and changes in the kidneys and gills when exposed to changes in salinity. Accordingly, the figure 8 puffer is often mistakenly regarded as an entirely freshwater fish, and has considerable resistance to freshwater exposure. In a marine environment, it exhibits typical saltwater fish morphological features in its gills, allowing it to secrete sodium chloride across the gill epithelium like a typical saltwater fish. However, acclimated to freshwater, the figure 8 puffer will exhibit specialized cells that do not match any gill ion-regulating cell of a freshwater fish. The other fish known to have these types of cells is the Mozambique tilapia (O. mossambicus).

== In the aquarium ==
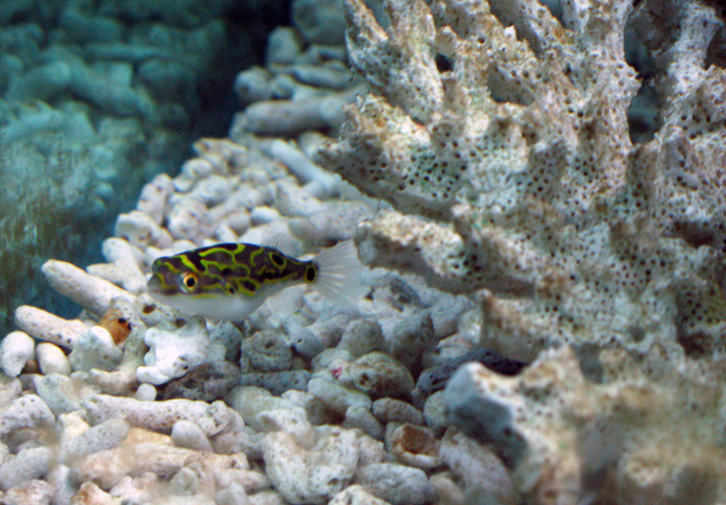
Dichotomyctere ocellatus feeding on krill in an aquarium

In captivity, figure 8 puffers require a 15 US gallon tank with temperatures between 24 °C and 28 °C. They are sensitive to nitrites and nitrates and must be introduced into a fully cycled aquarium. Over-filtration is recommended as well as frequent partial water changes. Water pH will reflect the brackish environment to which these fish are best suited; the addition of marine salt will buffer the pH to a range between 7.8 and 8.3. With a salinity of between 1.005 and 1.008 specific gravity (S.G.), the lifespan of this species has been as long as 15 years. As with all puffer fish, they require a complex aquarium set up consisting of many nooks and crannies. This helps figure 8 puffers to behave as they would in nature, and reduce boredom.

=== Diet ===
A figure 8 puffer with visibly overgrown teeth.

Pufferfish are classed as molluscivores and feed mainly on benthic organisms which may include mussels, cockles, oysters and krill, though some puffers will take other foods, such as flake, it is not recommended that their primary food is flake. Their teeth, a beak formed from two plates, are capable of crushing shells in order to feed on prey. In captivity many fishkeepers feed snails as a substitute for the aforementioned foods as snails help keep the beak trim; it would otherwise be susceptible to overgrowth.

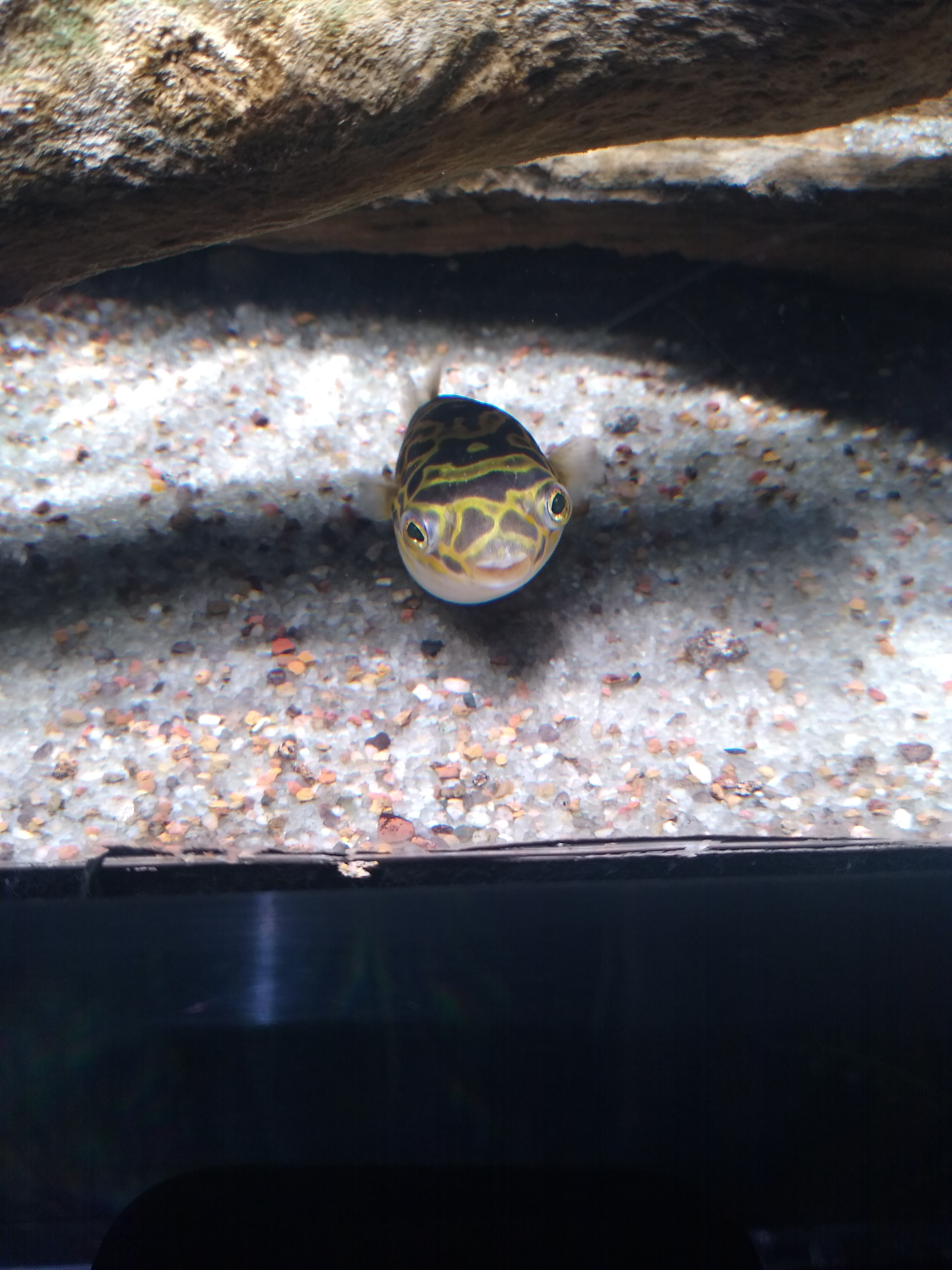
Eyespot puffer at the Dallas Children's Aquarium

== Bibliography ==
Ebert, K. (2001), The Puffers of Fresh and Brackish Water, p 19. Aqualog, ISBN 3-931702-60-X.
