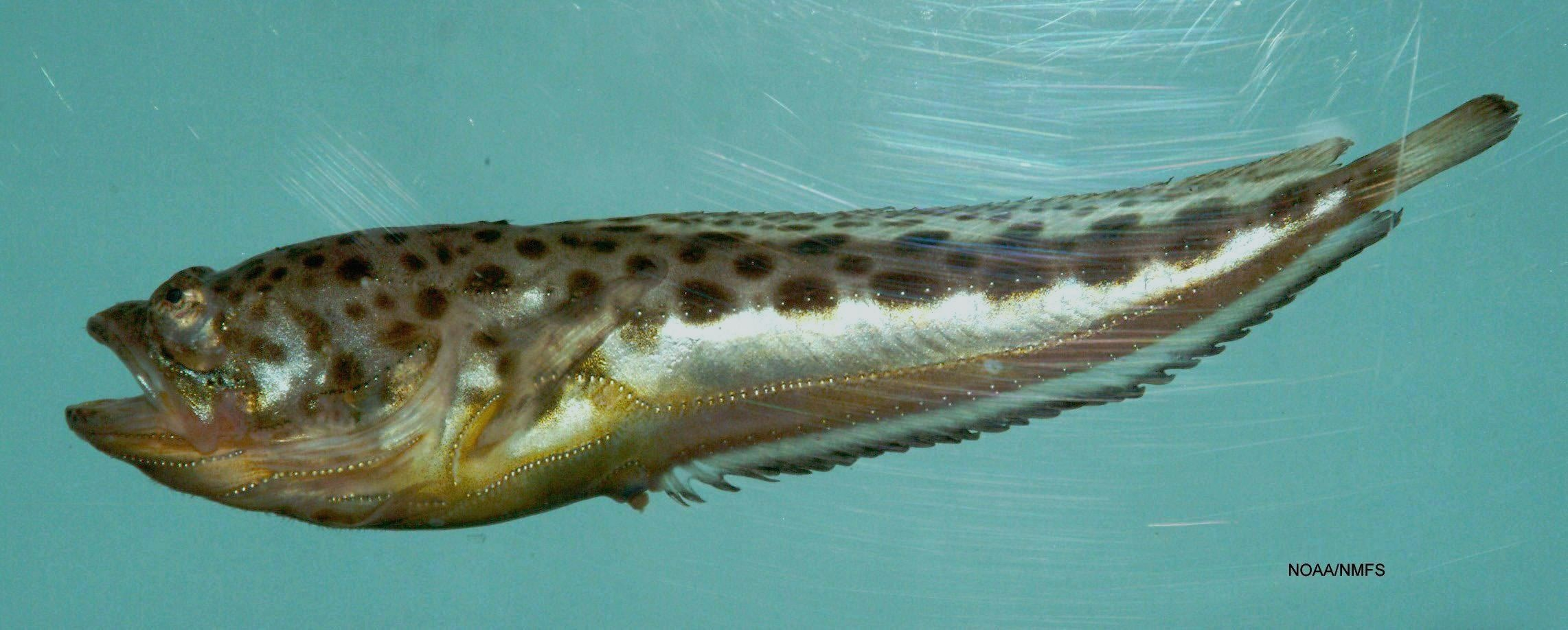

Conservation status
- Least Concern (IUCN 3.1)

Scientific classification
- Kingdom: Animalia
- Phylum: Chordata
- Class: Actinopterygii
- Order: Batrachoidiformes
- Family: Batrachoididae
- Genus: Porichthys
- Species: P. plectrodon

Binomial name
- Porichthys plectrodon Jordan & Gilbert, 1882

= Porichthys plectrodon =

Atlantic midshipman

Species of fish

Porichthys plectrodon, commonly known as Atlantic midshipman, is a species of toad fish in the family Batrachoididae.
