= Dichotomyctere kretamensis =

Scientific classification
- Domain: Eukaryota
- Kingdom: Animalia
- Phylum: Chordata
- Class: Actinopterygii
- Order: Tetraodontiformes
- Family: Tetraodontidae
- Genus: Dichotomyctere
- Species: D. kretamensis

Binomial name
- Dichotomyctere kretamensis (Inger, 1953)

Synonyms
- Tetraodon kretamensis

Species of fish

Dichotomyctere kretamensis is a species of freshwater pufferfish known only from northern Borneo.

== Discovery ==
The type specimen of this species was deposited at the Field Museum (Specimen No.51558). It was collected on May 10, 1950 by Robert F. Inger from the Pinang River in the Kinabatangan District of North Borneo. Paratypes were also deposited at the Field Museum. They include specimen No. 51559 collected from the type locality, specimen No. 51562 collected from the Gaja River, specimen Nos. 51560-1 collected from the Kretam Kechil River and specimen no. 51563 from a tributary of the Gaja River.

== Description ==
In life Dichotomyctere kretamensis is olive green in color dorsally and laterally with round and oblong spots of varying sizes. Most specimens exhibit a black occipital chevron and a partially interrupted ventro-lateral black stripe running from the mouth below the eye and the pectoral fin that fades as it extends back to the vent. The ventral surface otherwise is white. Fins are unmarked and the caudal fin (tail) is dusky. Based on the few specimens that have been measured, this fish has a maximum length of 4.5 centimetres (1.8 in).
