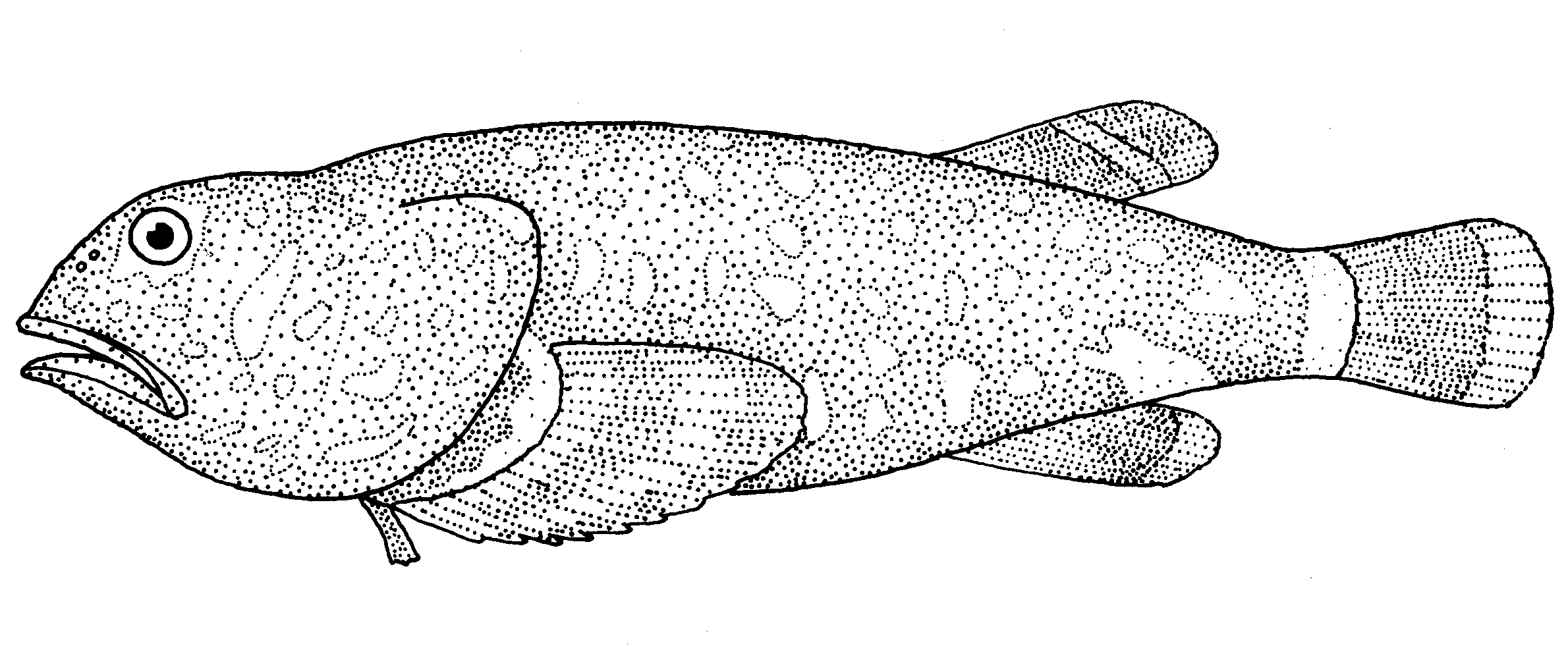
- Dark toadfish (N. latus)

Scientific classification
- Kingdom: Animalia
- Phylum: Chordata
- Class: Actinopterygii
- Order: Perciformes
- Suborder: Cottoidei
- Family: Psychrolutidae
- Genus: Neophrynichthys; Günther, 1876

Type species
- Psychrolutes latus F. W. Hutton, 1875

= Neophrynichthys =

Genus of fishes

Neophrynichthys is a small genus of marine ray-finned fishes belonging to the family Psychrolutidae, the fatheads. These fishes are found in the southwestern Pacific Ocean waters around New Zealand.

== Species ==
There are currently two recognized species in this genus:

- Neophrynichthys heterospilos K. L. Jackson & J. S. Nelson, 2000
- Neophrynichthys latus (F. W. Hutton, 1875) (Dark toadfish)
