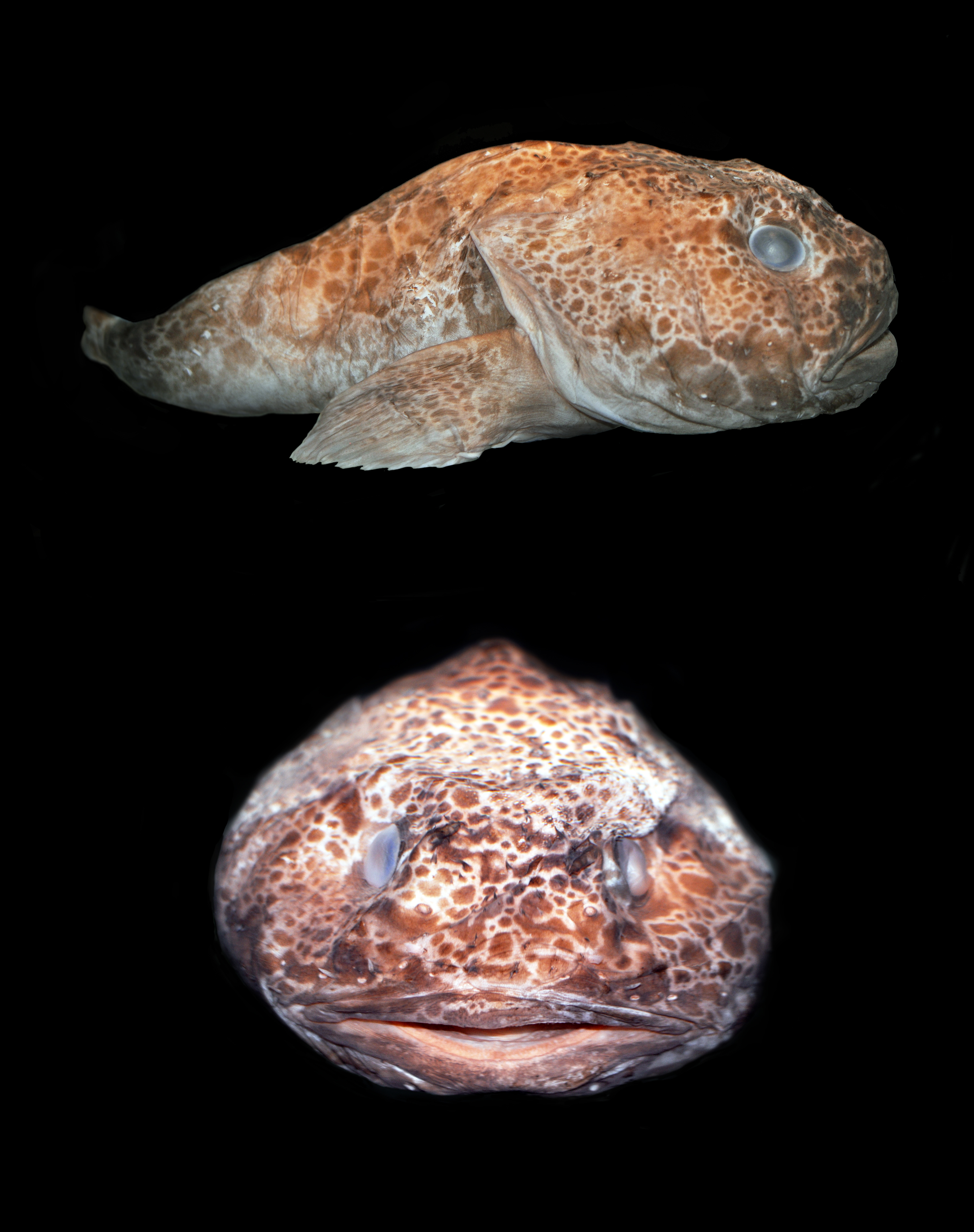
- Pale toadfish (A. angustus)

Scientific classification
- Domain: Eukaryota
- Kingdom: Animalia
- Phylum: Chordata
- Class: Actinopterygii
- Order: Perciformes
- Suborder: Cottoidei
- Family: Psychrolutidae
- Genus: Ambophthalmos; K. L. Jackson & J. S. Nelson, 1998

Type species
- Neophrynichthys angustus J. S. Nelson, 1977

= Ambophthalmos =

Genus of fishes

Ambophthalmos is a genus of marine ray-finned fish belonging to the family Psychrolutidae. These fishes are found in the southwestern Pacific Ocean.

== Species ==
There are currently three recognized species in this genus:

- Ambophthalmos angustus (J. S. Nelson, 1977) (Pale toadfish)
- Ambophthalmos eurystigmatephoros K. L. Jackson & J. S. Nelson, 1999
- Ambophthalmos magnicirrus (J. S. Nelson, 1977) (Frilled toadfish)
