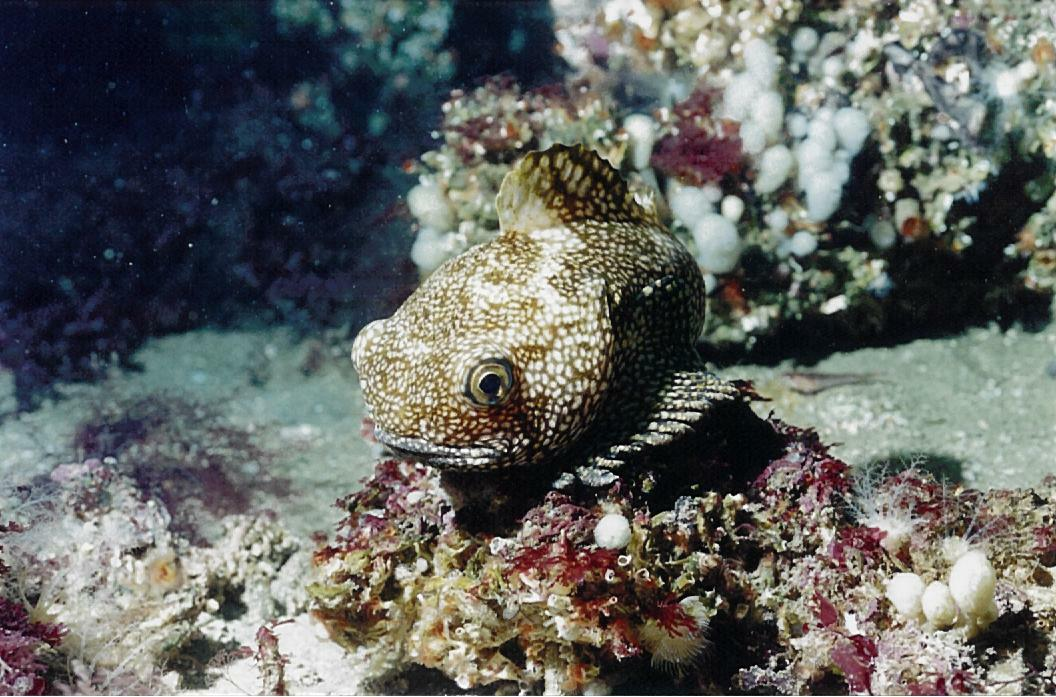
- A dark toadfish observed near Stewart Island

Scientific classification
- Kingdom: Animalia
- Phylum: Chordata
- Class: Actinopterygii
- Order: Perciformes
- Suborder: Cottoidei
- Family: Psychrolutidae
- Genus: Neophrynichthys
- Species: N. latus

Binomial name
- Neophrynichthys latus (F. W. Hutton, 1875)

Synonyms
- Psychrolutes latus Hutton, 1875

= Dark toadfish =

Species of fish

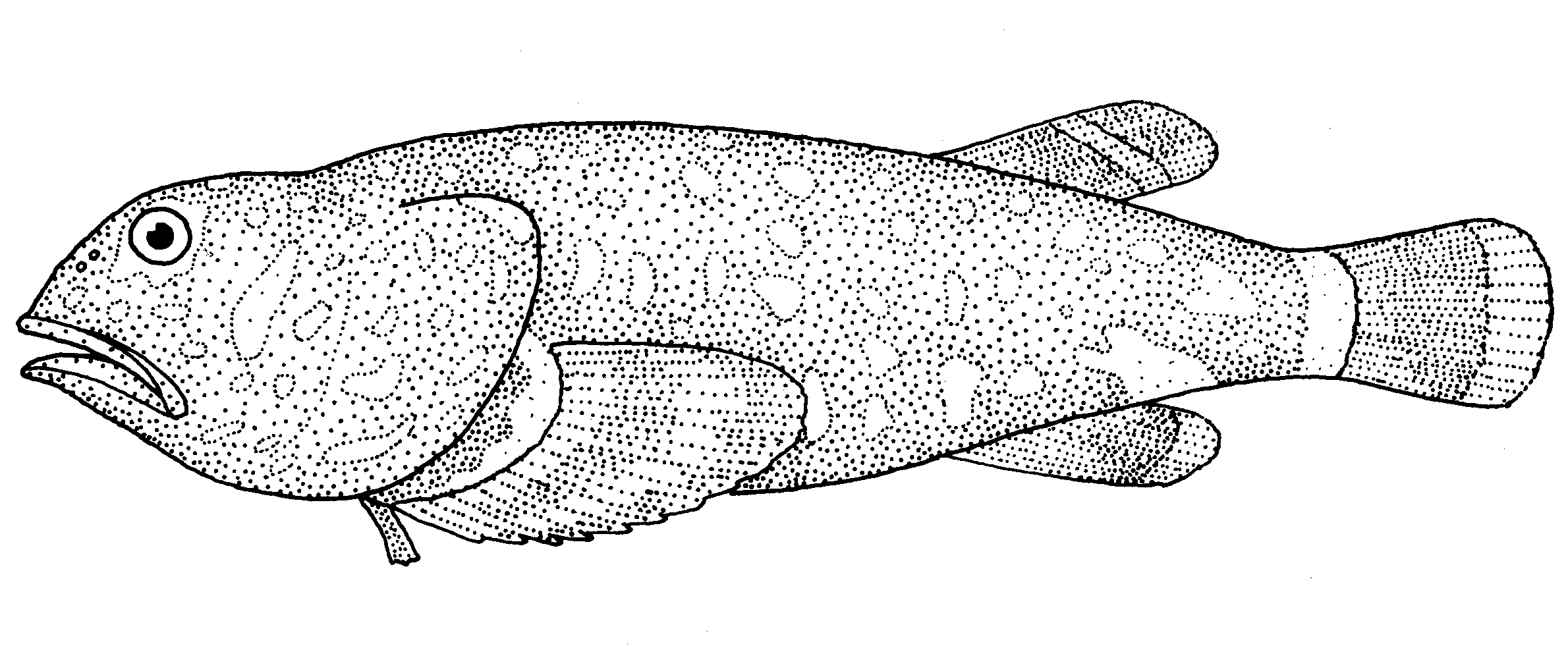
Drawing by Dr Tony Ayling

The dark toadfish (Neophrynichthys latus) is a species of marine ray-finned fish belonging to the family Psychrolutidae, the fatheads and toadfishes. This fish is found on the continental shelf around New Zealand.
