= Ambophthalmos eurystigmatephoros =

Scientific classification
- Kingdom: Animalia
- Phylum: Chordata
- Class: Actinopterygii
- Order: Perciformes
- Suborder: Cottoidei
- Family: Psychrolutidae
- Genus: Ambophthalmos
- Species: A. eurystigmatephoros

Binomial name
- Ambophthalmos eurystigmatephoros K. L. Jackson & J. S. Nelson, 1999

Species of fish

Ambophthalmos eurystigmatephoros is a species of marine ray-finned fish belonging to the family Psychrolutidae. This species is found in the southwestern Pacific Ocean off Campbell Island, New Zealand at depths of 230 to 282 m (755 to 925 ft). Its body is tadpole-shaped, and they are between 23 and 26 centimeters long.
