= Contusus =

Scientific classification
- Domain: Eukaryota
- Kingdom: Animalia
- Phylum: Chordata
- Class: Actinopterygii
- Order: Tetraodontiformes
- Family: Tetraodontidae
- Subfamily: Tetraodontinae
- Genus: Contusus; Whitley, 1947

Species
- See text.

Genus of fishes

Contusus is a genus of pufferfishes native to the coastal waters of southern Australia and New Zealand.

== Species ==
There are currently two recognized species in this genus:

- Contusus brevicaudus Hardy, 1981
- Contusus richei (Fréminville, 1813) (Prickly toadfish)
