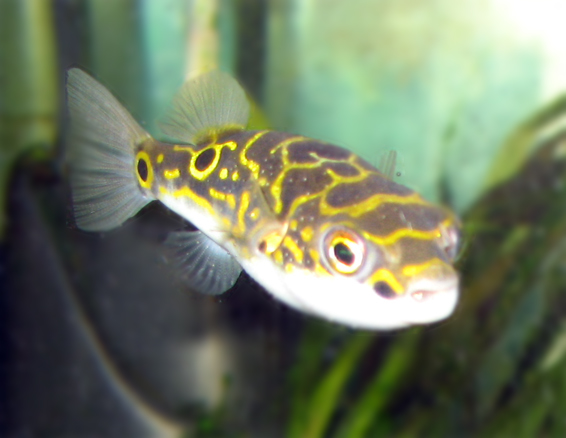
- Eyespot pufferfish, Dichotomyctere ocellatus

Scientific classification
- Kingdom: Animalia
- Phylum: Chordata
- Class: Actinopterygii
- Order: Tetraodontiformes
- Family: Tetraodontidae
- Subfamily: Tetraodontinae
- Genus: Dichotomyctere; Duméril, 1855

Type species
- Tetraodon fluviatilis F. Hamilton, 1822

= Dichotomyctere =

Genus of fishes

Dichotomyctere is a genus of relatively small pufferfish found in both fresh and brackish waters in south and southeast Asia. Its species were generally included in the genus Tetraodon until 2013. The largest species of Dichotomyctere reach up to 17 cm (6.7 in) in length.

== Species ==
There are currently 6 species in the genus:

- Dichotomyctere erythrotaenia (Bleeker, 1853) — Red-striped toadfish
- Dichotomyctere fluviatilis (F. Hamilton, 1822) — Green pufferfish
- Dichotomyctere kretamensis (Inger, 1953)
- Dichotomyctere nigroviridis (Marion de Procé, 1822) — Spotted green pufferfish
- Dichotomyctere ocellatus (Steindachner, 1870) — Eyespot pufferfish
- Dichotomyctere sabahensis (Dekkers, 1975) — Giant spotted pufferfish
