= Reproduction and vocalization in midshipman fish =

Reproduction and vocalization in midshipman fish are closely interlinked. Mating in midshipman fish depends on auditory communication, the production and reception of sound signals. Males produce several different vocalizations, while females only make grunts in non-breeding situations.

== Calling ==
Typical Type I male calls are divided into short grunts that last for milliseconds or are produced in a series of grunts called a "grunt train", mid-duration growls, and long duration advertisement hums that can last up to an hour. These calls can be recorded naturally. They can also be produced in a laboratory, a procedure known as "fictive calling". In nature, two muscles contracting on the swim bladder produce these sounds. In the laboratory, sounds are produced by a stimulating electrode placed on the periaqueductal gray (PAG) and a recording electrode placed on the occipital nerve that leads to the sonic muscles of the fish.

== Steroid mediation ==
The vocalizations of male midshipman fish are androgen and estradiol steroid mediated. There are high blood levels of these hormones during the transition from non-calling to calling before midshipman breeding season, suggesting that higher hormone levels are needed for making advertisement calls. Feeding 11-ketotestosterone coated scallops to toadfish increases their calling behavior, which identifies 11-ketotestosterone, an androgen hormone, as a mediator of midshipman fish vocalization. There are also high levels of aromatase, an estrogen-generating enzyme, in the hindbrain vocal motor region. Estradiol steroids and their receptors are present in the same areas already concluded to be involved in male midshipman calling.

There are three sexes of midshipman fish: females, type I males, and type II males. Type I and type II males have different reproductive strategies, and can be distinguished from each other based on physical characteristics. Type I males are eight times larger in body mass, and have much larger vocal organs. Type II males’ reproductive organs are seven times larger in size than those of type I males. Female and type II male midshipman fish can be distinguished from each other by the female's slightly larger size, and the type II male midshipman's large reproductive organs.

The three sexes of midshipman fish have different steroid-mediated reproductive behaviors. Type I territorial males use vocalizations via paired muscles in the swimming bladder to attract females, while type II males invest in larger reproductive organs. Type II males then “sneak” into nests because they look much like females and fertilize laid eggs. This behavior is referred to as cuckoldry or satellite-spawning. Type II males and females are incapable of long duration calls. 11-Ketotestosterone is the major steroid present in Type I males’ vocalization systems, while Type 2 males’ and females’ vocalizations are primarily mediated by testosterone. The specific mechanisms by which these steroids act are still unknown.

The sounds produced by male midshipman fish cause reproductive females to develop a hormone-mediated selective sensitivity to this sound, and they respond by laying eggs in the rock nest of a singing male. This selective sensitivity to higher frequency correlates to increased levels of testosterone and estradiol.

== Neuron connectivity ==
The neuronal pathway for midshipman vocalization starts at the ventral medullary nucleus and continues to a hindbrain vocal pattern generator, which contains both pre-pacemaker and pacemaker nuclei. For each action potential fired in their vocal pattern generator, there is exactly one sonic motor neuron that fires, and there is exactly one sound pulse. The two motor nuclei fire in phase in toadfish, leading to the paired contraction of the sonic muscles.

The duration of calls is controlled by the pre-pacemaker neurons in the hindbrain. The duration is encoded by a long depolarization of these pre-pacemaker neurons. Exposing pacemaker neurons to different levels of the anesthetic lidocaine alters the duration of the calls, but not the frequency Pacemaker neurons code for the frequency of signals using "ultrafast" rhythmic oscillations in membrane potential. As midbrain stimulus increased, the oscillations increased in amplitude.

== Implications for humans ==
Although midshipman fish have been known to awaken houseboat owners, research surrounding their vocalizations could be beneficial to humans. Midshipman fish are model organisms for studying both human speech and hearing. Recently, it was found that midshipman fish can decrease their own hearing sensitivity by stiffening their inner ear hair cells while they are vibrating their calling muscles. This behavior is also found in bats, and may lead to an understanding a similar mechanism humans use to turn down their ear sensitivity to retain their hearing longer. There are conserved patterns of vocal, auditory, and neuroendocrine mechanisms between teleosts and tetrapods, which include midshipman fish and humans, respectively. This model organisms’ simple system could lead to a deeper understanding of human speech and auditory pathways,. This evolutionary connection could be important in modern medicine because these fish have homologous brain structures to humans. An example is for patients with lesions in the brain that become mute after having a stroke.

On August 9, 1974, composer Charlie Morrow performed a concert for fish using what he understood to be decoded toadfish language, similar to his decoded field peeper language. Morrow observed that choruses of multiple toadfish shift leadership based on call and response by strong individuals. He notated the patterns for human performance, in one version numbering each individual for identification and spatial location. The night before, Richard Nixon resigned as U.S. president. Major media covered the concert. New York Times music critic, John Rockwell, wrote a review with the headline, "Fish Silent".

== Brain-behavior relationship ==
Midshipman fish have two forms of males: the nest-building Type I and "sneaker male" or "satellite male" Type II. Type I males attract females to their nests with their humming, coax them to lay eggs, and guard them. In contrast, Type II males do not build nests or attract females on their own. Instead, they sneak up to the Type I's nests and deposit their sperm on the eggs there. These behavioral differences can be seen in the differences in the structure and function of the nervous system.

=== Morph-specific vocal behavior ===
==== Neurons and Muscles ====
Type I males and Type II males and females grow along different growth paths when it comes to neurons and muscles that determine morph-specific vocal behavior. For Type I males, for example, sexual maturation is preceded by growth of the mate-calling circuit and sonic muscle. Specifically, before the transformation from juvenile to type I male, the size of the motoneurons and volume of the sonic motor nucleus increases twofold and the number of sonic muscle fibers increases fourfold. At the start of sexual maturation, the motoneurons increase in size again, although not as much as before. The pacemaker neurons also increase in size at this time but not as much as the motoneurons in general. The sonic muscle also increases fivefold in the size of muscle fibers. In contrast, there is little dramatic change seen before the transformation from juvenile to type II male or adult female. In fact, the vocal neurons and muscles change little or not at all.

==== Hormones ====
Differences between the reproductive strategies of Type I and Type II are also reflected in hormonal differences during sexual maturation. The three different morphs – Type I, Type II, and females – also produce different levels of various hormones. Type II males produce the highest levels of testosterone, followed by females and then Type I males. Females only have estrogen in the form of 17β-estradiol but at much lower levels than testosterone.

Type I males also have five times more 11-ketotestoterone, which is a form of testosterone common to teleosts, than type II males and females. 11-ketotestosterone is likely to be more potent than testosterone in supporting courtship behaviors such as humming.
