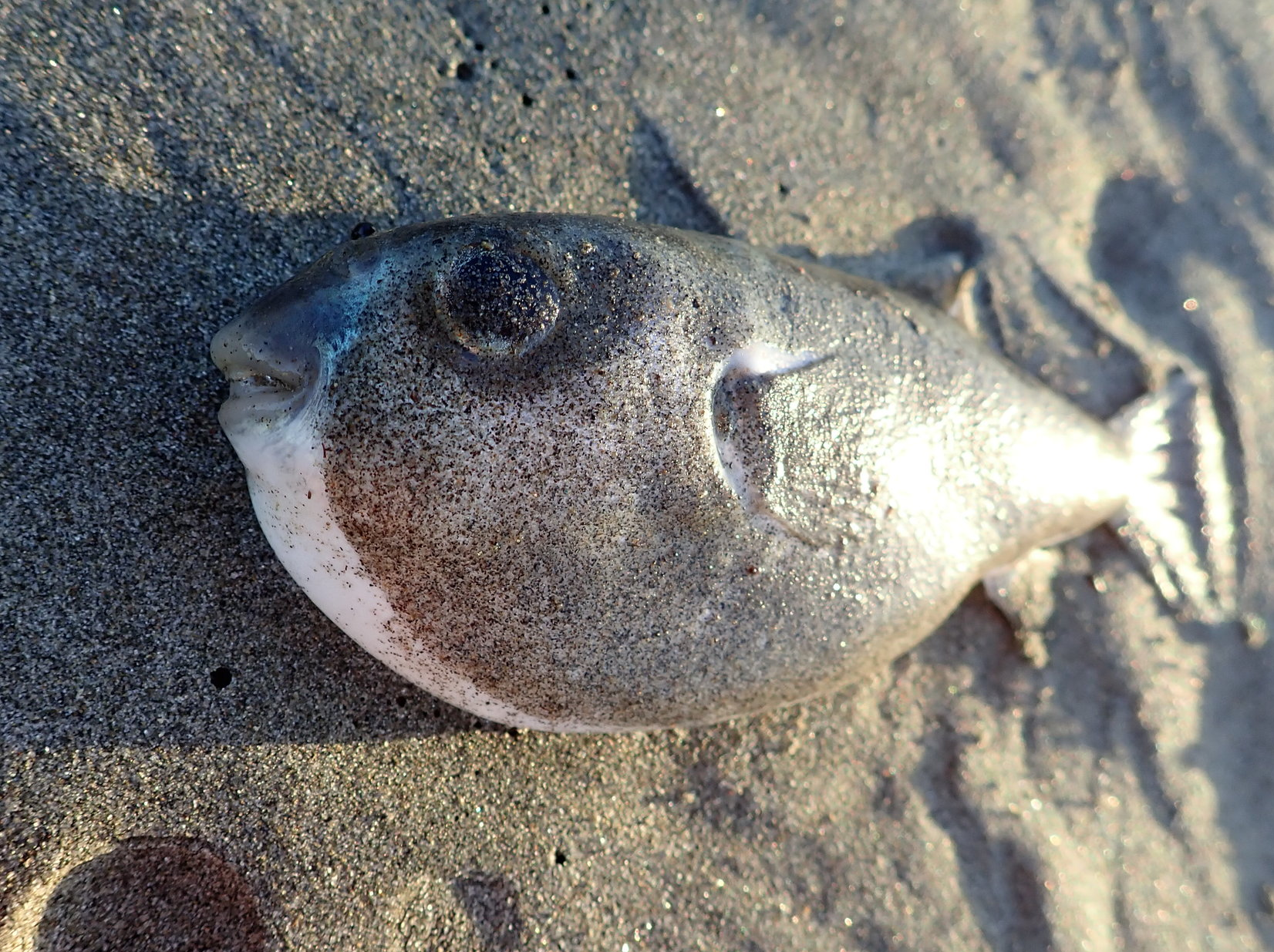

Conservation status
- Least Concern (IUCN 3.1)

Scientific classification
- Kingdom: Animalia
- Phylum: Chordata
- Class: Actinopterygii
- Order: Tetraodontiformes
- Family: Tetraodontidae
- Genus: Contusus
- Species: C. richei

Binomial name
- Contusus richei (Fréminville, 1813)

= Contusus richei =

Species of fish

Contusus richei is a pufferfish of the family Tetraodontidae, found in the eastern Indian Ocean and the southwest Pacific Ocean, at depths down to 50 m. It is commonly known as the prickly toadfish, a name it shares with C. brevicaudus. Its length is up to 25 cm.
