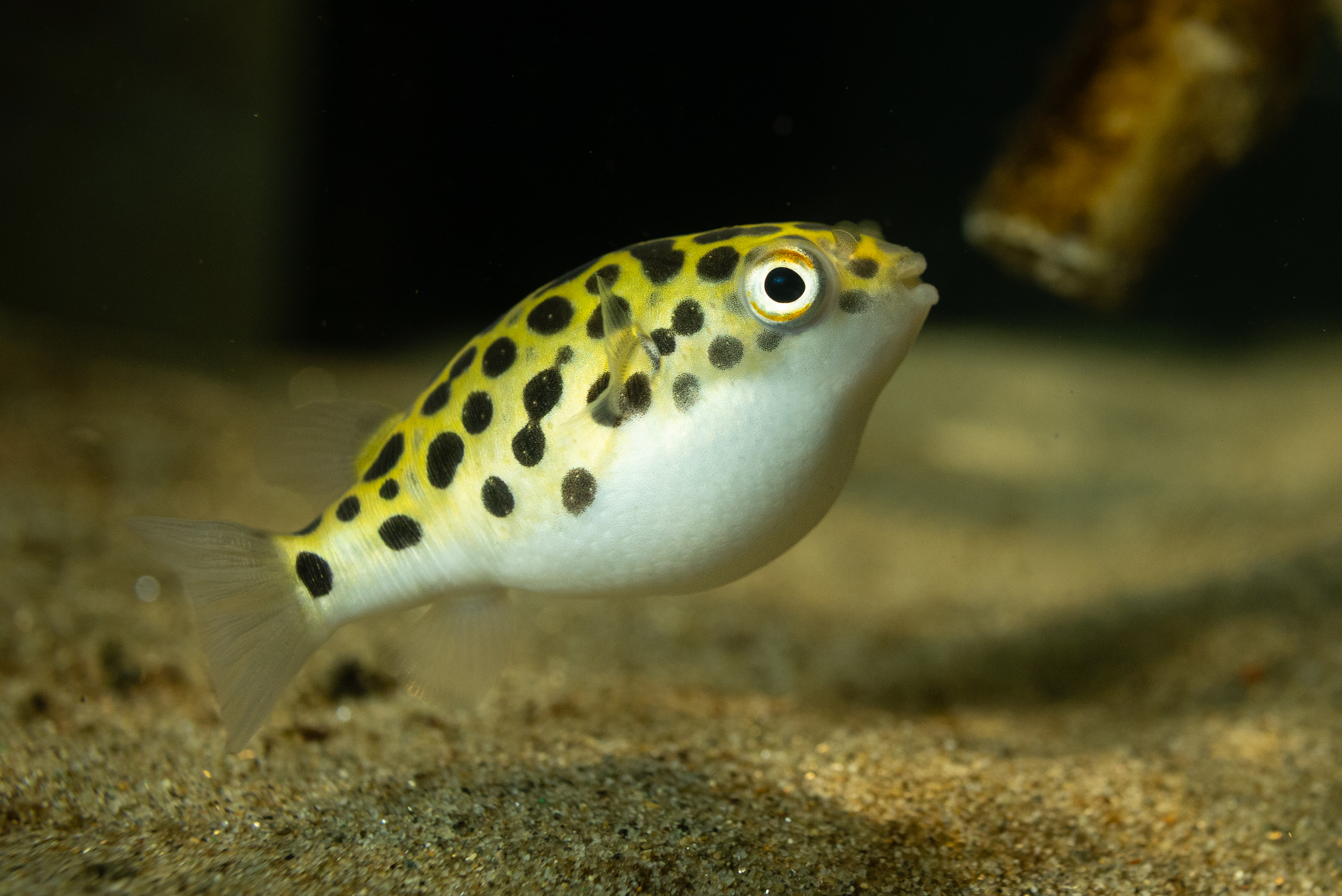

Conservation status
- Least Concern (IUCN 3.1)

Scientific classification
- Kingdom: Animalia
- Phylum: Chordata
- Class: Actinopterygii
- Division: Teleostei
- Order: Tetraodontiformes
- Family: Tetraodontidae
- Genus: Dichotomyctere
- Species: D. nigroviridis

Binomial name
- Dichotomyctere nigroviridis (Marion de Procé, 1822)

Synonyms
- Tetraodon nigroviridis

= Dichotomyctere nigroviridis =

Species of fish

Dichotomyctere nigroviridis (syn. Tetraodon nigroviridis) or the green spotted puffer is a species of pufferfish. It is found across South and Southeast Asia in coastal freshwater, but survives the longest in brackish to saltwater, and brackish water habitats. D. nigroviridis reaches a typical maximum length of about 15 cm (5.9 in), with reports of up to 17 cm (6.7 in). In February 2009, it was successfully bred in captivity at University of Florida using a new variation of the ovarian lavage technique.

== In the aquarium ==
Dichotomyctere nigroviridis is frequently raised in aquariums. However, the species' aggressive nature limits its ability to be housed with other fish. In captivity, specimens can grow up to 10 cm in length. The species is an omnivorous brackish water species and is most commonly raised in water with a pH level of 8. This species begins life in brackish water and progresses to high brackish (S.G. 1.015) as it becomes an adult.

== Ecology ==
Adults of D. nigroviridis are found in freshwater streams, rivers, and flood plains; young are found in brackish water. They are also found in mangrove forests. Their diet consists primarily of snails, but includes mollusks, crustaceans, and some plant material. This species may also be lepidophagous. Its flesh contains a virulent toxin, and should not be eaten.

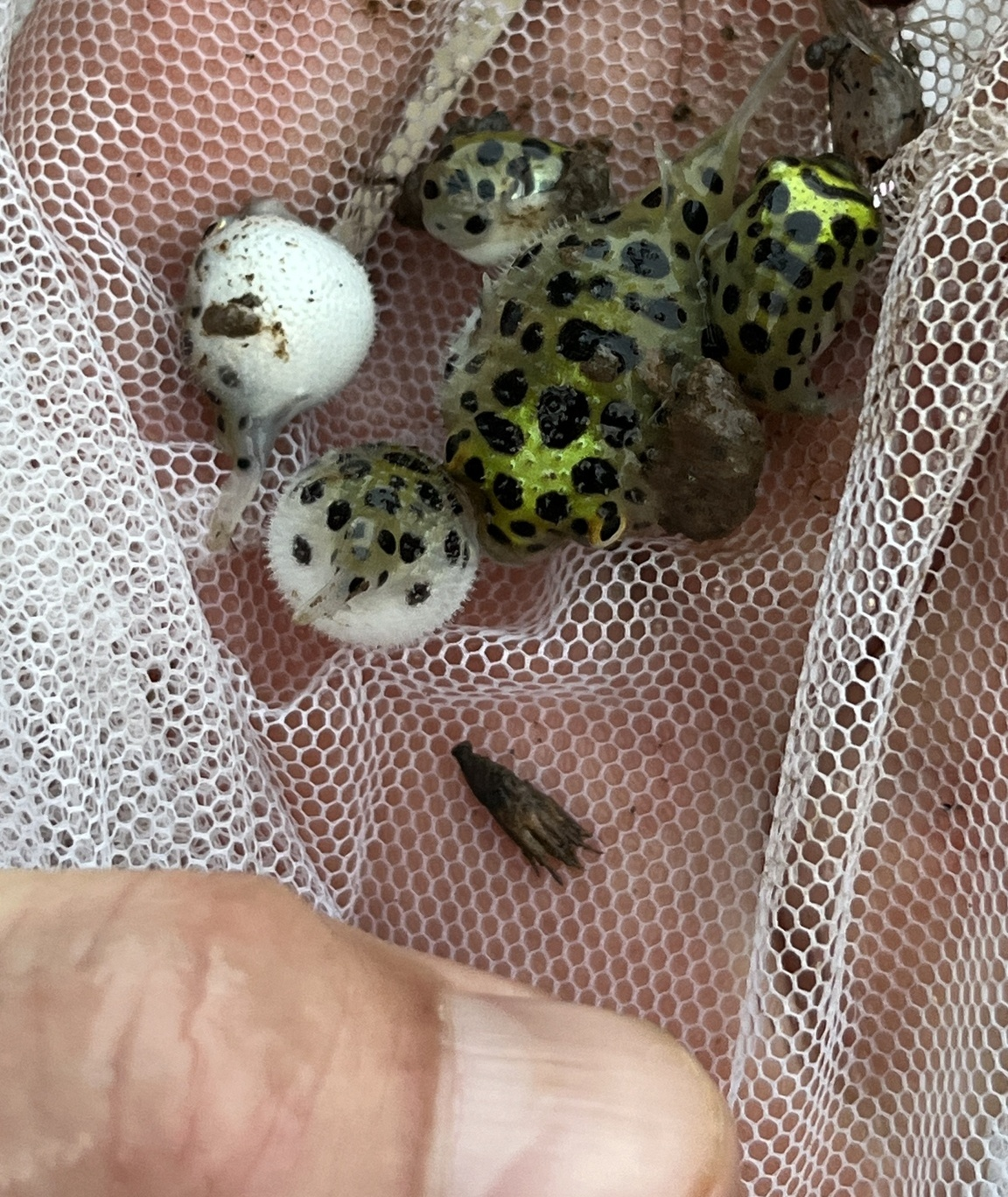
Puffed up young puffers

== Genetics ==
D. nigroviridis has the smallest known vertebrate genome, roughly 340 million base pairs, and has thus been selected as a model organism for genetics. In 2004, a draft of its genome sequence was published.

== Colour ==
D. nigroviridis is green on the body with black spots. Its belly is white and its fins and tail are light green.

== Commercial importance ==
D. nigroviridis is by no means a food fish, but has some value as bait and is very widely traded as an aquarium fish, and is sometimes mistaken as Dichotomyctere fluviatilis. D. nigroviridis also has some value as a lab animal, in particular in genetics, because it has the same number of genes as human beings, but in a genome about one-tenth the size.
