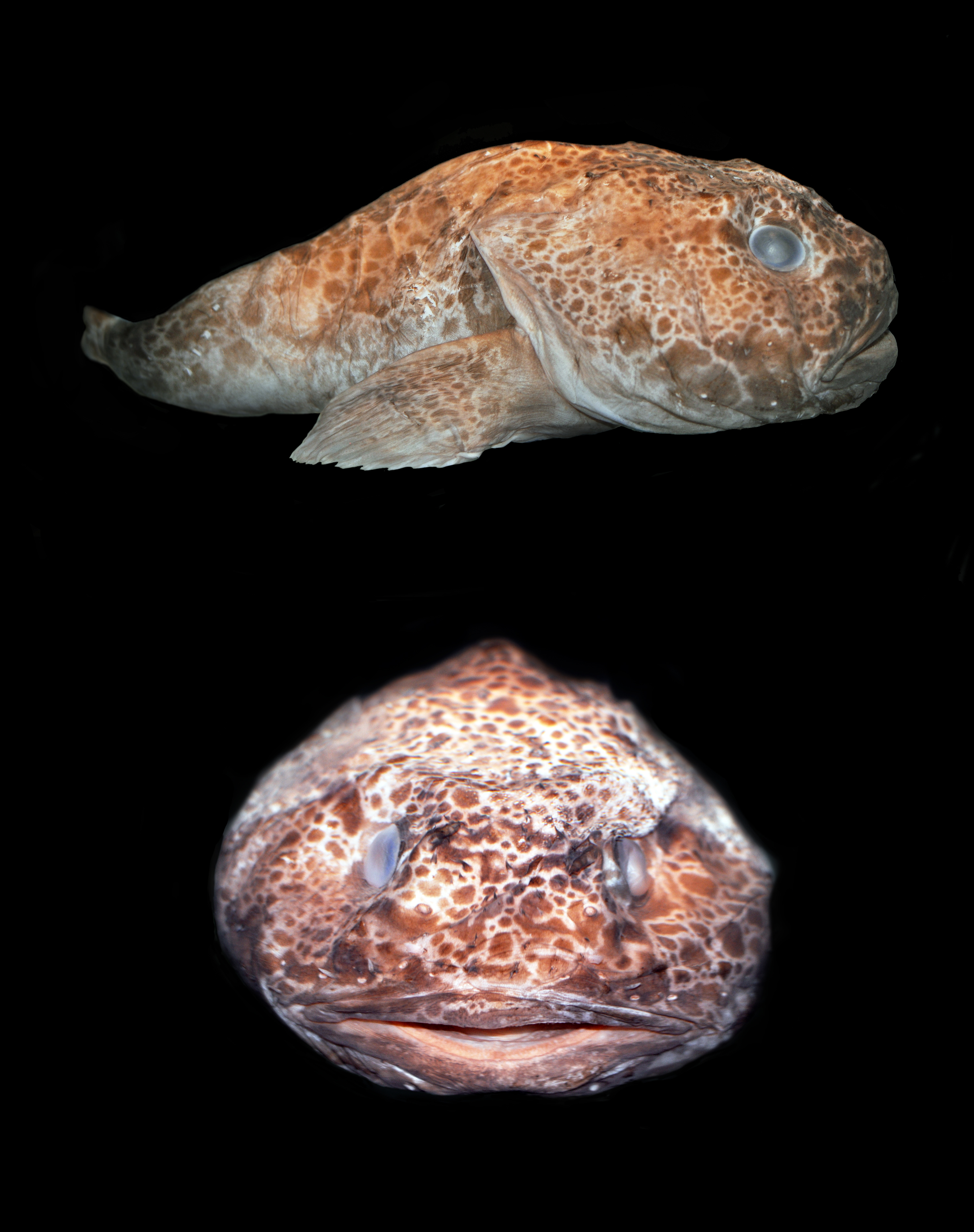

Scientific classification
- Kingdom: Animalia
- Phylum: Chordata
- Class: Actinopterygii
- Order: Perciformes
- Suborder: Cottoidei
- Family: Psychrolutidae
- Genus: Ambophthalmos
- Species: A. angustus

Binomial name
- Ambophthalmos angustus (J. S. Nelson, 1977)

Synonyms
- Neophrynichthys angustus J. S. Nelson, 1977

= Pale toadfish =

Species of fish

The pale toadfish (Ambophthalmos angustus, previously classified as Neophrynichthys angustus) is a fathead sculpin of the family Psychrolutidae.

== Habitat and appearance ==
The fathead sculpin is found on the continental shelf around New Zealand, between 250 and 1,000 metres deep. It is up to 30 cm long.
