= Prickly toadfish =

Prickly toadfish is a common name for several species of pufferfish and may refer to:

- Contusus richei, a species of pufferfish found in the eastern Indian Ocean and the southwest Pacific Ocean
- Contusus brevicaudus, a species of pufferfish found only in Australia
