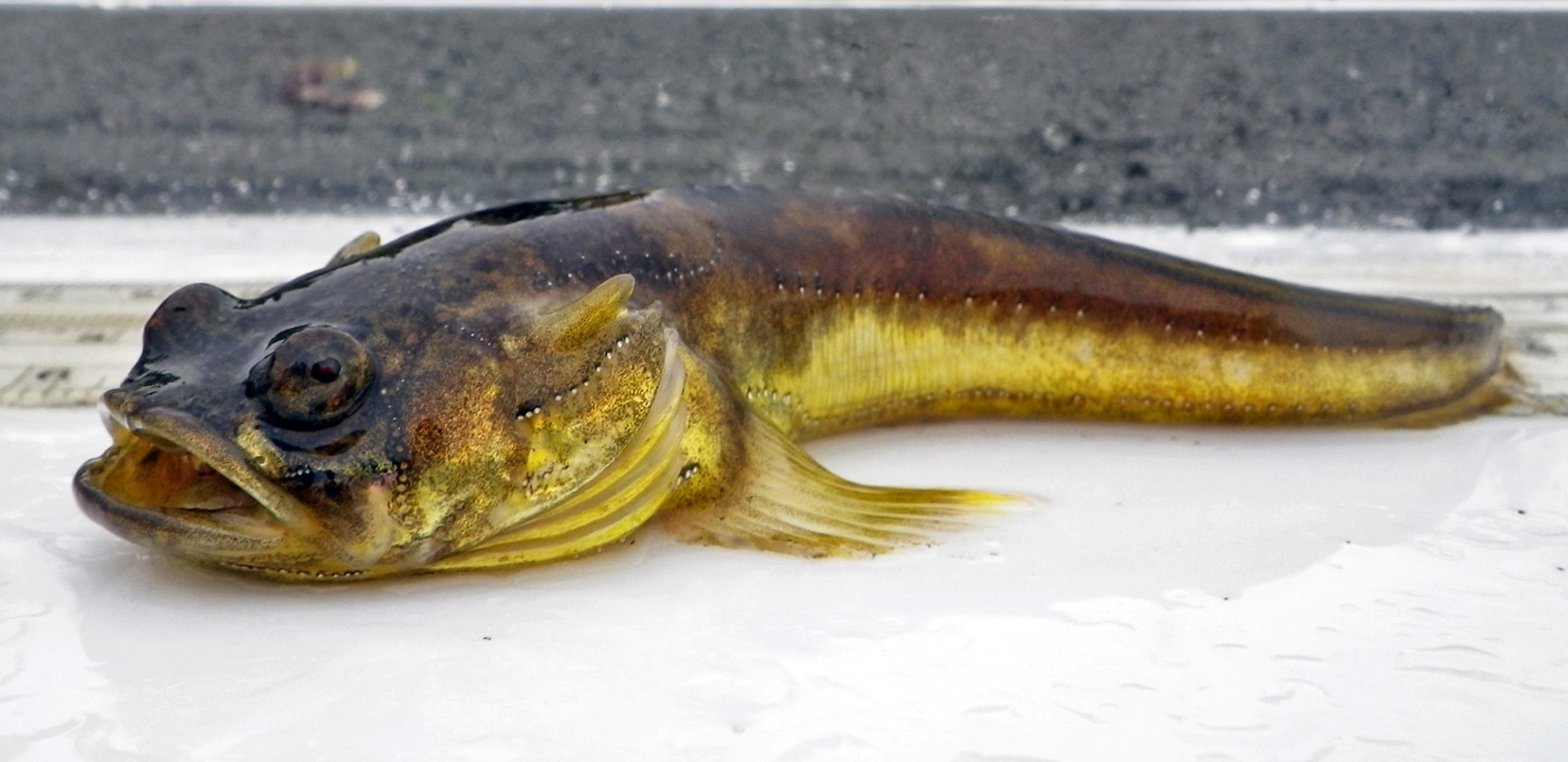
- Plainfin midshipman (Porichthys notatus)

Scientific classification
- Kingdom: Animalia
- Phylum: Chordata
- Class: Actinopterygii
- Order: Batrachoidiformes
- Family: Batrachoididae
- Subfamily: Porichthyinae
- Genus: Porichthys; Girard 1854

Type species
- Porichthys notatus Girard 1854

Species
- See text

= Midshipman fish =

Midshipman fish Temporal range: Late Miocene-Present ~11.6–0 Ma

Genus of fishes

A midshipman fish is any species of toadfish belonging to the genus Porichthys (in family Batrachoididae). Historically, there have been two common names. Porichthys refers to the well developed pores on the fish, and this led to the common name "Porous Catfish". The other common name, "Midshipman" is based on the pattern of button-like luminous spots (photophores) which resemble the buttons on the uniforms of young naval officers known as midshipmen.

Midshipman fish are distinguished by their photophores and four lateral lines. Typical midshipman fishes, such as the plainfin midshipman (Porichthys notatus), are nocturnal and bury themselves in sand or mud in the intertidal zone during the day, to float just above the seabed at night. Some species have venomous dorsal spines and are capable of inflicting serious injuries if handled.

== Description ==
Male midshipman fish have two morphs: type I and type II. Type I and type II males have different reproductive strategies, and can be distinguished from each other based on physical characteristics. Type I males are eight times larger in body mass, and have much larger vocal organs. Type II males’ reproductive organs are seven times larger in size than those of type I males. Female and type II male midshipman fish can be distinguished from each other by the female's slightly larger size, and the type II male midshipman's large reproductive organs.

== Species ==
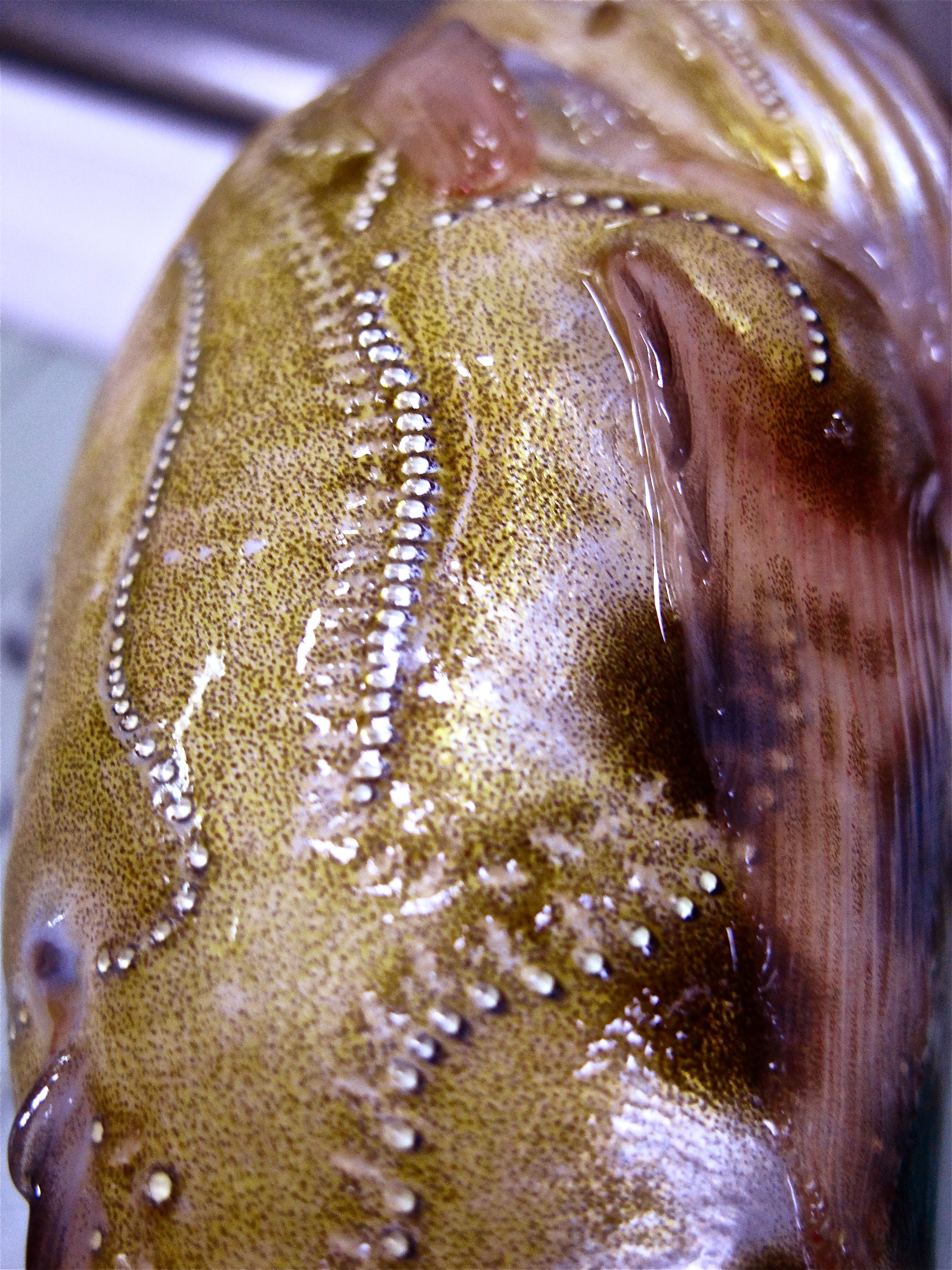
Photophores on an Atlantic midshipman. Midshipman fish are named after their photophores.

=== Extant species ===
There are currently 14 recognized extant species in this genus:

- Porichthys analis C. L. Hubbs & L. P. Schultz, 1939 (Darkedge midshipman)
- Porichthys bathoiketes C. R. Gilbert, 1968
- Porichthys ephippiatus H. J. Walker & Rosenblatt, 1988 (Saddle midshipman)
- Porichthys greenei C. H. Gilbert & Starks, 1904 (Greene's midshipman)
- Porichthys kymosemeum C. R. Gilbert, 1968
- Porichthys margaritatus (J. Richardson, 1844) (Daisy midshipman)
- Porichthys mimeticus H. J. Walker & Rosenblatt, 1988 (Mimetic midshipman)
- Porichthys myriaster C. L. Hubbs & L. P. Schultz, 1939 (Specklefin midshipman)
- Porichthys notatus Girard, 1854 (Plainfin midshipman)
- Porichthys oculellus H. J. Walker & Rosenblatt, 1988 (Smalleye midshipman)
- Porichthys oculofrenum C. R. Gilbert, 1968
- Porichthys pauciradiatus D. K. Caldwell & M. C. Caldwell, 1963
- Porichthys plectrodon D. S. Jordan & C. H. Gilbert, 1882 (Atlantic midshipman)
- Porichthys porosissimus (G. Cuvier, 1829)

=== Fossil species ===
- †Porichthys analis - Early Pliocene Onzole Formation, Ecuador
- †Porichthys margaritatus - idem
- †Porichthys pedemontanus Robba 1970 - Tortonian Italy

== Biology ==
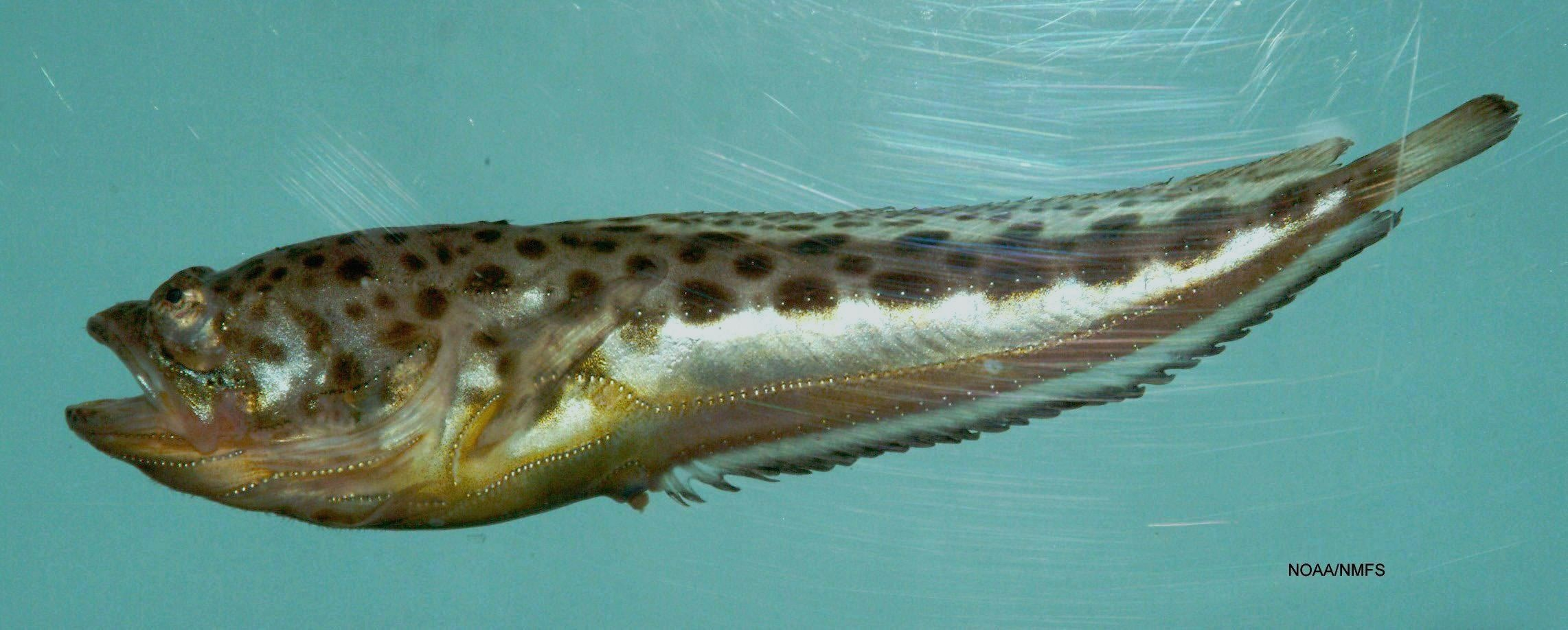
Atlantic midshipman (Porichthys plectrodon)

=== Reproduction and vocalization ===
Mating in midshipman fishes depends on auditory communication. Male midshipman fish produce several different vocalizations while females only make grunts in non-breeding situations.
