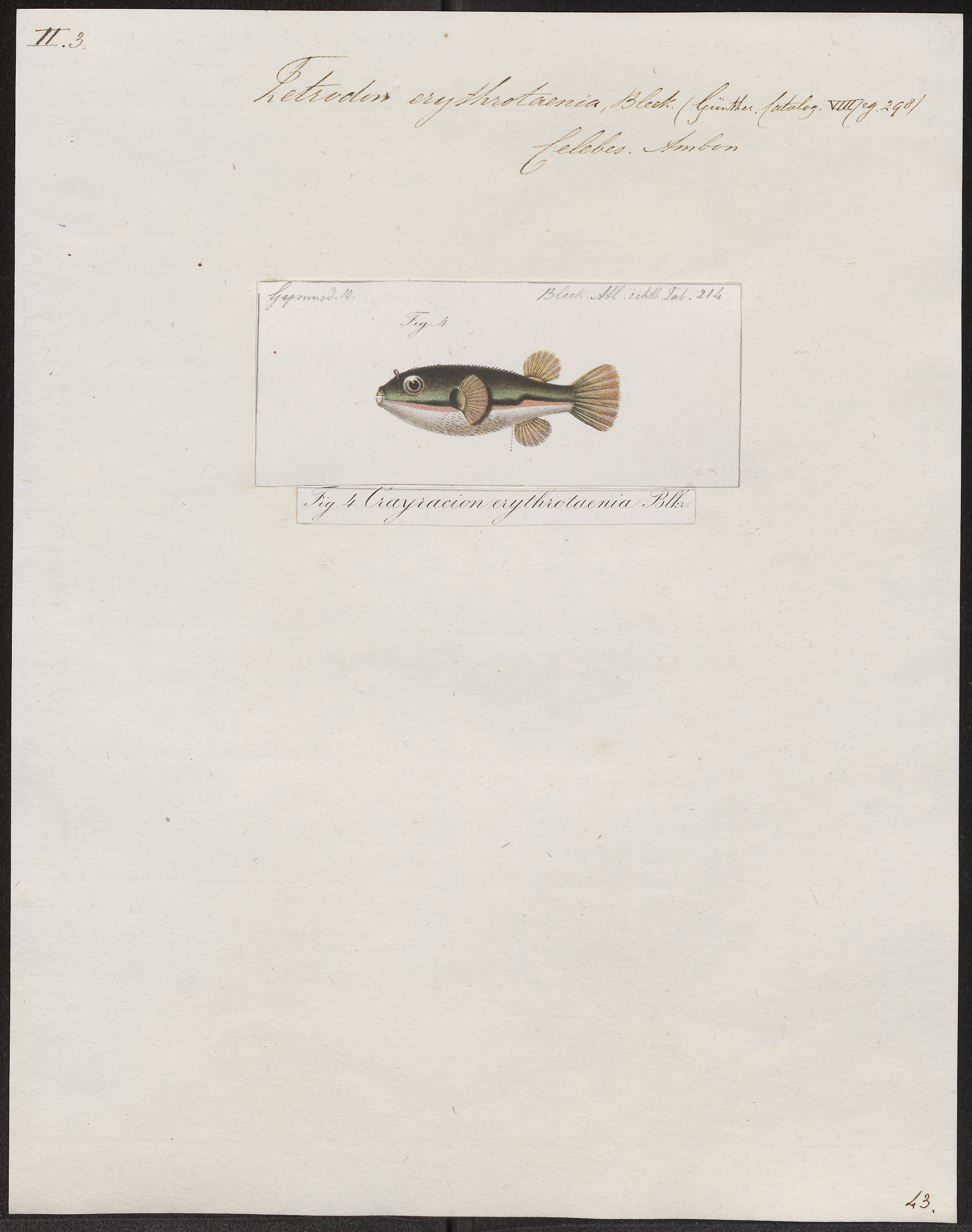

Scientific classification
- Kingdom: Animalia
- Phylum: Chordata
- Class: Actinopterygii
- Order: Tetraodontiformes
- Family: Tetraodontidae
- Genus: Dichotomyctere
- Species: D. erythrotaenia

Binomial name
- Dichotomyctere erythrotaenia Bleeker, 1853
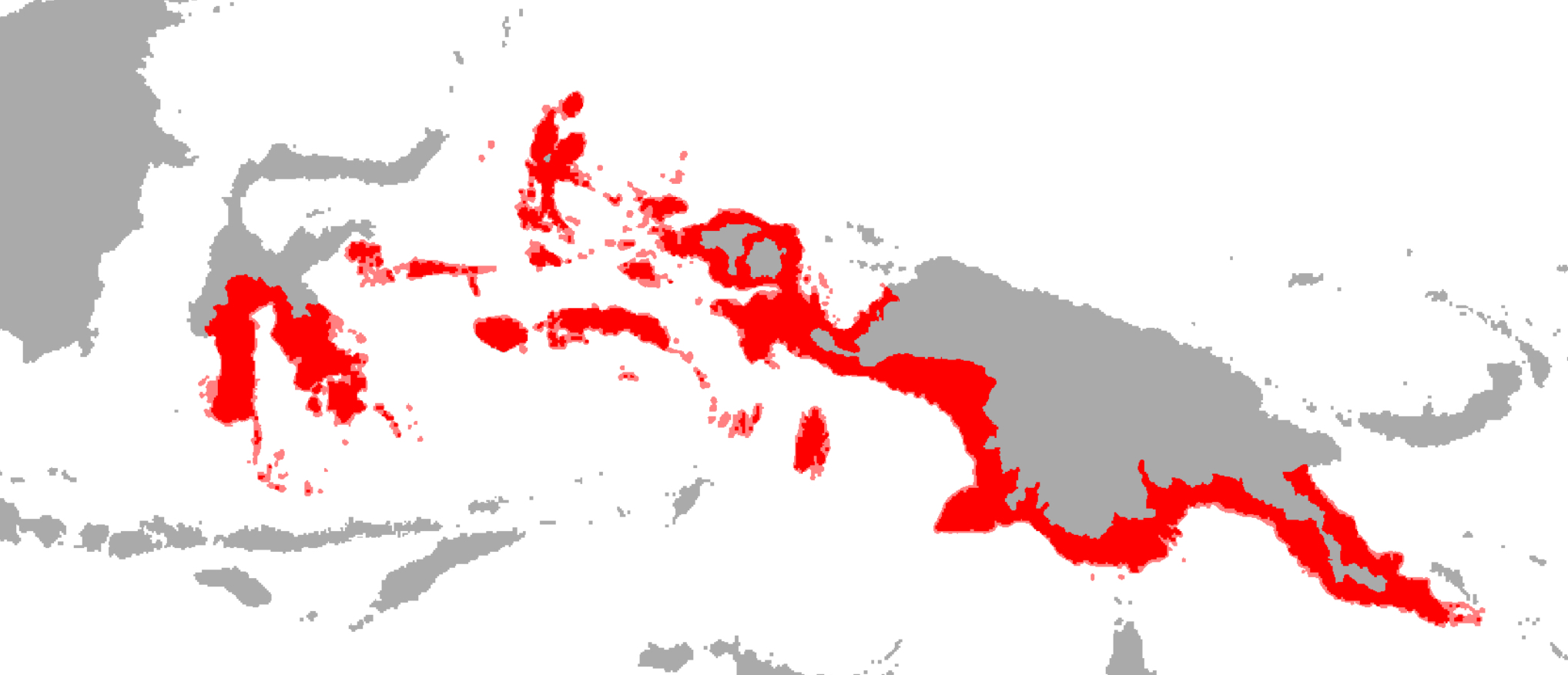

Synonyms
- Tetraodon erythrotaenia

= Dichotomyctere erythrotaenia =

Species of fish

Dichotomyctere erythrotaenia, or the red-striped toadfish, is a species of pufferfish native to Indonesia and Papua New Guinea where it is found most often in brackish water environments. This species grows to a length of 8.5 centimetres (3.3 in) TL.
