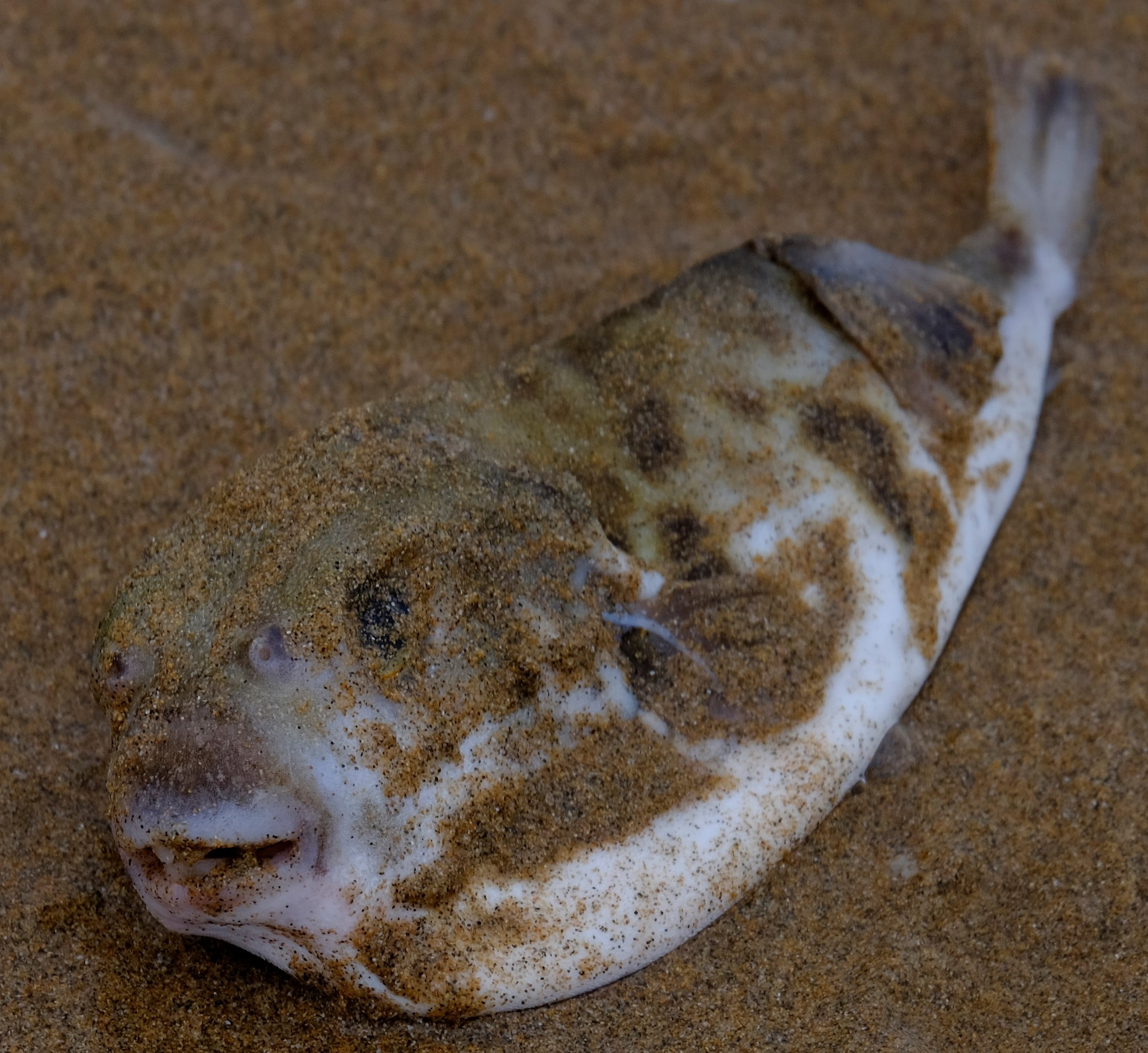

Scientific classification
- Kingdom: Animalia
- Phylum: Chordata
- Class: Actinopterygii
- Order: Tetraodontiformes
- Family: Tetraodontidae
- Genus: Contusus
- Species: C. brevicaudus

Binomial name
- Contusus brevicaudus Hardy, 1981

= Contusus brevicaudus =

Species of fish

Contusus brevicaudus, known as the prickly toadfish (a name also used for the closely related species C. richei), is a species of pufferfish in the family Tetraodontidae. It is known only from Australia, ranging from Western Australia to New South Wales, including Tasmania. It is a nocturnal species that inhabits estuaries and marine waters and is usually seen at depths of less than 20 m (66 ft). It reaches 25 cm (9.8 inches) in total length.
