= Frilled toadfish =

Scientific classification
- Kingdom: Animalia
- Phylum: Chordata
- Class: Actinopterygii
- Order: Perciformes
- Suborder: Cottoidei
- Family: Psychrolutidae
- Genus: Ambophthalmos
- Species: A. magnicirrus

Binomial name
- Ambophthalmos magnicirrus (J. S. Nelson, 1977)

Synonyms
- Neophrynichthys magnicirrus J. S. Nelson, 1977

Species of fish

The frilled toadfish (Ambophthalmos magnicirrus, previously classified as Neophrynichthys magnicirrus) is a fathead sculpin of the family Psychrolutidae, found on the continental shelf around Australia's Macquarie Island.
