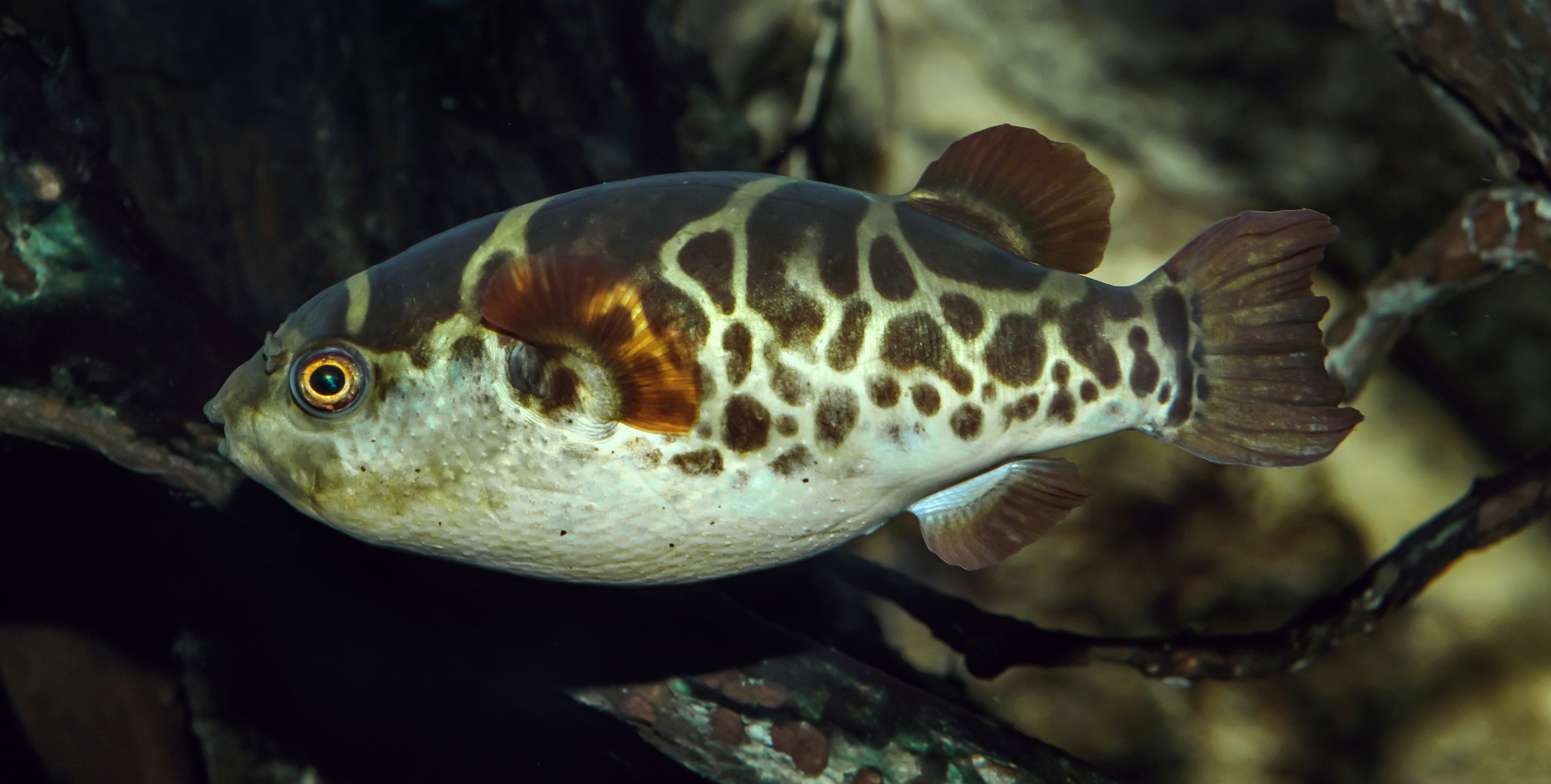

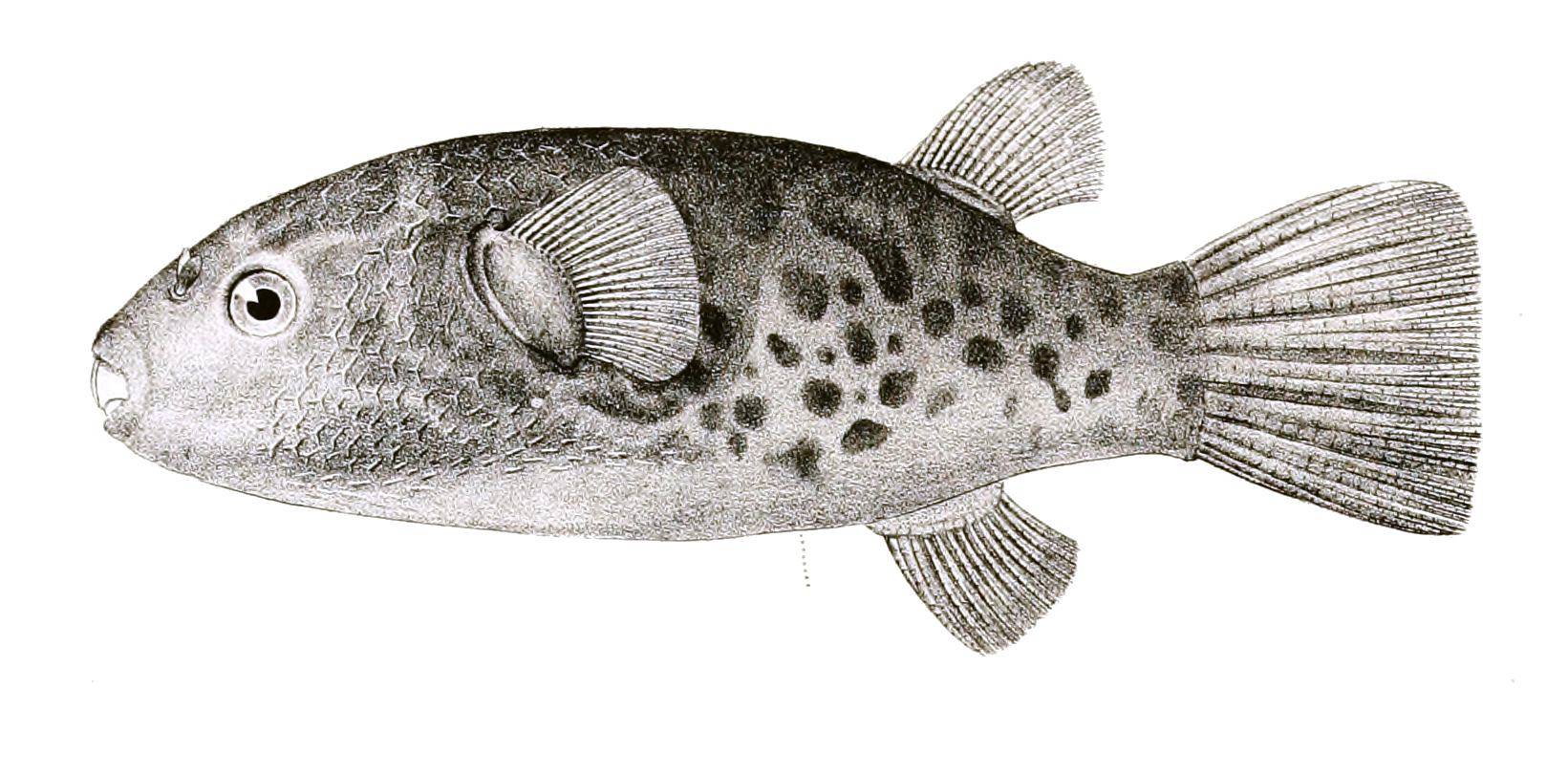

Conservation status
- Least Concern (IUCN 3.1)

Scientific classification
- Kingdom: Animalia
- Phylum: Chordata
- Class: Actinopterygii
- Order: Tetraodontiformes
- Family: Tetraodontidae
- Genus: Dichotomyctere
- Species: D. fluviatilis

Binomial name
- Dichotomyctere fluviatilis (Hamilton, 1822)
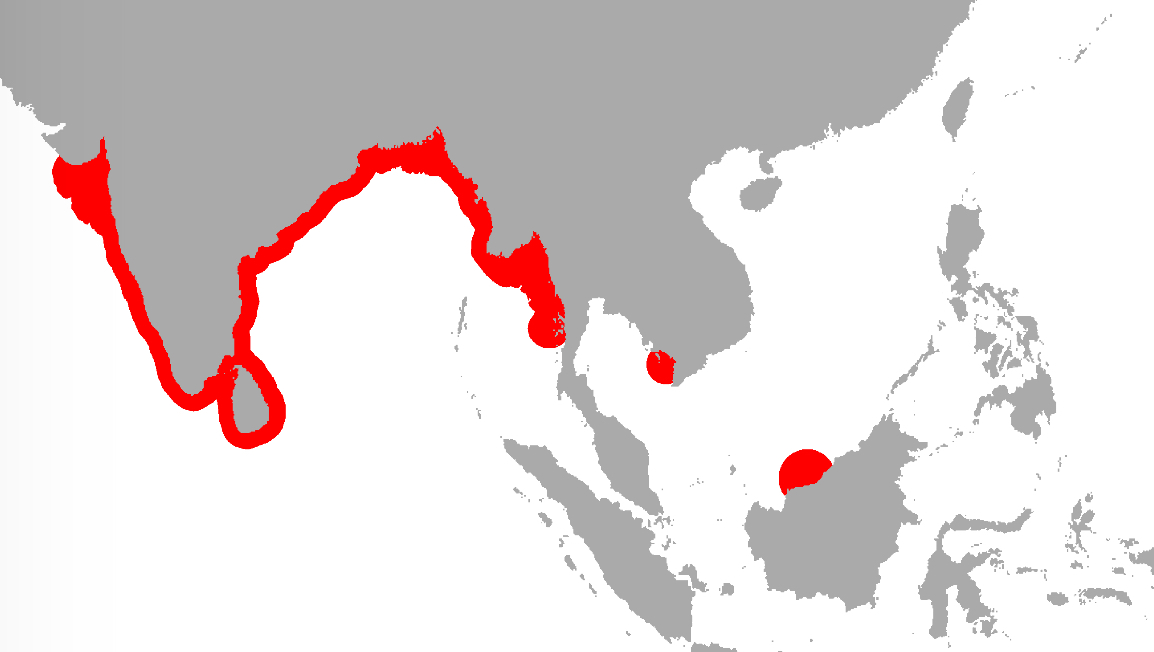

Synonyms
- Arothron dorsovittatus Blyth, 1860 Chelonodon fluviatilis (Hamilton, 1822) Dichotomycterus rangoonensis Le Danois, 1959; Tetraodon fluviatilis Hamilton, 1822

= Green pufferfish =

Species of fish

The green pufferfish or Ceylon pufferfish (Dichotomyctere fluviatilis) is a species of pufferfish found in South and Southeast Asia. Its habitat includes rivers, estuaries, lakes and flood plains, and it lives in fresh to slightly brackish water.

== Description ==
The green pufferfish grows up to 17 cm (6.7 in) TL, with a white underbelly and a metallic yellow or green top covered in black spots. Its bulging eyes are of a metallic blue color, and it has a very thick and broad forehead. Its body usually has a leathery texture, but green pufferfish grown in captivity tend to have smoother skin. Its flesh contains a virulent toxin, and it should not be eaten.

== Diet ==
The green pufferfish is primarily carnivorous, eating mollusks, crustaceans (the shells of which this species can crush with its beak) and invertebrates. Occasionally, algae and plant matter, as well as fish scales and other detritus, is consumed. In captivity, it will eat vegetation and commercial fish food.
