= Spotted unicornfish =

Spotted unicornfish is a common name for:

- Naso brevirostris
- Naso maculatus
