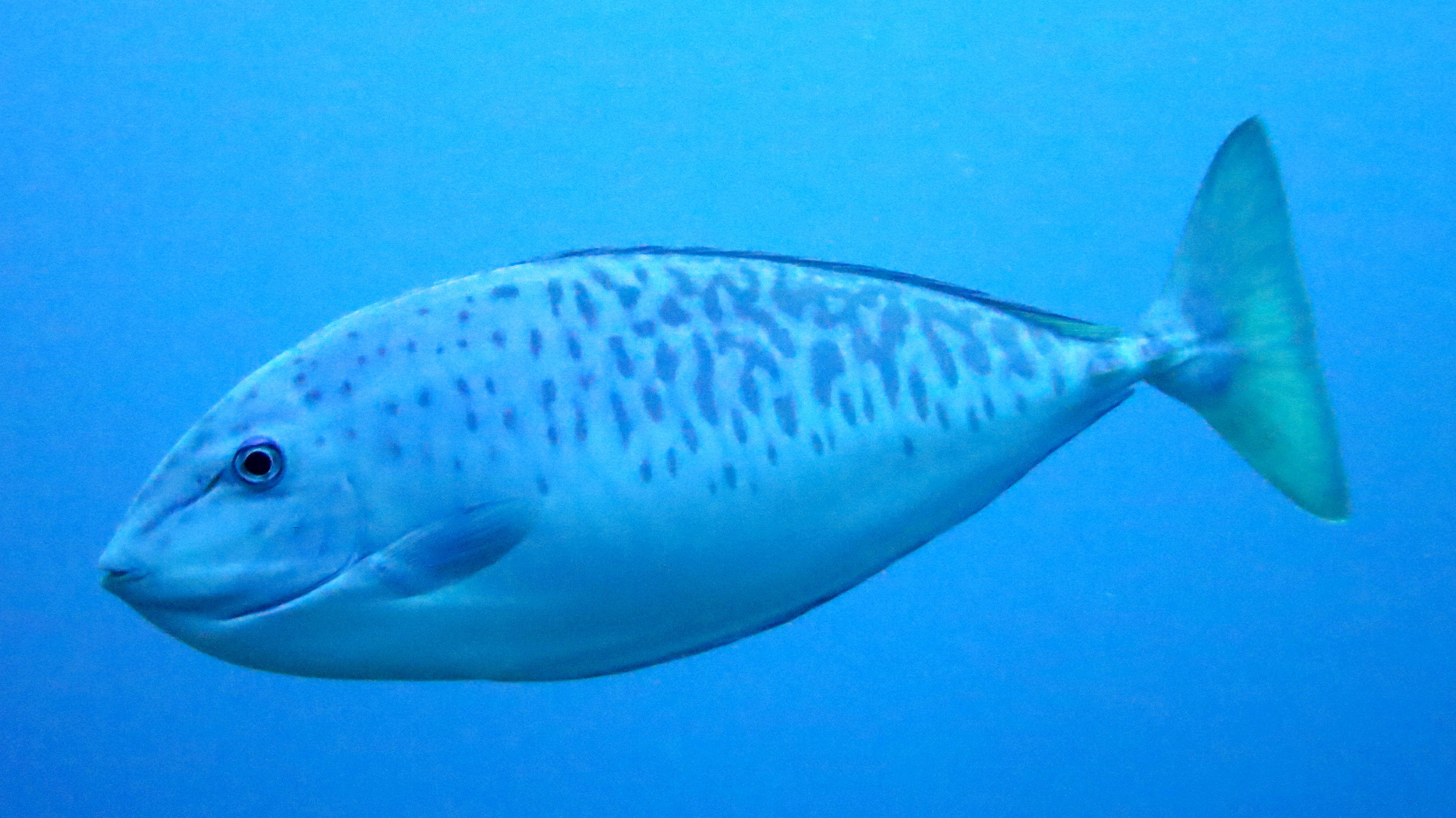

Conservation status
- Least Concern (IUCN 3.1)

Scientific classification
- Kingdom: Animalia
- Phylum: Chordata
- Class: Actinopterygii
- Order: Acanthuriformes
- Family: Acanthuridae
- Genus: Naso
- Subgenus: Naso
- Species: N. caesius

Binomial name
- Naso caesius J. E. Randall & Bell, 1992

= Naso caesius =

Species of fish

Naso caesius, the grey unicornfish or silverblotched unicornfish, is a species of marine ray-finned fish belonging to the family Acanthuridae, the surgeonfishes, unicornfishes and tangs. This species occurs in the Indo-Pacific region.

== Taxonomy ==
Naso caesius was first formally described in 1992 by the American ichthyologist John Ernest Randall and marine biologist Lori Jane Bell Colin with its type locality given as the northern side of the East Channel of Eniwetak Atoll in the Marshall Islands. This species is classified within the nominate subgenus of the genus Naso. The genus Naso is the only genus in the subfamily Nasinae in the family Acanthuridae.

== Etymology ==
Naso caesius has a specific name caesius which is Latin for "bluish grey", the overall colour of this fish.

== Description ==
Naso caesius has 6 or 7 spines and between 27 and 30 soft rays supporting the dorsal fin while the anal fin is supported by 2 spines and between 28 and 31 soft rays. The pectoral fin contains between 16 and 18 fin rays with upper two being simple, with no branches. The keels on the caudal peduncle are oval shaped with keels that are spines that project outwards but which are not acute. The overall colour is bluish-grey or greyish-brown and they can create a series of irregular blotches or bars along the flanks, these may be lighter or darker than the background colour. This fish has a maximum published standard length of 45.6 cm (18.0 in).

== Distribution and habitat ==
Naso caesius is found mainly in the western Central Pacific where it occurs in Palau, Mariana Islands, the northern Marshall Islands, Hawaiian Islands, Great Barrier Reef, Osprey Reef, and Chesterfield Islands, New Caledonia, Fiji, Tuvalu, Society Islands and Pitcairn Islands. In Australian waters away from the Great Barrier Reef this species is known from Lord Howe Island and the reefs in the Coral Sea as far south as the Kurnell Peninsula in New South Wales, as well as on reefs off Western Australia and at Ashmore Reef and the Indian Ocean islands of Christmas Island and the Cocos (Keeling) Islands. The grey unicornfish is a benthopelagic species found over rock and coral substrates where it occurs solitarily or in schools in clear waters in lagoon reefs, reef channels or seaward reefs at depths of between 15 and 50 m (49 and 164 ft) where they feed on zooplankton.
