= Naso tergus =

Scientific classification
- Kingdom: Animalia
- Phylum: Chordata
- Class: Actinopterygii
- Order: Acanthuriformes
- Family: Acanthuridae
- Genus: Naso
- Subgenus: Naso
- Species: N. tergus

Binomial name
- Naso tergus H. C. Ho, K. N. Shen & C. W. Chang, 2011

Species of fish

Naso tergus is a species of marine ray-finned fish belonging to the family Acanthuridae, the surgeonfishes, unicornfishes and tangs. This species was first formally described in 2011 from off of the coast of Taiwan after several specimens were collected.

== Taxonomy ==
Naso tergus was first formally described in 2011 by Ho-Hsuan Ching, Shen Kang-Ning and Chang Chi-Wei with its type locality given as off Nanfango in Ilan in nortrheastern Taiwan at a depth of 70 to 80 m (230 to 260 ft). This species is classified within the nominate subgenus of the genus Naso. The genus Naso is the only genus in the subfamily Nasinae in the family Acanthuridae.

== Etymology ==
Naso tergus was originally described as a cryptic species which hid among closely related fishes and bore a morphological resemblance to the subadults of those species. The authors chose the Latin word tergus as its specific name, this name means "hide". However, it means "hide" as a noun, i.e. the hide of an animal, rather than the verb which means to conceal.

== Description ==
Naso tergus has a moderately elongated and compressed body, described as having a slender body and head compared to its congeners. It has a relatively large head with a smoothly sloping dorsal profile with a relatively small mouth. The dorsal fin is supported by 6 spines and between 26 and 30 soft rays while the anal fin has 2 spines and 26 to 28 soft rays supporting it. There is a pair of elliptical bony plates on each side of the caudal peduncle. There are between 100 and 120 teeth on the lower jaw and between 90 and 110 on the upper jaw. The overall color of the body is brownish. This is a relatively small unicornfish with a standard length that may not exceed 35 cm (14 in).

== Distribution ==
Naso tergus has been recorded from Taiwan, southern Japan, and the Philippines as depths between 70 and 80 m (230 and 260 ft).
