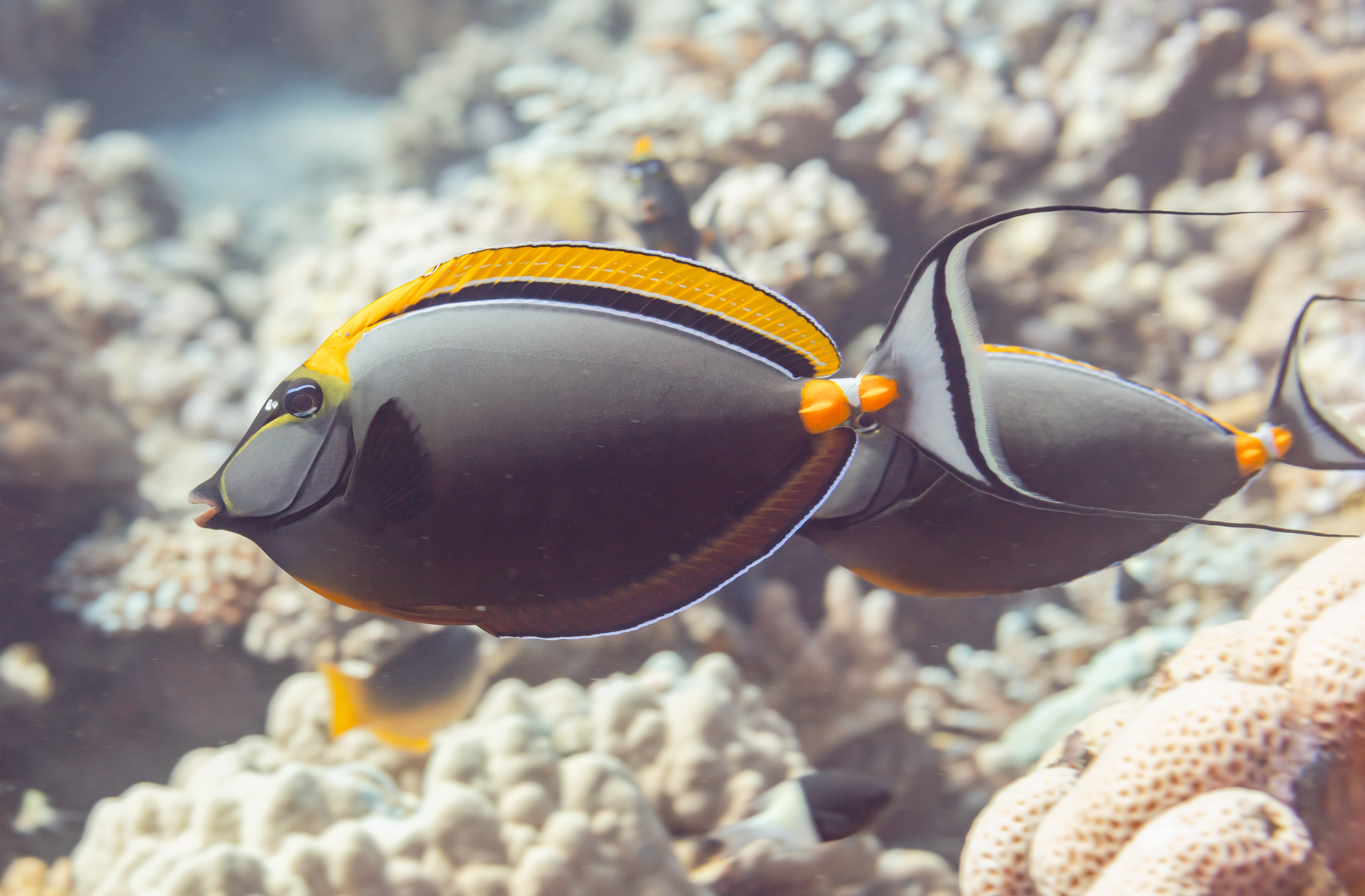
- In the Red Sea

Conservation status
- Least Concern (IUCN 3.1)

Scientific classification
- Kingdom: Animalia
- Phylum: Chordata
- Class: Actinopterygii
- Order: Acanthuriformes
- Family: Acanthuridae
- Genus: Naso
- Subgenus: Naso
- Species: N. elegans

Binomial name
- Naso elegans (Rüppell, 1829)

Synonyms
- Aspisurus elegans Rüppell, 1829

= Naso elegans =

Species of fish

Naso elegans, the elegant unicornfish, the blonde naso tang, Indian orange-spine unicorn, lipstick surgeonfish, lipstick tang, orangespine unicornfish or smoothheaded unicornfish, is a species of marine ray-finned fish belonging to the family Acanthuridae, the surgeonfishes, unicornfishes and tangs. This species is found in the Indian and western Pacific Oceans.

== Taxonomy ==
Naso elegans was first formally described as Aspisurus elegans in 1829 by the German zoologist and explorer Eduard Rüppell with its type locality given as the northern Red Sea. This species is classified within the nominate subgenus of the genus Naso. The genus Naso is the only genus in the subfamily Nasinae in the family Acanthuridae. For a long time this species was regarded as an Indian Ocean colour morph of the orangespine unicornfish (Naso lituratus) until it was shown that there were consistent meristic differences.

=== Etymology ===
The specific epithet elegans is Latin for "choice", "fine" or "select", a reference to the beautiful colours of this fish.

== Distribution and habitat ==
Naso elegans is found in the Indian and Pacific Oceans. It occurs in the Red Sea south along the east African coast to Durban in South Africa and eastward across the Indian Ocean into the Pacific where it reaches as far east as Bali in Indonesia. It is absent from the waters off the mainland Indian subcontinent. In Australian waters it has been recorded from Christmas Island and the Cocos (Keeling) Islands. The elegant unicornfish occurs in reef flats in coastal and inshore waters in small schools while in more oceanic waters it forms larger schools.

== Description ==
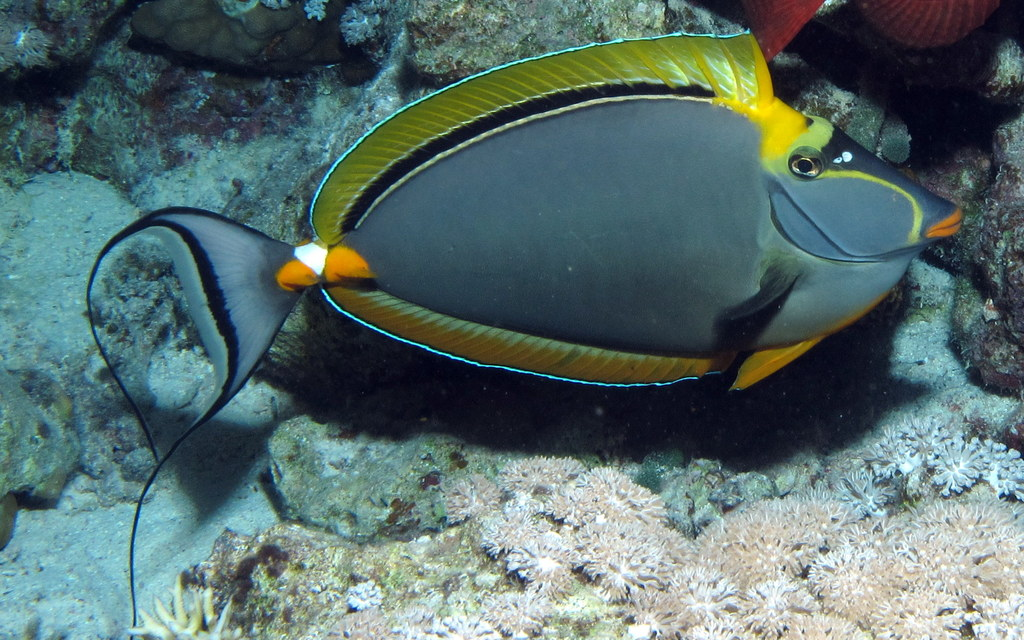
With fins extended, in the Red Sea

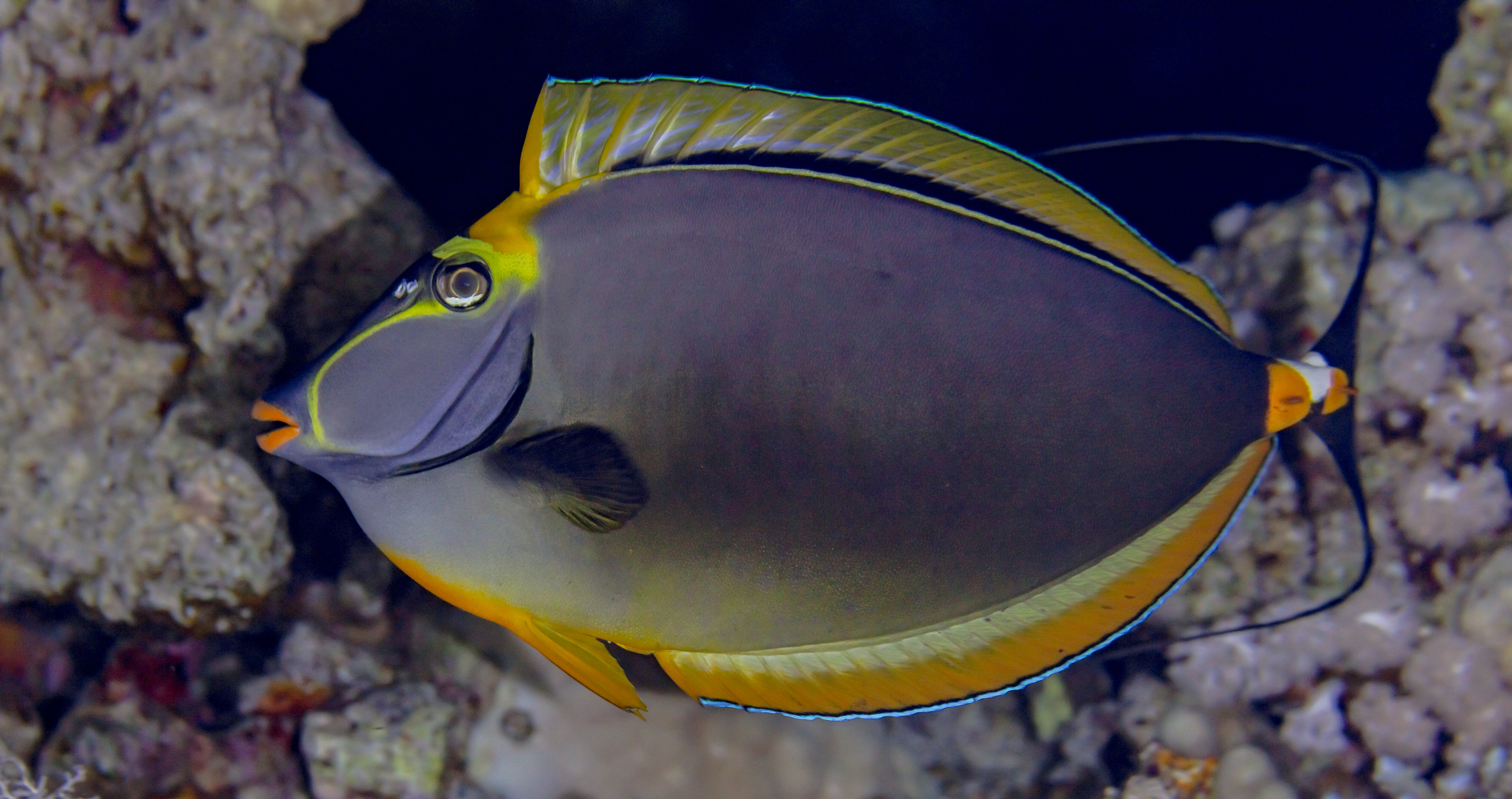
With fins extended, in the Red Sea

Naso elegans has 6 spines and between 26 and 30 soft rays, typically 28, supporting the dorsal fin while the anal fin is supported by 2 spines and between 27 and 30 soft rays, typically 29. The pectoral fin contains 16, or more usually, 17 fin rays. There are between 30 and 35 teeth in each jaw and, in adults, these are similar to incisors and have rounded edges. The body has a depth which is equivalent to roughly a quarter of the standard length and it grows more elongate as the fish grows.

The keels on the caudal peduncle are larger in males than in females and the males also have longer filaments growing from the caudal fin. The overall colour is grey, with a dark snout separated from the grey head by a yellow bar at the eyes. The dorsal fin is yellow with a thin blue edge and a black band inside that. The anal and pelvic fins are dark brown. The plates on the caudal peduncle are vivid orange separated by a patch of white. The caudal fin is yellowish with a black submarginal band and black lower and upper edges.

The elegant unicornfish has a maximum total length of 45 cm (18 in), although 35 cm (14 in) is more typical.

== Biology ==
Naso elegans is a herbivore, feeding on benthic algae, particularly brown algae in the genera Sargassum and Dictyota.

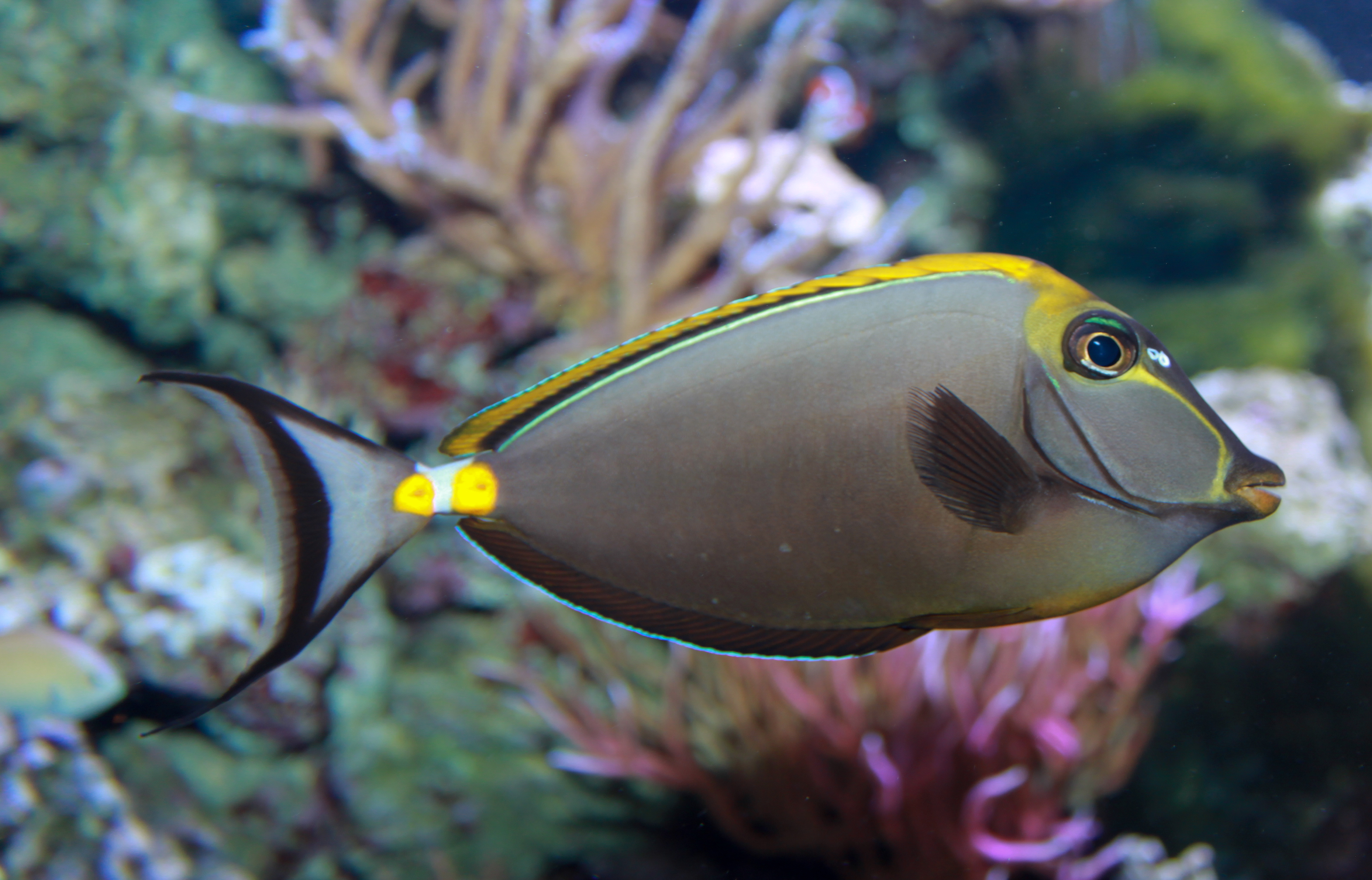

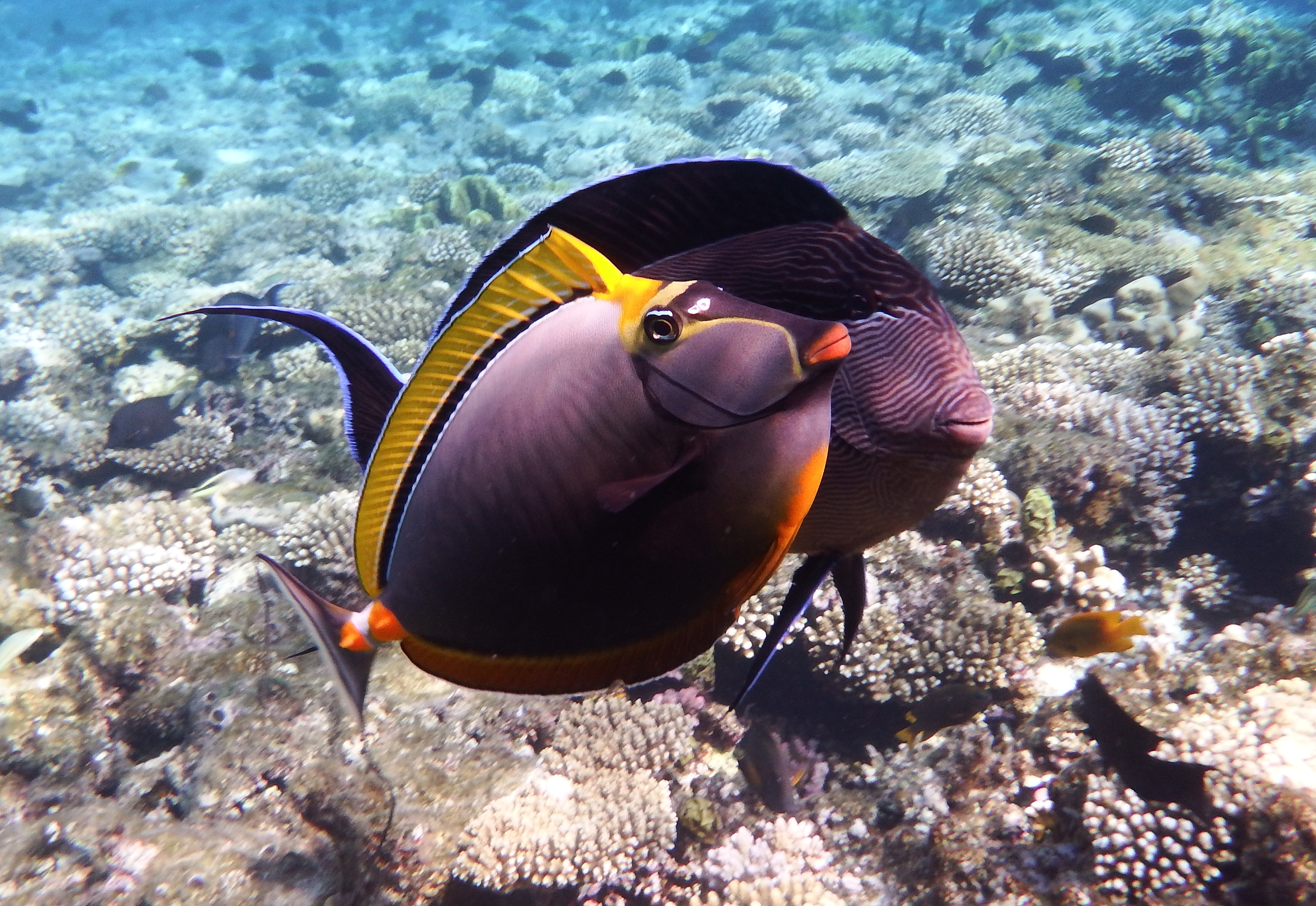
Fighting a sohal tang

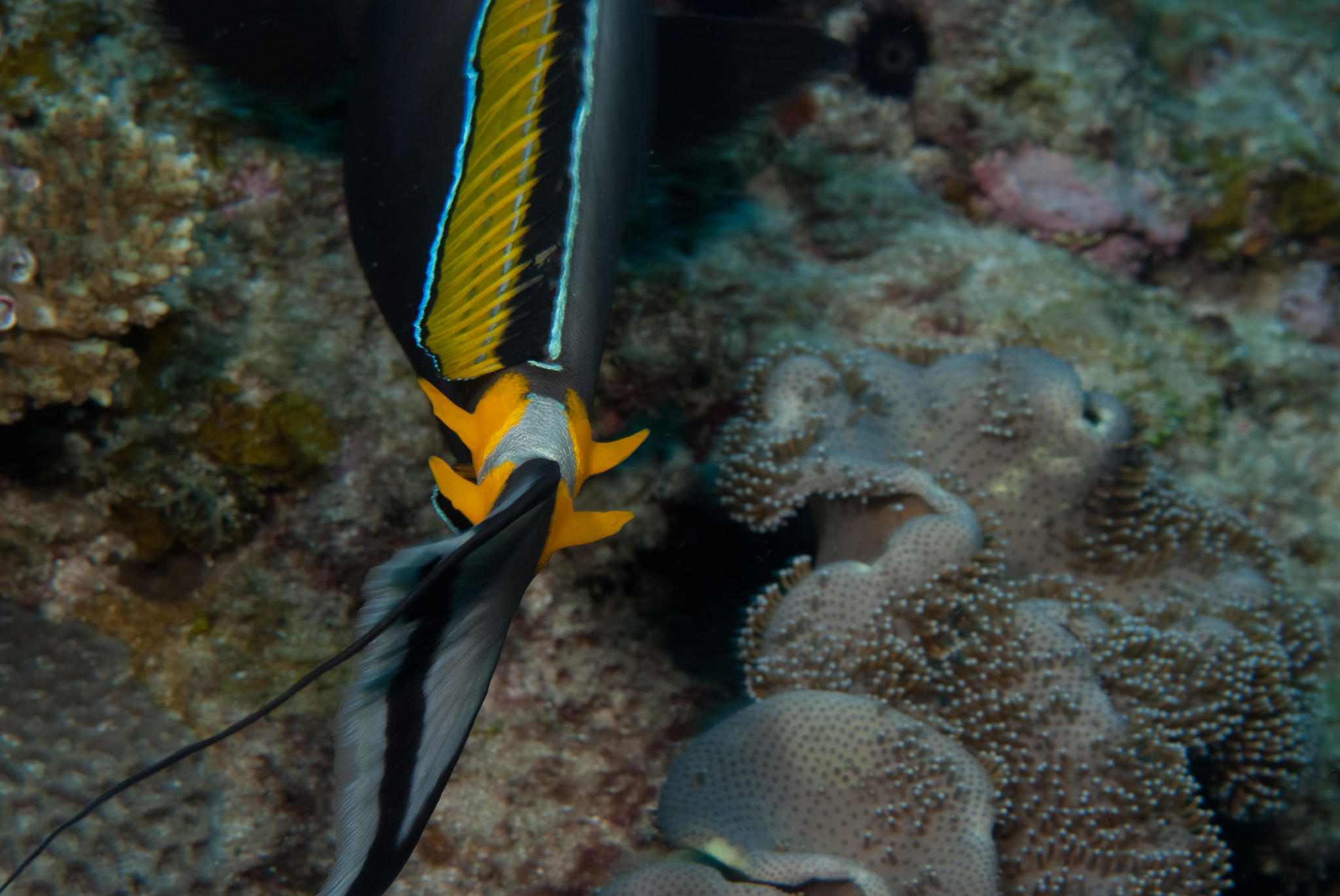
Showing tail spines
