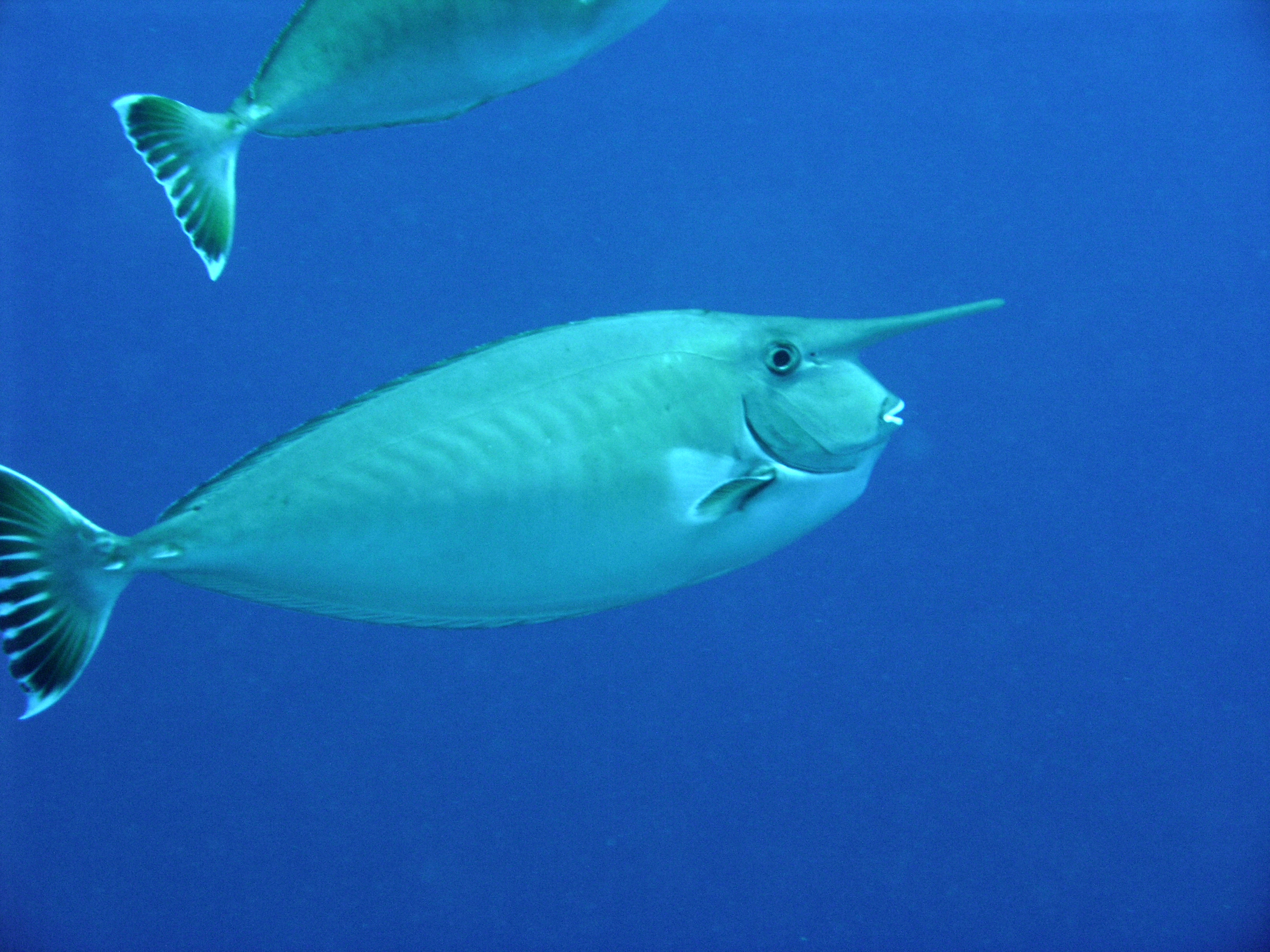

Conservation status
- Least Concern (IUCN 3.1)

Scientific classification
- Kingdom: Animalia
- Phylum: Chordata
- Class: Actinopterygii
- Division: Teleostei
- Order: Acanthuriformes
- Family: Acanthuridae
- Genus: Naso
- Subgenus: Naso
- Species: N. annulatus

Binomial name
- Naso annulatus (Quoy & Gaimard, 1825)

Synonyms
- Priodon annulatus Quoy & Gaimard, 1825; Naso herrei J. L. B. Smith, 1966; Acanthurus incipiens Jenkins, 1903; Naso marginatus Valenciennes, 1835

= Whitemargin unicornfish =

Species of fish

The whitemargin unicornfish (Naso annulatus), also known as the ringtailed unicornfish or short-horned unicorn-fish, is a tropical fish found throughout the Indo-Pacific. It can reach a length of 100 cm, making it one of the largest members of the family Acanthuridae.

== Taxonomy ==
The whitemargin unicornfish was first formally described in 1825 as Priodon annulatus by the French naturalists Jean René Constant Quoy and Joseph Paul Gaimard with its type locality given as Timor Island. It is classified within the nominate subgenus of the genus Naso. This genus is classified within the subfamily Nasinae of the family Acanthuridae.

== Description ==
The whitemargin unicornfish has its dorsal fin supported by 5 spines and 28 or 29 soft rays while the anal fin contains 2 spines and 27 or 28 soft rays. Their body has a standard length which is between 2.2 and 3 times its depth, deepest in adults. There is a long, horizontal, tapering bony protuberance in front of the eyes, this starts of as a bump in individuals with a total length of less than 20 cm (7.9 in). There is an angle of around 60° between the snout and the protuberance. The caudal peduncle has 2 bony plates on each side and, in adults, these develop blade-like keels. The caudal fin is truncate in juveniles but becomes scalloped in adults and the males develop long filaments from the tips of the lobes. The background colour of the body is bluish-grey or bluish-brown, paler on the lower body, and with no dark markings. They have white lips and in juveniles and subadults there is a clear white band on the caudal peduncle and a white edge to the caudal fin. As the grow into adults a black submarginal band develops in the caudal fin and they retain a thin white margin and tail filaments. With a maximum total length of 100 cm (39 in) this is the largest species in the genus Naso and one of the largest species of Acanthurid.

== Distribution and habitat ==
The white margin unicornfish has a wide distribution in the Indo-Pacific it occurs from the Red Sea and eastern coasts of Africa east as far as Cocos Island, part of Costa Rica. The juveniles occur in shallow, clear water on reefs in lagoons, as shallow as 1 m (3 ft 3 in), but adults are infrequently encountered at depths of less than 25 m (82 ft) off the outer drop-offs of reefs.

== Biology ==
The whitemargin unicornfish is found in small schools. The juveniles feed on filamentous green algae while the adults, with total lengths greater than 20 cm (7.9 in) change diet to feed on soft zooplankton such as ctenophores and jellyfish. Males and females form pairs to spawn.

== Utilisation ==
The white-margin unicornfish is collected for food and is sometimes taken into the aquarium trade.
