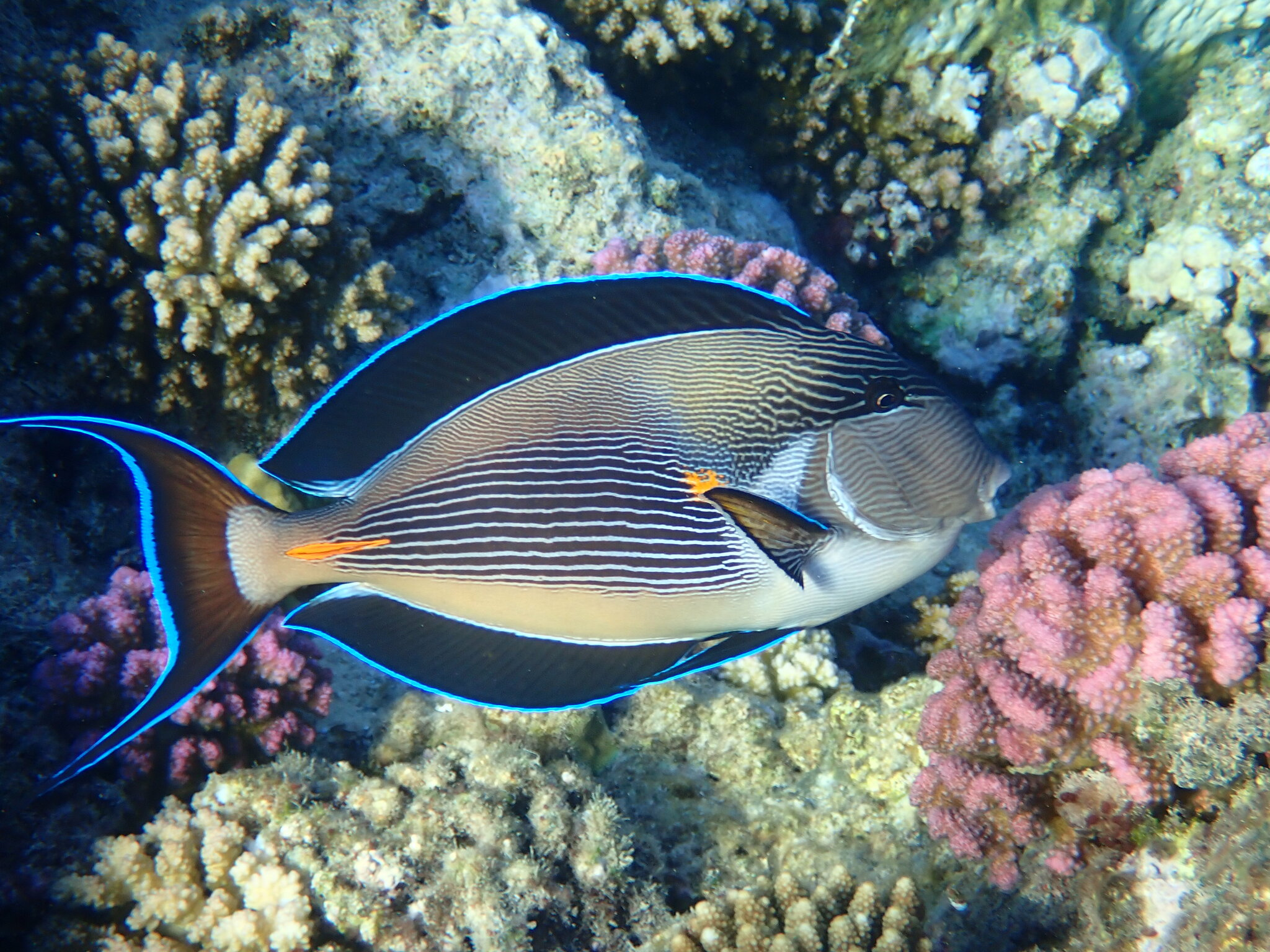
- In the Red Sea

Conservation status
- Least Concern (IUCN 3.1) (Global)

- Vulnerable (IUCN 3.1) (Persian Gulf)

Scientific classification
- Kingdom: Animalia
- Phylum: Chordata
- Class: Actinopterygii
- Division: Teleostei
- Order: Acanthuriformes
- Family: Acanthuridae
- Genus: Acanthurus
- Species: A. sohal

Binomial name
- Acanthurus sohal (Forsskål 1775)

Synonyms
- Chaetodon sohal Forsskål, 1775; Acanthurus carinatus Bloch & Schneider, 1801; Acanthurus ruppelii Swainson, 1839; Ctenodon ruppelii (Swainson, 1839)

= Sohal surgeonfish =

Species of fish

The sohal surgeonfish (Acanthurus sohal) or sohal tang, is a species of marine ray-finned fish belonging to the family Acanthuridae, which includes the surgeonfishes, unicornfishes, and tangs. This fish is found in the northwestern Indian Ocean.

== Taxonomy ==
The sohal surgeonfish was first formally described in 1775 as Chaetodon sohal by Swedish-speaking Finnish naturalist, explorer, and orientalist Peter Forsskål, with its type locality given as the Red Sea. Forsskål proposed Acanthuirus as a subgenus of Chaetodon, although he recognised that it was probably different from Chaetodon even at the family level. In 1856, Desmarest designated Teuthis hepatus, which had been described from a type now known to have been collected at Ambon Island in the Moluccas (other erroneous type localities were named) in 1758 by Linnaeus, as the type species of the genus. T. hepatus is a synonym of Paracanthurus hepatus, which would make Paracanthurus synonymous with Acanthurus. An alternative would be to use the name Harpurus proposed as a monospecific genus in 1788 by Johann Reinhold Forster when he described Harpurus fasciatus, a synonym of Acanthurus triostegus. It has been proposed that the International Commission on Zoological Nomenclature should be petitioned to stabilise the genera Acanthurus and Paracanthurus. In 2014, was proposed that the type species of Acanthurus should be C. sohal, which had also been described by Forsskål in 1775 as a member of the subgenus alongside C. bifasciatus, C. nigrofuscus, and C. unicornis, and had been designated as the type species by Jordan and Evermann in 1917.

== Etymology ==
The sohal surgeonfish's specific name, sohal, is the Arabic name for this species along the Red Sea coast.

== Description ==
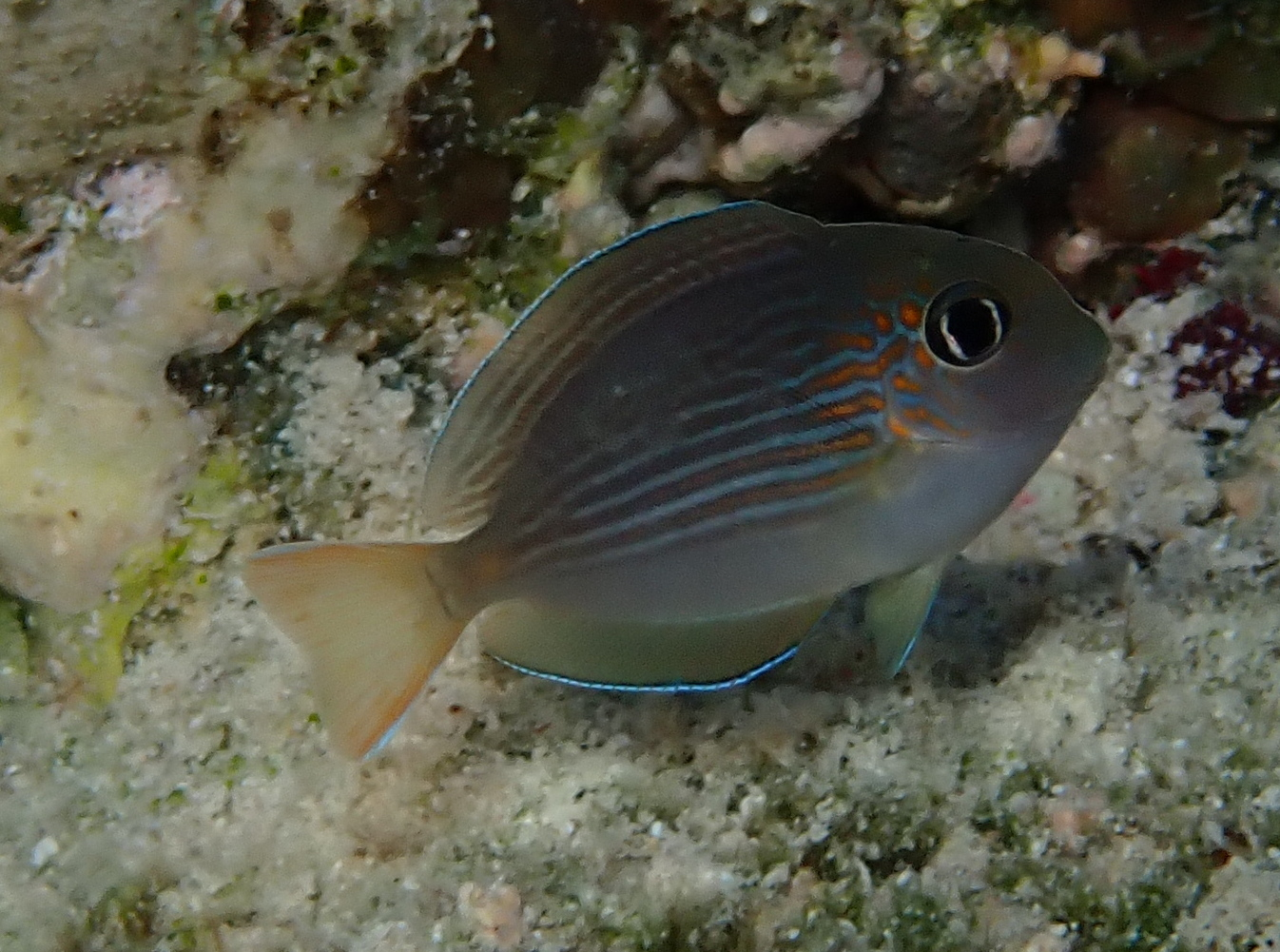
Juvenile

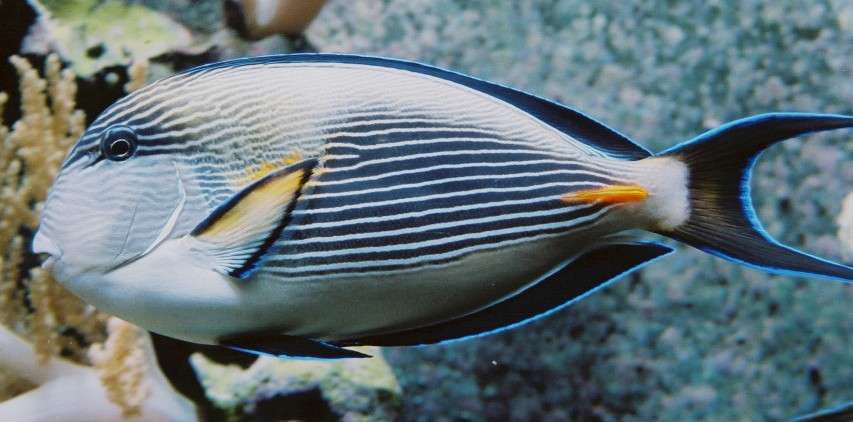
Adult

The sohal surgeonfish has its dorsal fin supported by 9 spines and 30 or 31 soft rays, while the anal fin is supported by three spines and 28 or typically 29 soft rays. The depth of the body is around half the standard length. This fish has longitudinal, thin, black stripes separated by greenish-olive stripes, and these join together at the spine on the caudal peduncle. The stripes are finer and more sinuous on the upper body, but broader and straighter on the lower body. The stripes are greyer on the upper head and nape. The lower head and ventral surface of the body are pale with faint grey and greenish-grey longitudinal lines; the dorsal, anal and pelvic fins are black with vivid blue margins, a large patch of orange is on the body underneath the pectoral fin and the sheath of the spine on the caudal peduncle is orange. The caudal fin is lunate. This species has a maximum published total length of 40 cm (16 in).

== Distribution and habitat ==
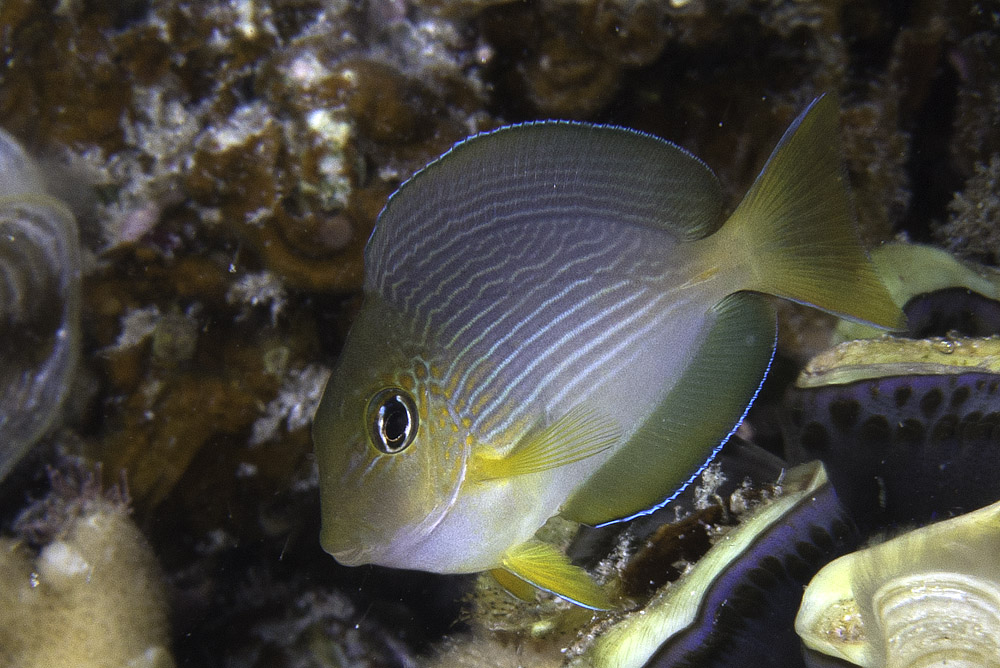
Juvenile, in the Red Sea

The sohal surgeonfish is endemic to the northwestern Indian Ocean, where it is found in the Red Sea, east along the coast of the Arabian Peninsula to the Persian Gulf. It has been found in the Mediterranean Sea, in 2017 and 2018, and reached there either by release from an aquarium or by Lessepsian migration through the Suez Canal from the Red Sea. It is usually found on the outer edges of fringing reefs that are exposed to surge, typically down to depths around 20 m (66 ft).

== Biology ==
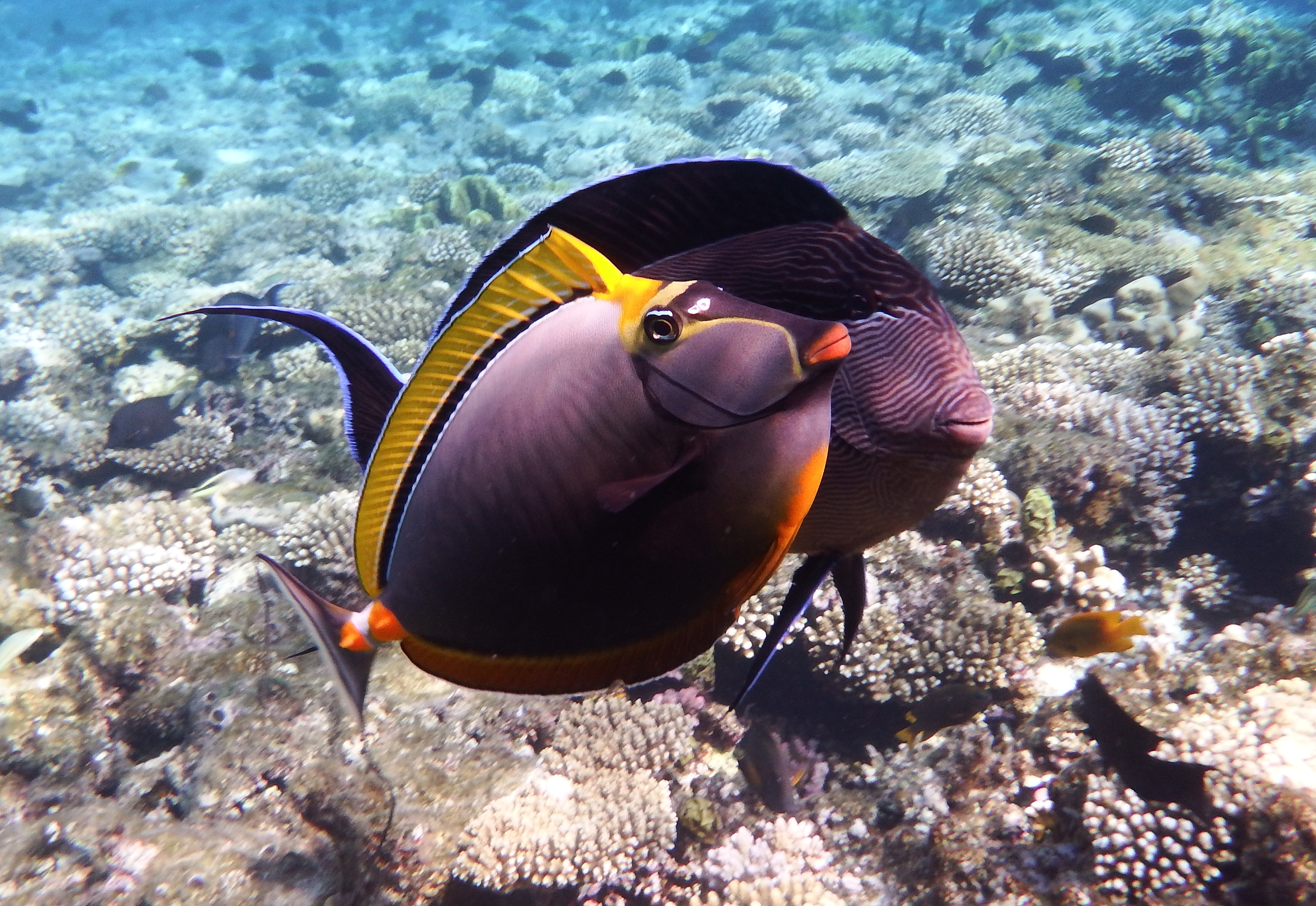
Fighting an elegant unicornfish

The sohal surgeonfish may be encountered either singly or in small schools and is known to be very territorial. The spine on the caudal peduncle has been reported to bear venom. It grazes on algae growing on hard substrates, and despite being solitary, it will school to graze in the territories of other fishes. The territory guards food resources and the territory holder may shelter and otherwise spend a lot of time out of its territory or patrolling its boundaries.

== Uses ==
The sohal surgeonfish is targeted by fisheries as a food fish and is also traded in the aquarium trade.
