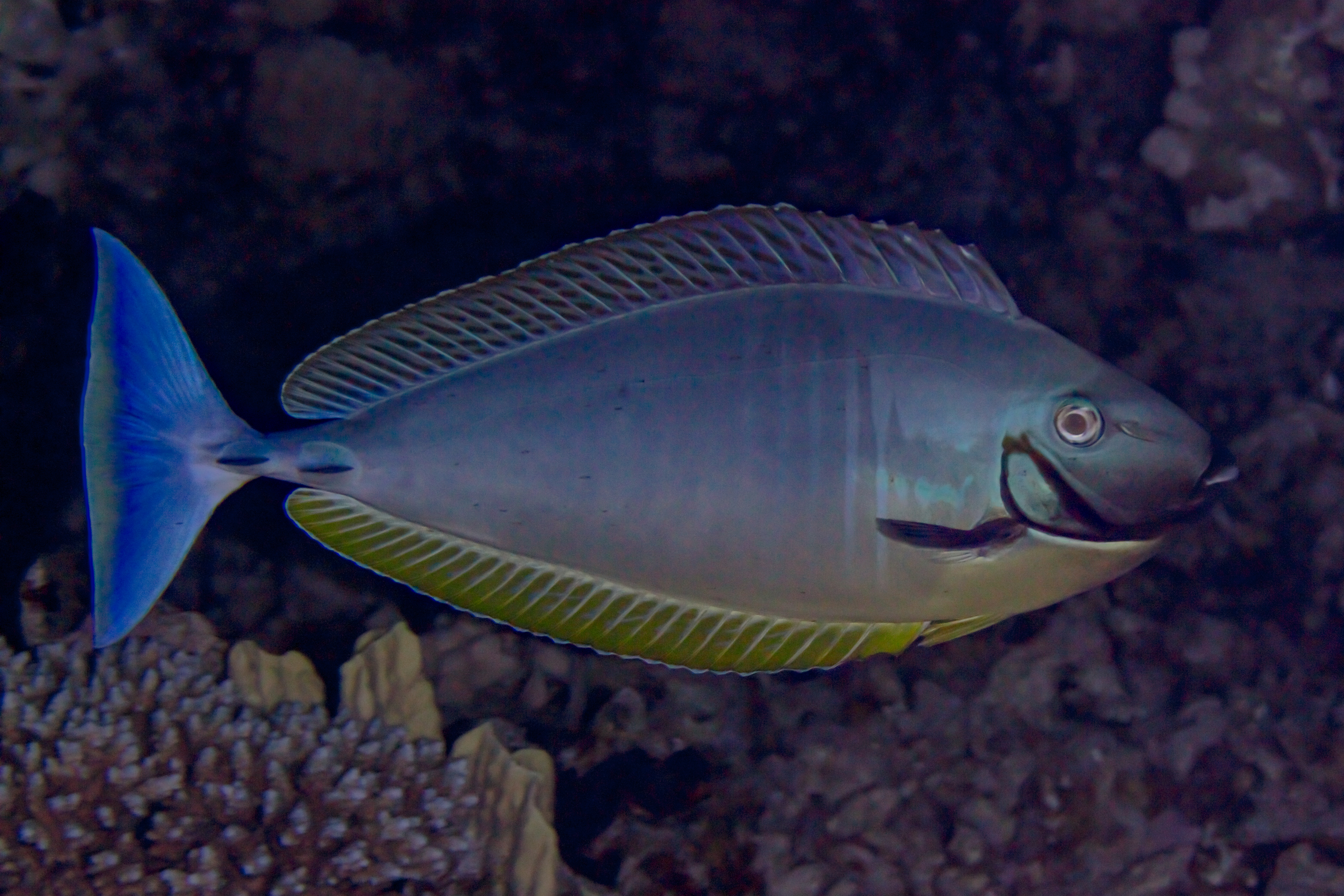
- In the Red Sea

Conservation status
- Least Concern (IUCN 3.1)

Scientific classification
- Kingdom: Animalia
- Phylum: Chordata
- Class: Actinopterygii
- Division: Teleostei
- Order: Acanthuriformes
- Family: Acanthuridae
- Genus: Naso
- Subgenus: Naso
- Species: N. hexacanthus

Binomial name
- Naso hexacanthus (Bleeker, 1855)

Synonyms
- Priodon hexacanthus Bleeker, 1855; Naseus vomer Klunzinger, 1871; Naso vomer (Klunzinger, 1871); Naso thorpei J. L. B. Smith, 1966

= Sleek unicornfish =

Species of fish

The sleek unicornfish (Naso hexacanthus), also known as the blue-tail unicorn, Thorpe's unicornfish, blacktongue unicornfish or ʻopelu kala, is a species of marine ray-finned fish belonging to the family Acanthuridae, the surgeonfishes, unicornfishes and tangs. This species is found in coral reefs in the Pacific and Indian Oceans. It is of value in commercial fisheries and as a game fish, and is also seen in aquaria.

== Taxonomy ==
The sleek unicornfish was first formally described as Priodon hexacanthus by the Dutch physician, herpetologist and ichthyologist Pieter Bleeker with its type locality given as Ambon Island in the Moluccas, Indonesia. This species is classified within the nominate subgenus of the genus Naso. The genus Naso is the only genus in the subfamily Nasinae in the family Acanthuridae.

== Etymology ==
The sleek unicornfish's specific name, hexacanthis means "six spines" and is an allusion to the six dorsal fin spines.

== Distribution and habitat ==
The sleek unicornfish is distributed in the Indo-Pacific, from the Hawaiian islands to Africa and India. It inhabits lagoons and seaward reef slopes. As the sleek unicornfish has a wide Indo-Pacific distribution the IUCN has classified its conservation status as Least Concern.

== Description ==
In Malaysia

The sleek unicornfish does not have a protuberance extending from its forehead, unlike some of its congeners. Its colors range from a dark brown to yellow, on occasion changing to blue or silver. Adults measure 75 centimeters in length. The teeth are angled backwards; the tongue is black.

== Ecology ==
The species consumes plankton and small crustaceans, as well as filamentous algae. It is the subject of moderate fisheries.
