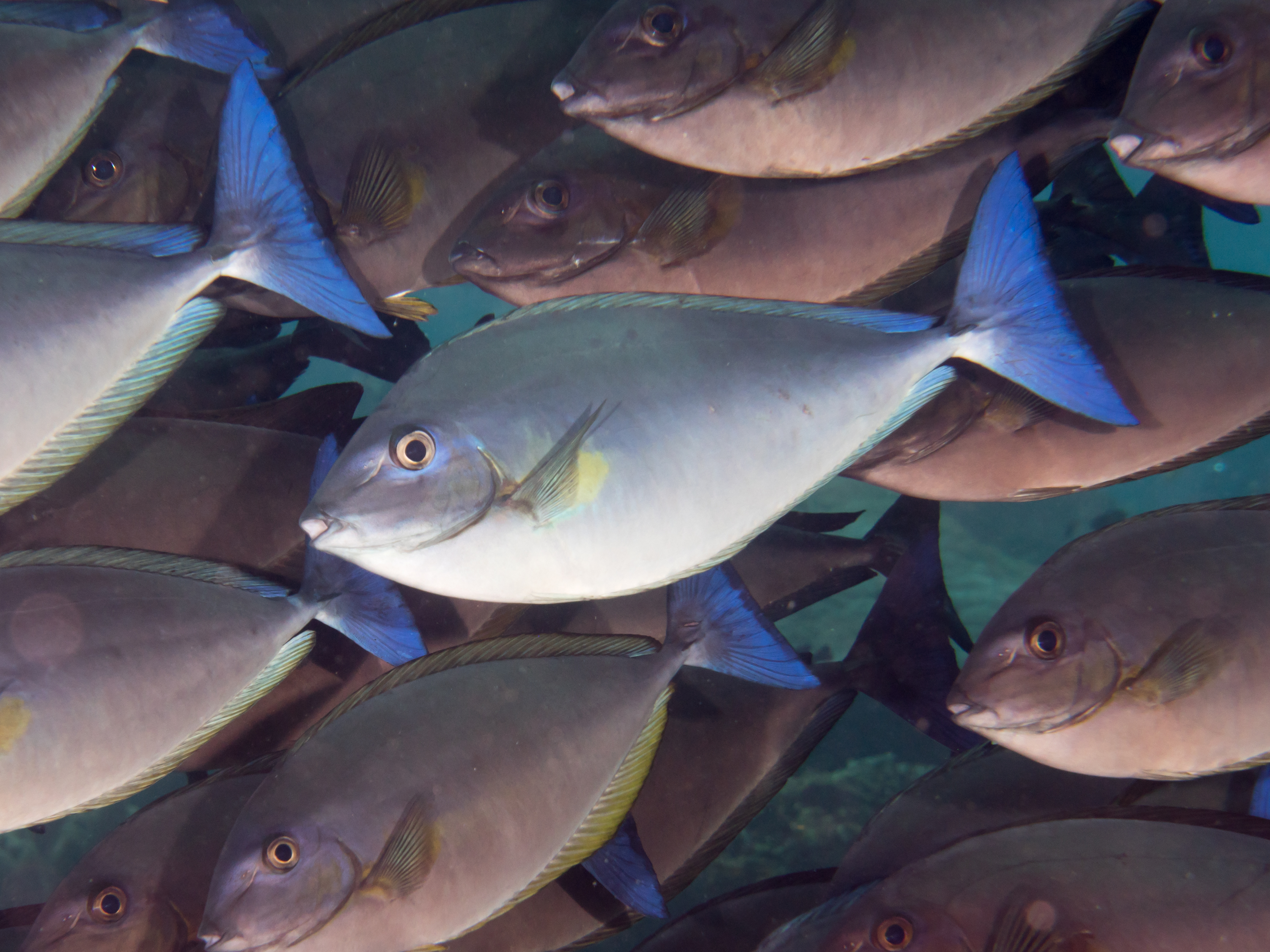

Conservation status
- Least Concern (IUCN 3.1)

Scientific classification
- Kingdom: Animalia
- Phylum: Chordata
- Class: Actinopterygii
- Order: Acanthuriformes
- Family: Acanthuridae
- Genus: Naso
- Subgenus: Axinurus
- Species: N. caeruleacauda

Binomial name
- Naso caeruleacauda J. E. Randall, 1994

= Bluetail unicornfish =

Species of fish

The bluetail unicornfish (Naso caeruleacauda), also known as the blue unicornfish, is a species of marine ray-finned fish belonging to the family Acanthuridae, the surgeonfishes, unicornfishes and tangs. This species is found in the western central Pacific Ocean.

== Taxonomy ==
The bluetail unicornfish was first formally described in 1994 by the American ichthyologist John Ernest Randall with its type locality given as Dumaguete on Negros in the Philippines. This species is classified in the subgenus Axinurus within the genus Naso. The genus Naso is the only genus in the subfamily Nasinae in the family Acanthuridae.

== Etymology ==
The bluetail unicornfish has the specific name caeruleacauda and this means "blue tail", an allusion to its "most striking color feature", the blue caudal fin,

== Description ==
The bluetail unicornfish has its dorsal fin supported by 4 or 5 spines and 28 to 30 soft rays while the anal fin contains 2 spines and 29 soft rays. Their body has a standard length which is between 2.75 and 2.8 times its depth. The dorsal profile of the head between the upper lip and the intraorbital space is straight. There is a bulge between the eyes and the nostrils. The caudal fin is blue and the colour in life is bluish grey or brownish grey, paler in colour, even yellowish, on the lower body. There is a yellow patch beneath the pectoral fins. The maximum published total length of this species is 40 cm (16 in) and the maximum weight is 1.1 kg (2.4 lb).

== Distribution and habitat ==
The bluetail unicornfish is found in the western central Pacific in Indonesia, the Philippines and the Great Barrier Reef of Australia. It has also been recorded off northeastern Madagascar. This species forms schools over steep seaward sloped, typically at depths in excess of 15 m (49 ft).
