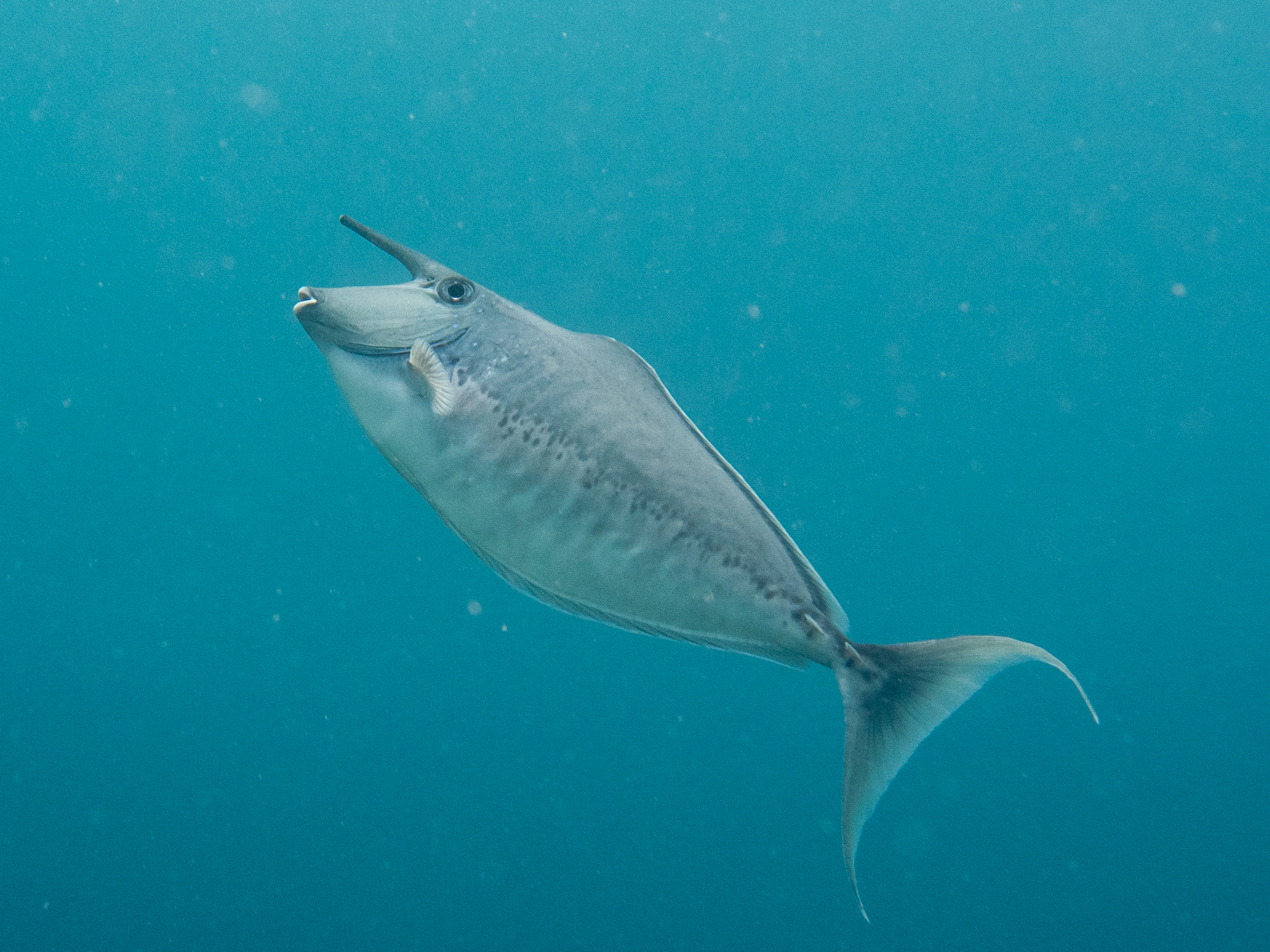
- In the Maldives

Conservation status
- Least Concern (IUCN 3.1)

Scientific classification
- Kingdom: Animalia
- Phylum: Chordata
- Class: Actinopterygii
- Order: Acanthuriformes
- Family: Acanthuridae
- Genus: Naso
- Subgenus: Naso
- Species: N. brachycentron

Binomial name
- Naso brachycentron (Valenciennes, 1835)

Synonyms
- Naseus brachycentron Valenciennes, 1835; Prionolepis hewitti J. L. B. Smith, 1931; Naso rigoletto J. L. B. Smith, 1951

= Naso brachycentron =

Species of fish

Naso brachycentron, the humpback unicornfish, is a species of marine ray-finned fish belonging to the family Acanthuridae, the surgeonfishes, unicornfishes and tangs. This species is found in the Indian and western Pacific Oceans.

== Taxonomy ==
Naso brachycentron was first formally described as Naseus brachycentron by the French zoologist Achille Valenciennes with its type locality given as Waigeo in Indonesia. It is classified within the nominate subgenus of the genus Naso. The genus Naso is the only genus in the subfamily Nasinae in the family Acanthuridae.

== Etymology ==
Naso brachycentron has a specific name which combines brachy, meaning "short", with centron, which means "thorn" or "spine". This is an allusion to the shorter spines in the dorsal fin when compared to the type species of Naso, N. fronticornis.

== Description ==
Naso brachycentron has 4 or 5 spines and between 28 and 30 soft rays supporting the dorsal fin while the anal fin is supported by 2 spines and 27 or 28 soft rays. The depth of the body fits into its standard length between 2.2 and 2.7 times. In fish with a standard length greater than about 20 cm (7.9 in) a hump begins to develop in the back so that the dorsal profile is concave between the intraorbital area and the soft-rayed portion of the dorsal fin. The snout is steeply sloped and in the adult males there is a long, tapering bony protuberance in front of the eyes which may extend past the mouth in adult males but is a small bump in females. A pair of bony plates with a blade-like keel are on each side of the caudal peduncle. The overall colour is grey on the upper body and head and paler yellowish or whitish on the lower body with the coloured areas irregularly demarcated. There are frequently blue spots behind the eyes and the larger males may have dark bars on the lower flanks. This is a relatively large species reaching a maximum published fork length of 90 cm (35 in).

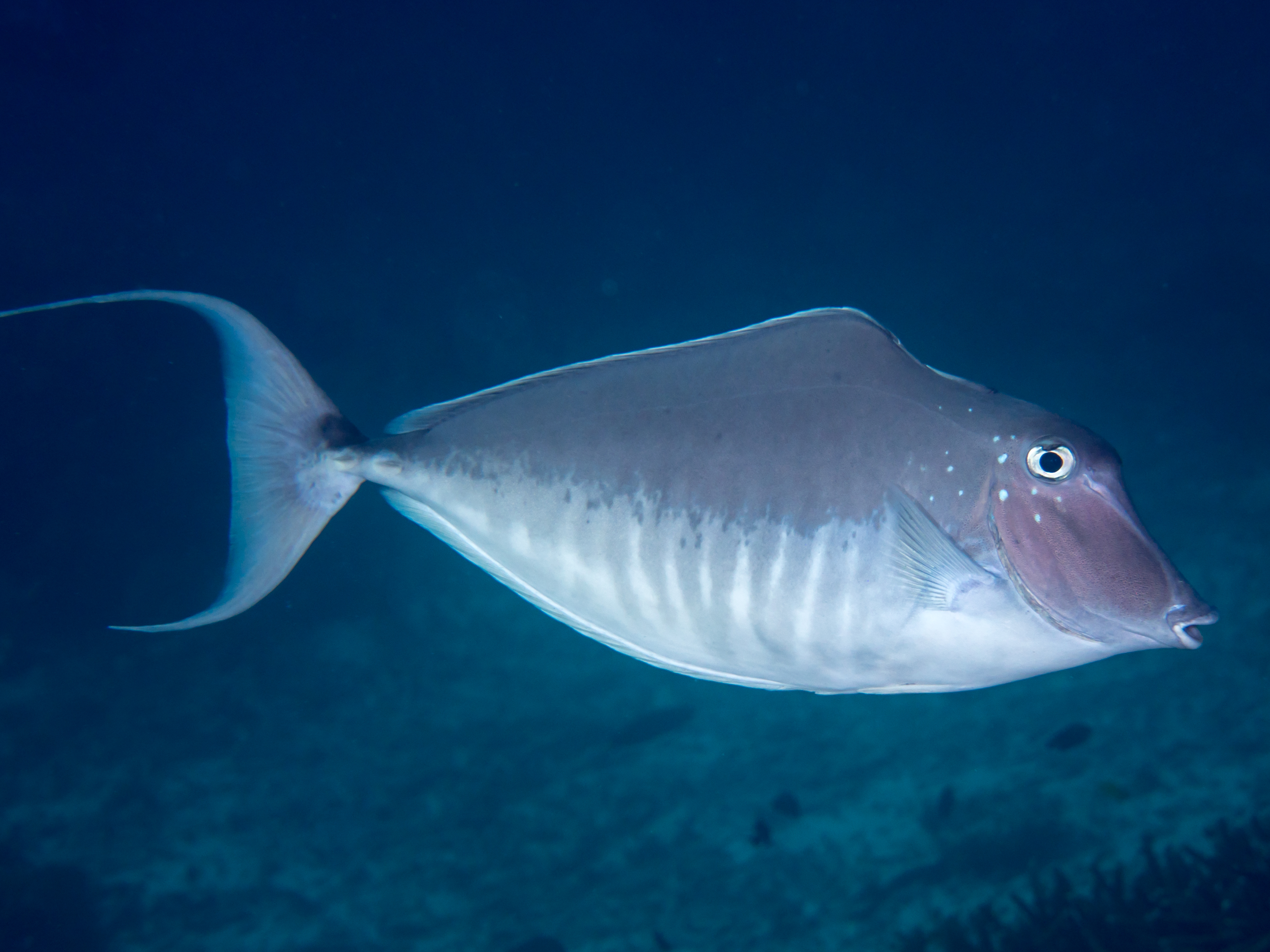
Female

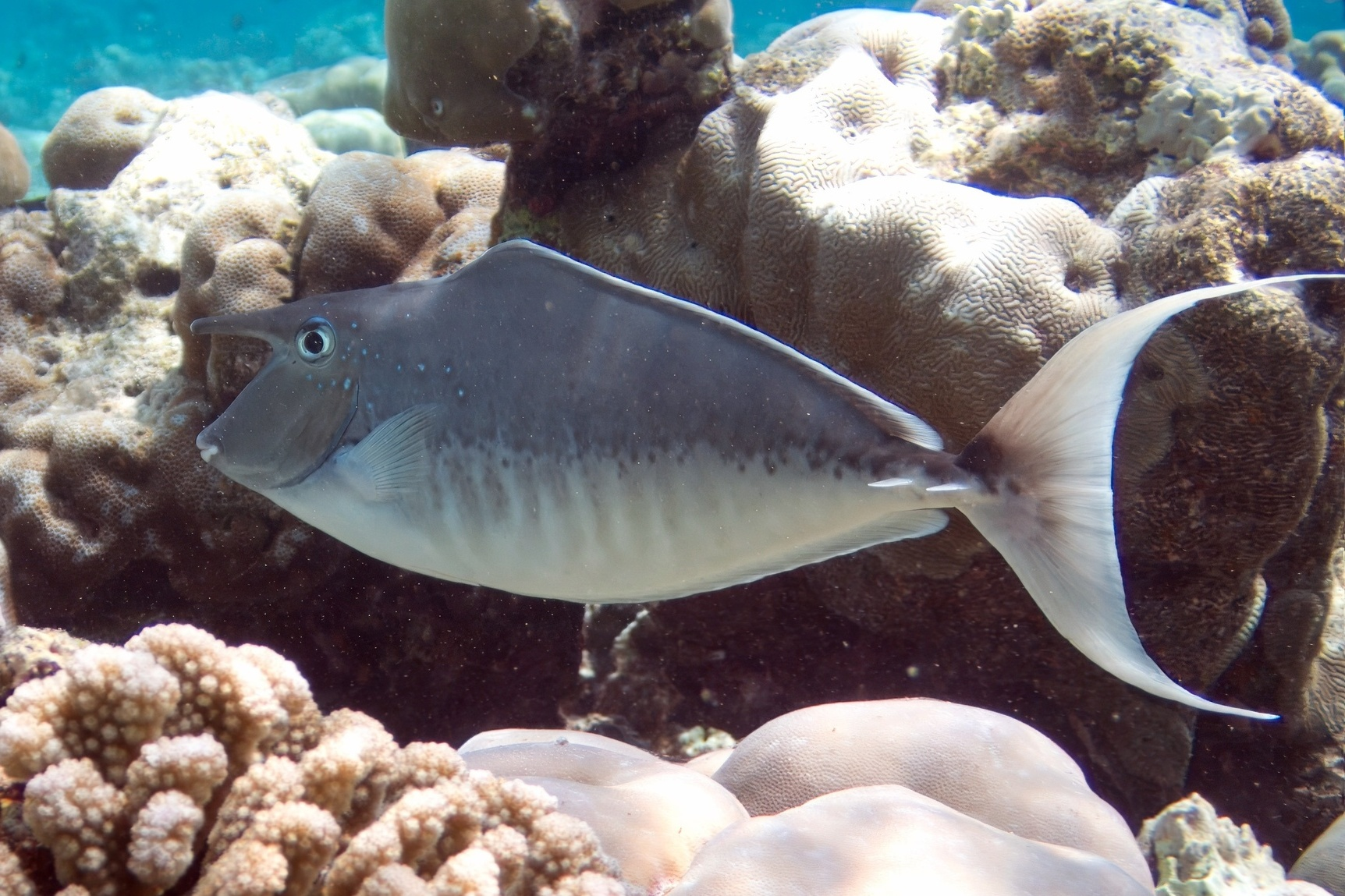
Male

== Distribution and habitat ==
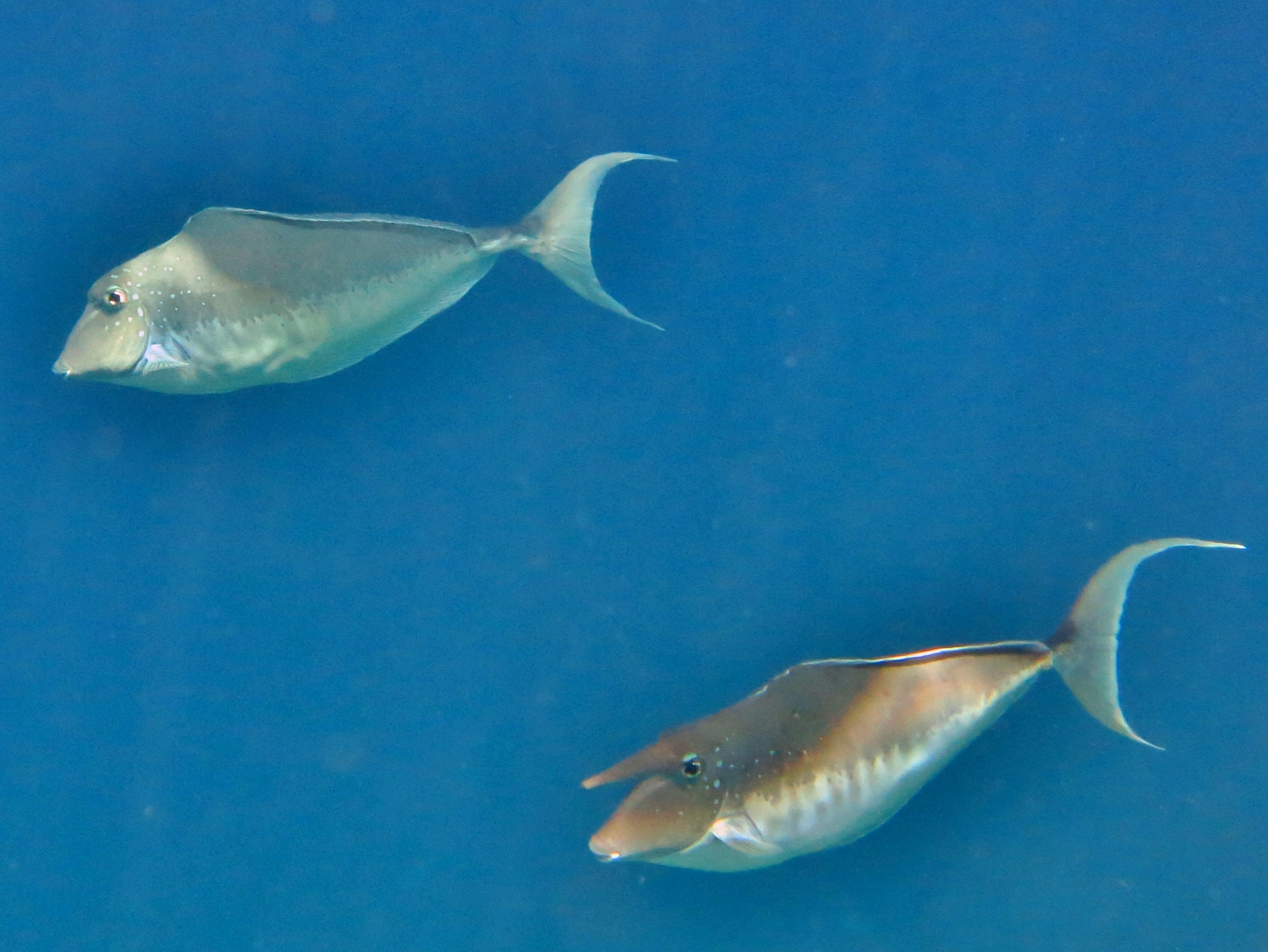
Female (top) and male (bottom)

Naso brachycentron has a wide distribution in the Indian and Pacific Oceans, although it is absent from the Red Sea, the Gulf of Oman and the Persian Gulf. It is found along the eastern coast of Africa from Kenya in the north to Sodwana Bay in South Africa, through most of the islands of the Indian Ocean east into the Pacific Ocean where it reaches east to French Polynesia and the Mariana Islands, north to the Ryukyu Islands and south to the Great Barrier Reef of Australia. They are found as solitary fish or in small aggregations in shallow reef areas.
