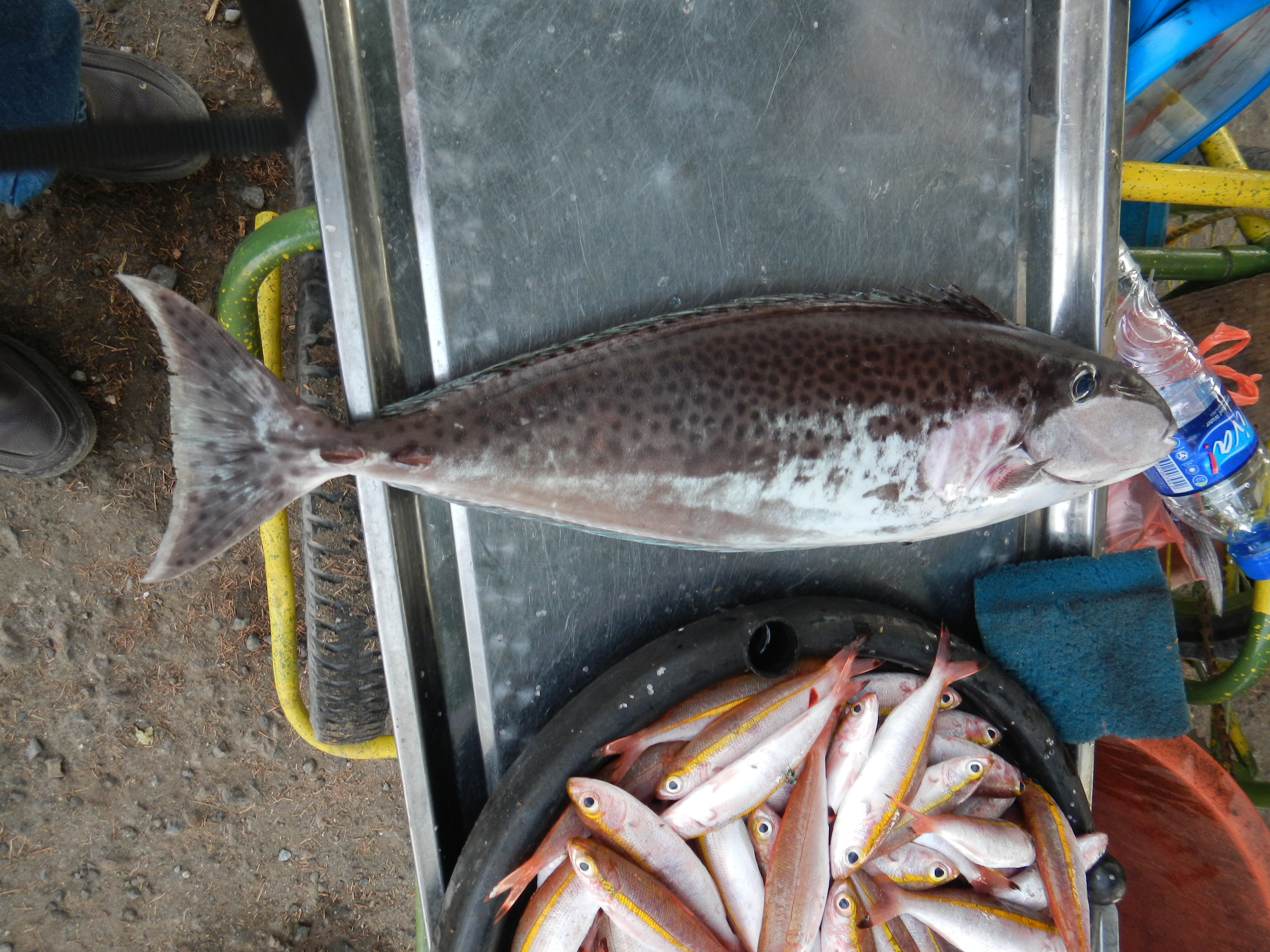
- In the Philippines

Conservation status
- Least Concern (IUCN 3.1)

Scientific classification
- Kingdom: Animalia
- Phylum: Chordata
- Class: Actinopterygii
- Order: Acanthuriformes
- Family: Acanthuridae
- Genus: Naso
- Subgenus: Naso
- Species: N. lopezi

Binomial name
- Naso lopezi Herre, 1927

= Naso lopezi =

Species of fish

Naso lopezi, the elongated unicornfish, slender unicornfish or Lopez' unicornfish, is a species of marine ray-finned fish belonging to the family Acanthuridae, the surgeon fishes, unicornfishes and tangs. This species is found in the western Pacific Ocean.

== Taxonomy ==
Naso lopezi was first formally described in 1923 by the Norwegian-born American ichthyologist Albert William Herre with its type locality given as Ambil Island southwest of Manila Bay in the Philippines. This species is classified within the nominate subgenus of the genus Naso. The genus Naso is the only genus in the subfamily Nasinae in the family Acanthuridae.

== Etymology ==
Naso lopezi has a specific name which honours G. A. Lopez. Lopez was a specimen collector for the Philippine Bureau of Science but it is not known whether he collected the type specimen of this species. It is thought the type was destroyed in the Second World War.

== Description ==
Naso lopezi has an elongate body which has a depth which fits into its standard length between 3.3 and 3.7 times. This is on epof the species in the genus Naso which does not possess a bony protuberance, or horn, on the forehead. The dorsal fin is supported by 5 spines and between 27 and 30 soft rays while the anal fin is supported by 2 spines and 26 to 30 soft rays. The overall colour is greyish with dense black spotting on the upper body and caudal fin, This species has a maximum published total length of 60 cm (24 in).

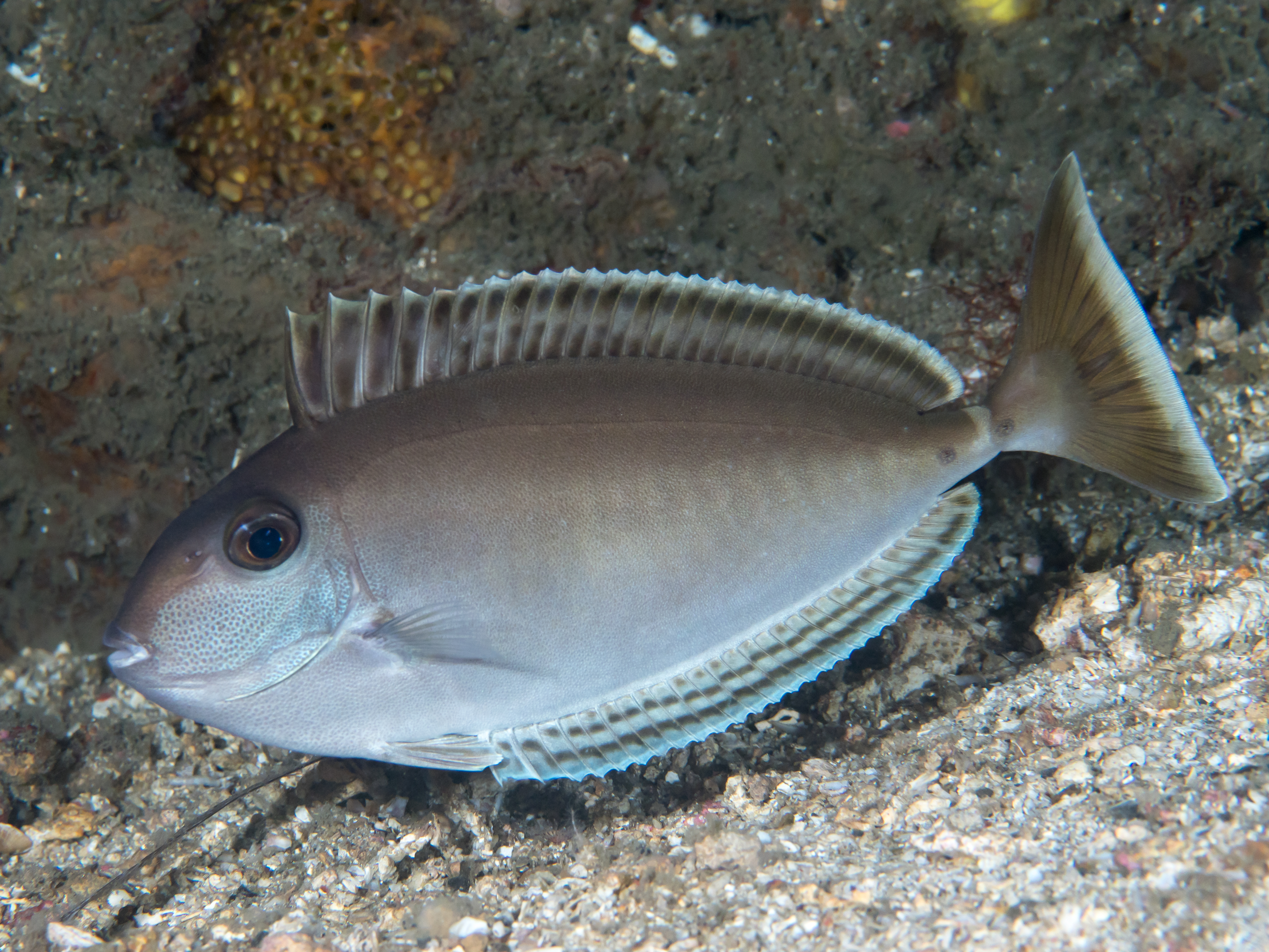
Juvenile in nocturnal colouration

== Distribution and habitat ==
Naso lopezi is found in the Western Pacific Ocean. It extends as far north as Honshu in Japan, south to the Great Barrier Reef, the Capricorn Group and reefs in the Coral Sea and east to New Caledonia. There have also been reports from the Similan Islands in Thailand and Tonga. The elongate unicornfish is typically found in areas of the outer reef slopes where there is a strong current, usually at depths greater than 6 m (20 ft).

== Biology ==
Naso lopezi feeds largely on ctenophores and crustaceans, they will also eat algae, diatoms, dinoflagellates and molluscs. They have been observed to gather in large schools to feed during daylight hours in the Philippines. These feed in the upper part of the water column in the middle of the day and near the bottom in the early morning and late afternoon.

== Fisheries ==
Naso lopezi is a target for fisheries in the Philippines.
