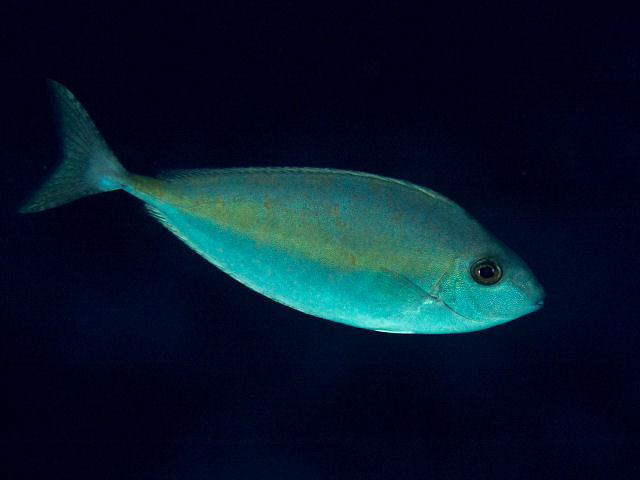

Conservation status
- Least Concern (IUCN 3.1)

Scientific classification
- Kingdom: Animalia
- Phylum: Chordata
- Class: Actinopterygii
- Order: Acanthuriformes
- Family: Acanthuridae
- Genus: Naso
- Subgenus: Axinurus
- Species: N. thynnoides

Binomial name
- Naso thynnoides (Cuvier, 1829)

Synonyms
- Axinurus thynnoides Cuvier, 1829

= Naso thynnoides =

Species of fish

Naso thynnoides, the oneknife unicornfish, oneknife unicorn, thunny unicornfish, singlespine unicornfish, one-spine unicorn, or barred unicornfish, is a species of marine ray-finned fish belonging to the family Acanthuridae, the surgeonfishes, unicornfishes and tangs. This species is found in the Indo-Pacific.

== Taxonomy ==
Naso thynnoides was first formally described in 1829 as Axinurus thynnoides by the French zoologist Georges Cuvier with its type locality given as Dorey Harbour in Papua New Guinea. This species is classified in the subgenus Axinurus within the genus Naso. The genus Naso is the only genus in the subfamily Nasinae in the family Acanthuridae.

== Etymology ==
Naso thynnoides has the specific name thynnoides, which means "tuna-like" which Achille Valenciennes explained in 1835 was an allusion to the more elongated and compressed body of this species, like that of a tuna.

== Description ==
Naso thynnoides has its dorsal fin supported by 5 or 6 spines and 28 to 30 soft rays while the anal fin is supported by 2 spines and between 28 and 30 soft rays. This is a relatively slender unicornfish with the standard length being around three times the body's depth. The head does not have any form of protuberance and is smoothly rounded. There is a short, diagonal groove in front of the eye and below the nostrils. There is a single bony plate on each side of the caudal peduncle and this has a small, semicircular keel. The overall colour is grey fading on the underside. There are around 30 bluish horizontal stripes along the back and flanks, breaking into irregular shaped spots on the head. There is an indistinct yellowish horizontal stripe along the flanks. The bony plates and keels on the caudal peduncle are dusky and the caudal fin is bluish grey. This species has a maximum published fork length of 40 cm (16 in).

== Distribution and habitat ==
Naso thynnoides is found across the Indian Ocean and into the Pacific Ocean. In the Indian Ocean it is found along the eastern coast of Africa from Kenya south to Mozambique, the Comoro Islands, Madagascar, Seychelles, Mascarene Islands, the Maldives, Sri Lanka, Nicobar Islands, Andaman Islands and the Andaman Sea coasts of Myanmar, Thailand and Malaysia through the Malay Archipelago into the Pacific north to the Ryukyu Islands, east to the American Samoa, Johnston Atoll and Tuamoto islands and south to the Great Barrier Reef. This fish is found on steep outward reef and lagoon slopes at depths of between 2 and 40 m (6 ft 7 in and 131 ft 3 in)

== Biology ==
Naso thynnoides feeds on zooplankton and is typically found in small schools. They are diurnal and at night they sleep on the reef, changing colour to adopt a disruptive camouflage. They also visit the reef to be cleaned by cleaner wrasse of the genus Labroides
