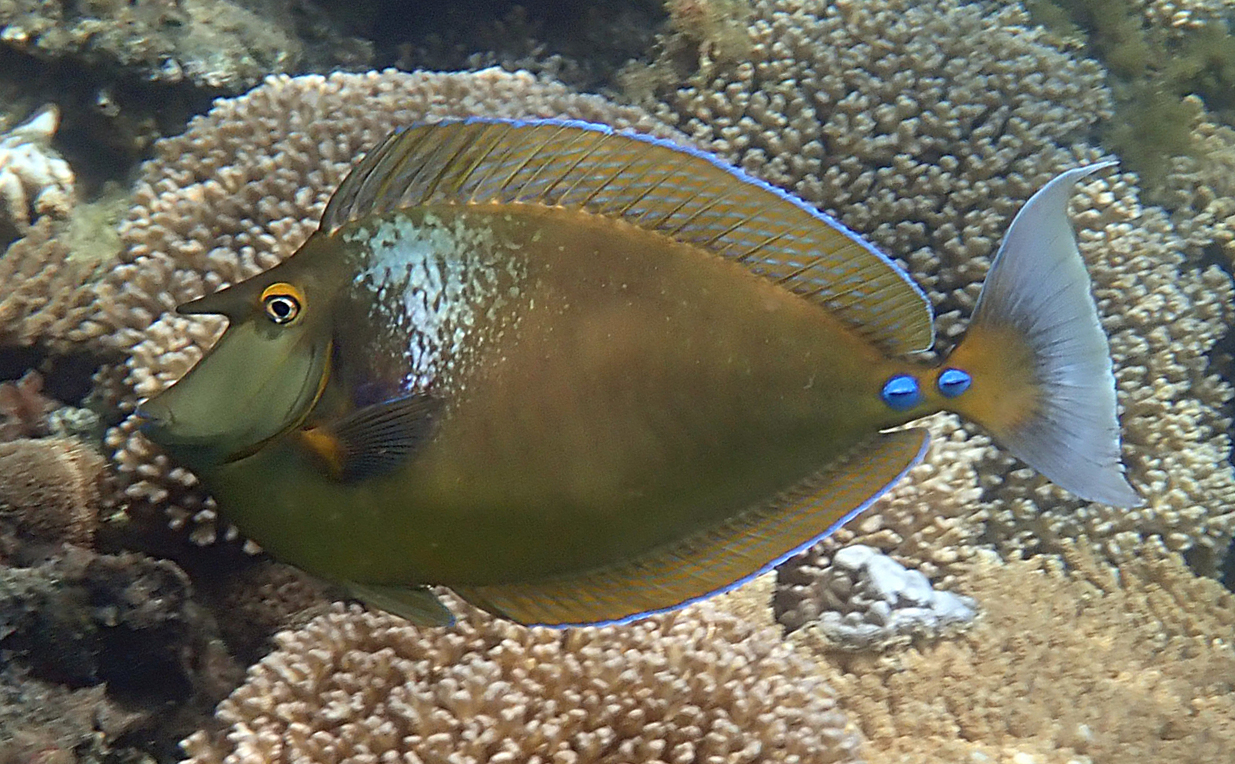
- Bluespine unicornfish (N. unicornis)

Scientific classification
- Kingdom: Animalia
- Phylum: Chordata
- Class: Actinopterygii
- Division: Teleostei
- Order: Acanthuriformes
- Family: Acanthuridae
- Subfamily: Nasinae; Fowler & Bean, 1929
- Genus: Naso; Lacépède, 1801

Type species
- Acanthurus fronticornis Lacépède, 1801

Species
- 20., see text

Synonyms
- List: Atulonotus J. L. B. Smith, 1955; Axinurus Cuvier, 1829; Callicanthus Swainson 1839; Cyphomycter Fowler & Bean, 1929; Keris Valenciennes, 1835; Monoceros Bloch & Schneider, 1801; Nasonus Rafinesque, 1815; Priodon Quoy & Gaimard, 1825; Priodontichthys Bonaparte, 1831; Prionolepis J. L. B. Smith, 1931; Rhinodactylus J. L. B. Smith, 1957

= Naso (fish) =

Naso Temporal range: Eocene to present

Genus of fishes

Naso is a genus of marine ray-finned fishes belonging to the family, Acanthuridae, the unicornfishes, surgeonfishes and tangs. The fishes in this genus are known commonly as unicornfishes because of the "rostral protuberance", a hornlike extension of the forehead present in some species.

Unicorn fish are popular with spearfishermen and may be cooked by grilling them whole. Unicornfish primarily live around coral reefs and eat mostly algae.

This genus is distributed across the Indo-Pacific from Africa to Hawaii.

== Taxonomy ==
Naso was first proposed as a genus in 1801 by Bernard Germain de Lacépède when he described Naso fronticornis as a new species from Jeddah and Mauritius. Lacépède's name was an unnecessary replacement of Chaetodon unicornis described by Peter Forsskål in 1775 from Jeddah. In 1917 David Starr Jordan designated Naso fronticornis as the type species of the genus Naso. Naso is the only genus in the monogeneric subfamily Nasinae, proposed by Henry Weed Fowler and Barton Appler Bean in 1929 within the family Acanthuridae.

=== Etymology ===
Naso means "nose" referring to the fleshy protuberance on the forehead of N. fronticornis (=unicornis). The subgenus Axinurus comes from axino and oura, meaning axe-tail, potentially referring to the presence of a single tail spine on each side as opposed to two in the subgenus Naso.

== Distribution ==
Naso unicornfishes are found in the Indo-Pacific region from the eastern coast of Africa to the Galápagos Islands.

== Characteristics ==
Naso unicornfishes have a pointed snout and a rhomboidal or oval shaped body, with some species possessing a long protuberance on the forehead, typically present in both males and females. The caudal peduncle is slender and there are 1 or 2 anteriorly directed sharp, blade-shaped spines mounted on bony plates on each side. The caudal fin varies from slightly rounded to highly emarginate. In some species there are long filaments at the tips of the lobes of the caudal fin, sometimes restricted to males. The dorsal fins of these fishes are supported by between 4 and 7 spines and between 24 and 31 soft rays while the anal fin contains 2 spines and 23 to 30 soft rays. There is a single spine and 3 soft rays in the pelvic fins and between 16 and 19 soft rays in the pectoral fins.

The species in the genus Naso vary in size from a maximum published standard length of 30 cm (12 in) in the slender unicorn (N. minor) to a maximum published total length of 100 cm (39 in) in the whitemargin unicornfish (N. annulatus).

There are two subgenera which are distinguished by the number of keels on the caudal peduncle with the nominate subgenus, Naso having a pair on each side of the peduncle while the subgenus Axinurus has a single keel on each side.

== Biology ==
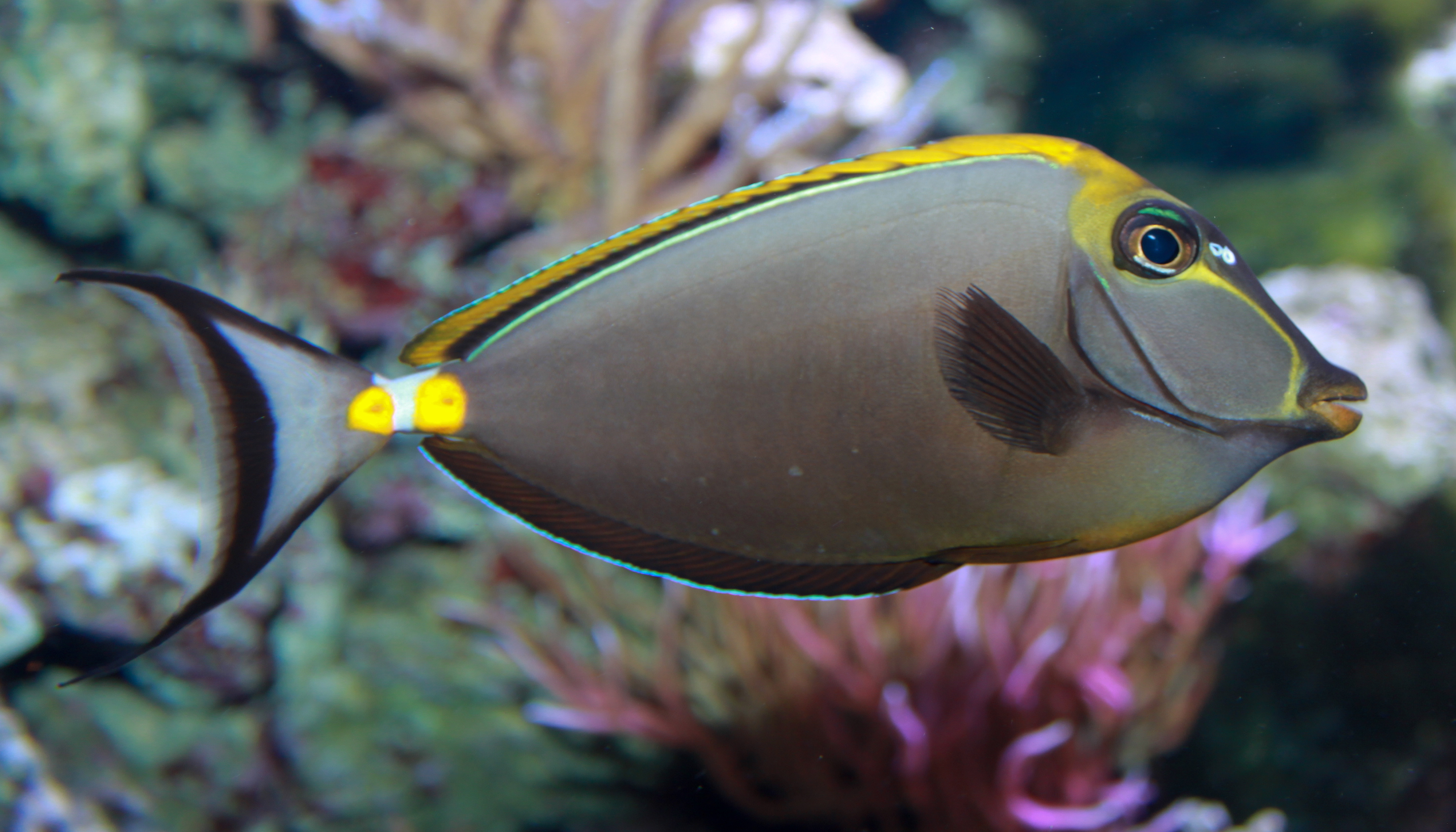
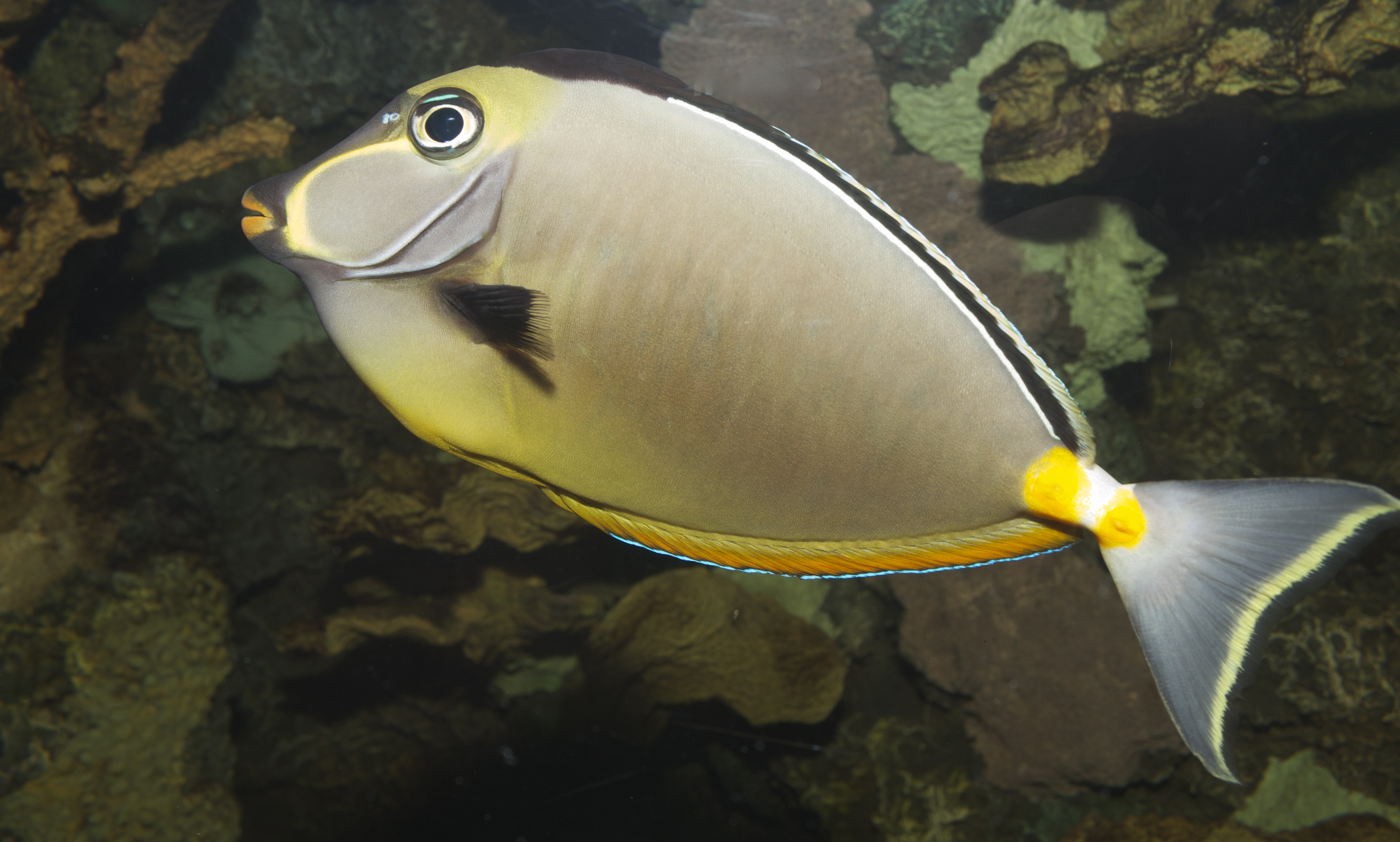
N. elegans (top) and N. lituratus (bottom) are closely related, and once considered the same species.

Naso unicornfishes differ from other acanthurids in that they eat zooplankton rather than grazing on algae or detritus and that they tend to live at greater ranges of depth.

=== Cephalic horn function ===
Some species exhibit a large horn on the forehead. It is uncertain what the purpose of this horn is. One explanation postulates that is a result of sexual selection, ie serving a purpose in competition and communication, which may be within or between the sexes, or both. Alternatively, it has been hypothesized that they instead perform a hydrodynamic function, assisting the species that exhibit them with precision movements. This is because both fast swimming "scombriform" shaped species and small species typically lack the horn, while it is only the large relatively slow-swimming species which display the horn.

Molecular phylogenetics show that horns independently evolved multiple times within the genus, and only ever evolved in benthic feeding species. Similarly, benthic-feeding also evolved multiple times independently. In addition, pelagic feeding and the fast-swimming "scombriform" body shape appear to be plesiomorphic traits. This is because the basalmost species in Naso are the pelagic feeding "scombriform" species in the subgenus Axinurus, and because every other acanthurid genus comprises predominantly benthic feeders.

In some species, both males and females display such a horn. In at least some species where this is the case, such as the bluespine unicornfish, the horn is slightly sexually dimorphic, being slightly larger in males. In other species, such as the humpback unicornfish, the horn is almost completely absent in females.

== Species ==
Naso is divided into two subgenera and 20 species are classified within it:

Subgenus Naso Lacepède, 1801
Species	Common name	Image
Naso annulatus (Quoy & Gaimard, 1825)	whitemargin unicornfish	
Naso brachycentron (Valenciennes, 1835)	humpback unicornfish	
Naso brevirostris (G. Cuvier, 1829)	spotted unicornfish	
Naso caesius J. E. Randall & Bell, 1992	gray unicornfish	
Naso elegans (Rüppell, 1829)	elegant unicornfish	
Naso fageni Morrow, 1954	horseface unicornfish	
Naso hexacanthus (Bleeker, 1855)	sleek unicornfish	
Naso lituratus (J. R. Forster, 1801)	orangespine unicornfish	
Naso lopezi Herre, 1927	elongated unicornfish	
Naso maculatus J. E. Randall & Struhsaker, 1981	spotted unicornfish	
Naso mcdadei J. W. Johnson, 2002	squarenose unicornfish	
Naso reticulatus J. E. Randall, 2001	reticulated unicornfish	
Naso tergus H. C. Ho, K. N. Shen & C. W. Chang, 2011	Taiwanese unicornfish	
Naso tonganus (Valenciennes, 1835)	bulbnose unicornfish	
Naso tuberosus Lacépède, 1801	humpnose unicornfish	
Naso unicornis (Forsskål, 1775)	bluespine unicornfish	
Naso vlamingii (Valenciennes, 1835)	bignose unicornfish	

Subgenus Axinurus Cuvier 1829
Species	Common name	Image
Naso caeruleacauda J. E. Randall, 1994	blue unicornfish	
Naso minor (J. L. B. Smith, 1966)	slender unicornfish	
Naso thynnoides (G. Cuvier, 1829)	oneknife unicornfish	
