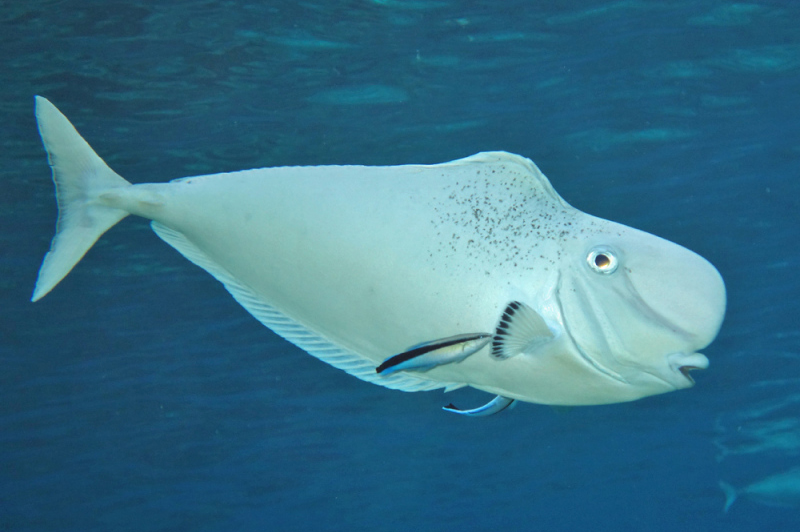

Conservation status
- Least Concern (IUCN 3.1)

Scientific classification
- Kingdom: Animalia
- Phylum: Chordata
- Class: Actinopterygii
- Order: Acanthuriformes
- Family: Acanthuridae
- Genus: Naso
- Subgenus: Naso
- Species: N. tonganus

Binomial name
- Naso tonganus (Valenciennes, 1835)

Synonyms
- Naseus tonganus Valenciennes, 1835

= Naso tonganus =

Species of surgeonfish

Naso tonganus, the bulbnose unicornfish, hump-nosed unicornfish, humphead unicornfish, or the humpnose unicorn, is a species of marine ray-finned fish belonging to the family Acanthuridae, the surgeonfishes, unicornfishes and tangs. This species is found in the Indo-Pacific. It is of value in commercial fisheries.

== Taxonomy ==
Naso tonganus was first formally described as Naseus tonganus in 1835 by the French zoologist Achille Valenciennes with its type locality given as Tongatapu in Tonga. This species is classified within the nominate subgenus of the genus Naso. The genus Naso is the only genus in the subfamily Nasinae in the family Acanthuridae.

== Etymology ==
Naso tonganus has the specific name tonganus, a reference to its type locality of Tonga.

== Distribution and habitat ==
Naso tonganus has a wide Indo-Pacific distribution. In the Western Indian Ocean it ranges from the eastern coast of Africa between Somalia and KwaZulu-Natal, Madagascar, the Comoros, the Seychelles and the Mascarenes. It is found around the Maldives but appears to be absent from the continental coast of South Asia. It then occurs from Thailand east to the Samoan Islands, north to the Ryukyu Islands of southern Japan and south to Australia. In Australia it has been recorded from Shark Bay to the North West Cape in Western Australia, the Ashmore Reef, the far north of the Great Barrier Reef and reefs in the Coral Sea as far south as Jervis Bay in New South Wales. It also occurs at Christmas Island and the Cocos (Keeling) Islands.

== Description ==
Naso tonganus has a dorsal fin which is supported by 5 spines and between 27 and 30 soft rays while the anal fin is supported by 2 spines and 26 to 28 soft rays. There are between 22 and 46 teeth in each jaw. the number increasing as the fish grows, and these have serrated tips. The depth of the body fits into the standard length around 2.3 to 3 times, adults having less deep bodies than subadults. The adults have a bulging protuberance on the front of the head, in larger males this may extend beyond the mouth. The dorsal profile of the body is clearly convex underneath the spiny part of the dorsal fin. There is a pair of bony plates on either side of the caudal peduncle and each has a forward projecting point. The caudal fin is emarginate in juveniles and truncate in adults.

The overall colour is silvery to brownish-grey, shading to yellowish-grey on the ventral part of the body. There is an irregular pattern of pale and black spots below the spiny part of the dorsal fin. The dorsal fin is dark with a blue margin and there is a wide blackish submarginal band on the pectoral and caudal fins. Juveniles are covered in dense, dark spotting.

This species has attained a maximum published standard length of 60 cm (24 in).

== Biology ==
This species is often solitary but may be found in small groups on coral reefs where they feed on zooplankton and algae.
