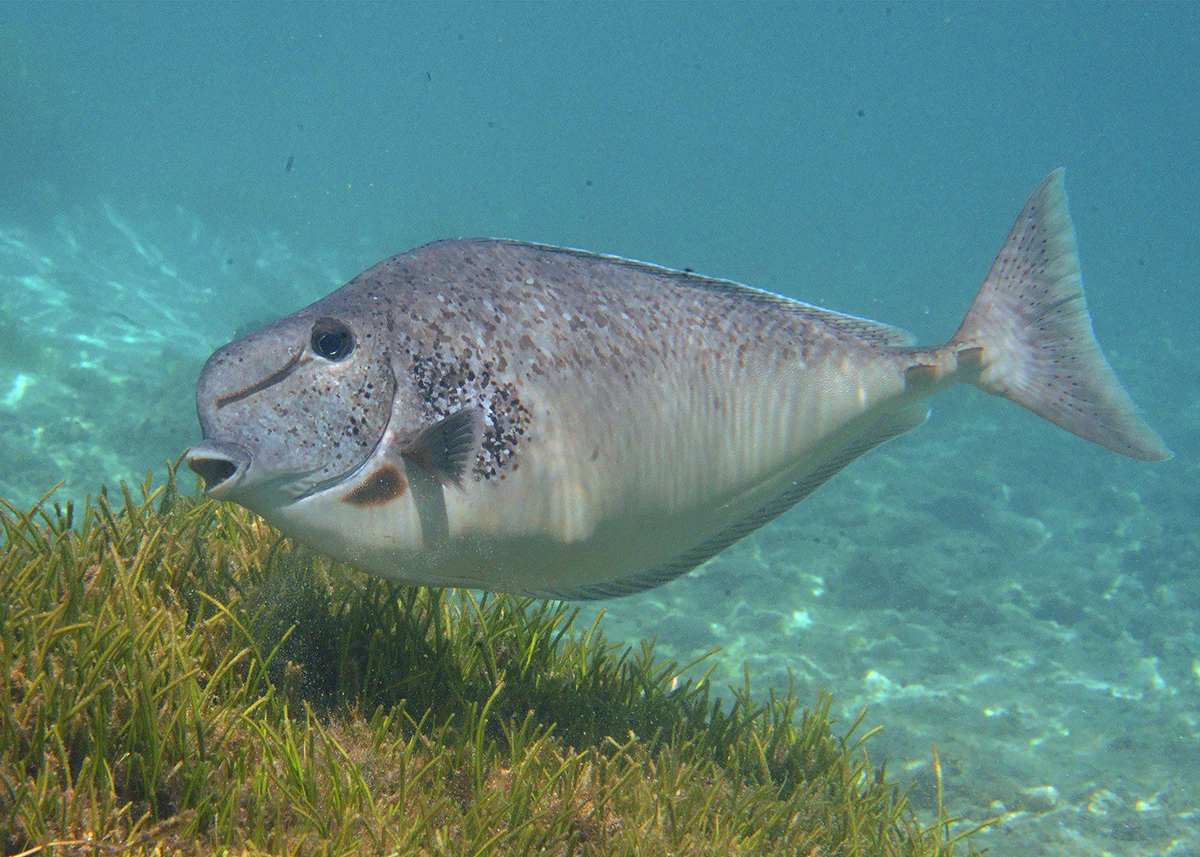

Conservation status
- Data Deficient (IUCN 3.1)

Scientific classification
- Kingdom: Animalia
- Phylum: Chordata
- Class: Actinopterygii
- Order: Acanthuriformes
- Family: Acanthuridae
- Genus: Naso
- Subgenus: Naso
- Species: N. tuberosus

Binomial name
- Naso tuberosus Lacépède, 1801

= Naso tuberosus =

Species of fish

Naso tuberosus, the humpnose unicornfish, is a species of marine ray-finned fish belonging to the family Acanthuridae, the surgeonfishes, unicornfishes and tangs. This species occurs in the Indian Ocean but it may be more widespread.

== Taxonomy ==
Naso tuberosus was first formally described in 1801 by the French naturalist Bernard Germain de Lacépède with its type locality given as Mauritius. This species is classified within the nominate subgenus of the genus Naso. The genus Naso is the only genus in the subfamily Nasinae in the family Acanthuridae.

== Etymology ==
Naso tuberosus has the specific name tuberosus, meaning "lumpy", a reference to the bulging protuberance on the front of its head.

== Description ==
Naso tuberosus has a dorsal fin which is supported by 5 spines and between 26 and 29 soft rays while the anal fin is supported by 2 spines and 26 to 28 soft rays. There are between 30 and 46 teeth in each jaw. the number increasing as the fish grows, and these have serrated tips. The depth of the body fits into the standard length around 2.3 to 2.7 times, adults having less deep bodies than subadults. The adults have a bulging protuberance on the front of the head, this never extends beyond the mouth. The dorsal profile of the body is weakly convex underneath the spiny part of the dorsal fin. There is a pair of bony plates on either side of the caudal peduncle and each has a keel with a forward projecting point. The caudal fin is very emarginate in juveniles and slightly emarginate in adults. The overall colour is greyish with small blackish spots on the upper part of the body. A large black spot is located underneath and to the front of the base of the pectoral fins. This species has attained a maximum published standard length of 60 cm (24 in).

== Distribution and habitat ==
Naso tuberosus is an uncommon species found in the Indian Ocean, it may occur in the western Pacific Ocean but this many, if not all records, outside the Pacific Ocean may refer to Naso tonganus. The humpnose unicornfish has been recorded from the eastern coast of Africa from Somalia as far south as Sodwana Bay in South Africa, the Comoro Islands, Madagascar, the Seychelles, the Mascarenes and from Yemen. It has also been found at Rottnest Island in Western Australia and from the Cocos (Keeling) Islands. This species is found mainly on coral reefs where it grazes on algae of the genus Caulerpa.
