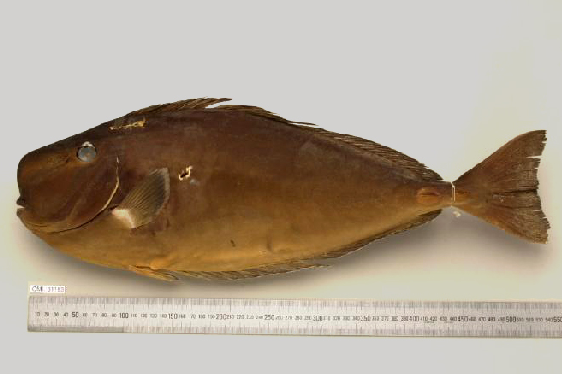

Conservation status
- Least Concern (IUCN 3.1)

Scientific classification
- Kingdom: Animalia
- Phylum: Chordata
- Class: Actinopterygii
- Order: Acanthuriformes
- Family: Acanthuridae
- Genus: Naso
- Species: N. mcdadei

Binomial name
- Naso mcdadei J. W. Johnson, 2002

= Squarenose unicornfish =

Species of fish

The squarenose unicornfish (Naso mcdadei) is a species of marine ray-finned fish belonging to the family Acanthuridae, the surgeonfishes, unicornfishes and tangs. This species is found in the Indo-Pacific region.

== Taxonomy ==
The squarenose unicornfish was first formally described in 2002 by the Australian ichthyologist Jeffrey W. Johnson of the Queensland Museum with its type locality given as Flat Rock off Stradbroke Island in Queensland. This species is classified within the nominate subgenus of the genus Naso. The genus Naso is the only genus in the subfamily Nasinae in the family Acanthuridae.

== Etymology ==
The squarenose unicornfish has a specific name which honours Michael McDade, a spearfisher and the records officer for the Australian Underwater Federation. McDade collected and donated many specimens of rare fishes to the Queensland Museum, one of which was the type of this species.

== Description ==
The squarenose unicornfish has its dorsal fin supported by 5 spines and between 28 and 31 soft rays while the anal fin has 2 spines and 26 to 29 soft rays supporting it. There are between 50 and 70 teeth in each jaw, these teeth have serrated edges, the number of teeth increases with age. Its body has a standard length which is about 2.4 to 3 times its depth with a rounded dorsal profile. In adults, there is a square protuberance on the forehead. The caudal peduncle has a pair of bony plates on each side, each bearing a forward pointing spine. The caudal fin is truncate in mature fish but emarginate in juveniles. The overall colour is bluish-grey to olive-grey, lighter on the lower body. The dorsal fin has a thin pale margin as does the caudal fin which also has a black subterminal band. This species has a maximum published total length of 75 cm (30 in).

== Distribution and habitat ==
The squarenose unicornfish is found in the Indo-Pacific region. It occurs along the east African coast from Mozambique to KwaZulu Natal, around Madagascar, Mauritius, the Chagos Archipelago, the Maldives, east through Indonesia into the Western Pacific north to Taiwan and south to Australia. In Australia it has been recorded from the Dampier Archipelago in Western Australia, Ashmore Reef in the Timor Sea, from Cape Grenville to Stradbroke Island in Queensland. It can be found on the steep drop off of coral reefs or around outcrops of rock and it is a typical species of habitats away from reef areas.
