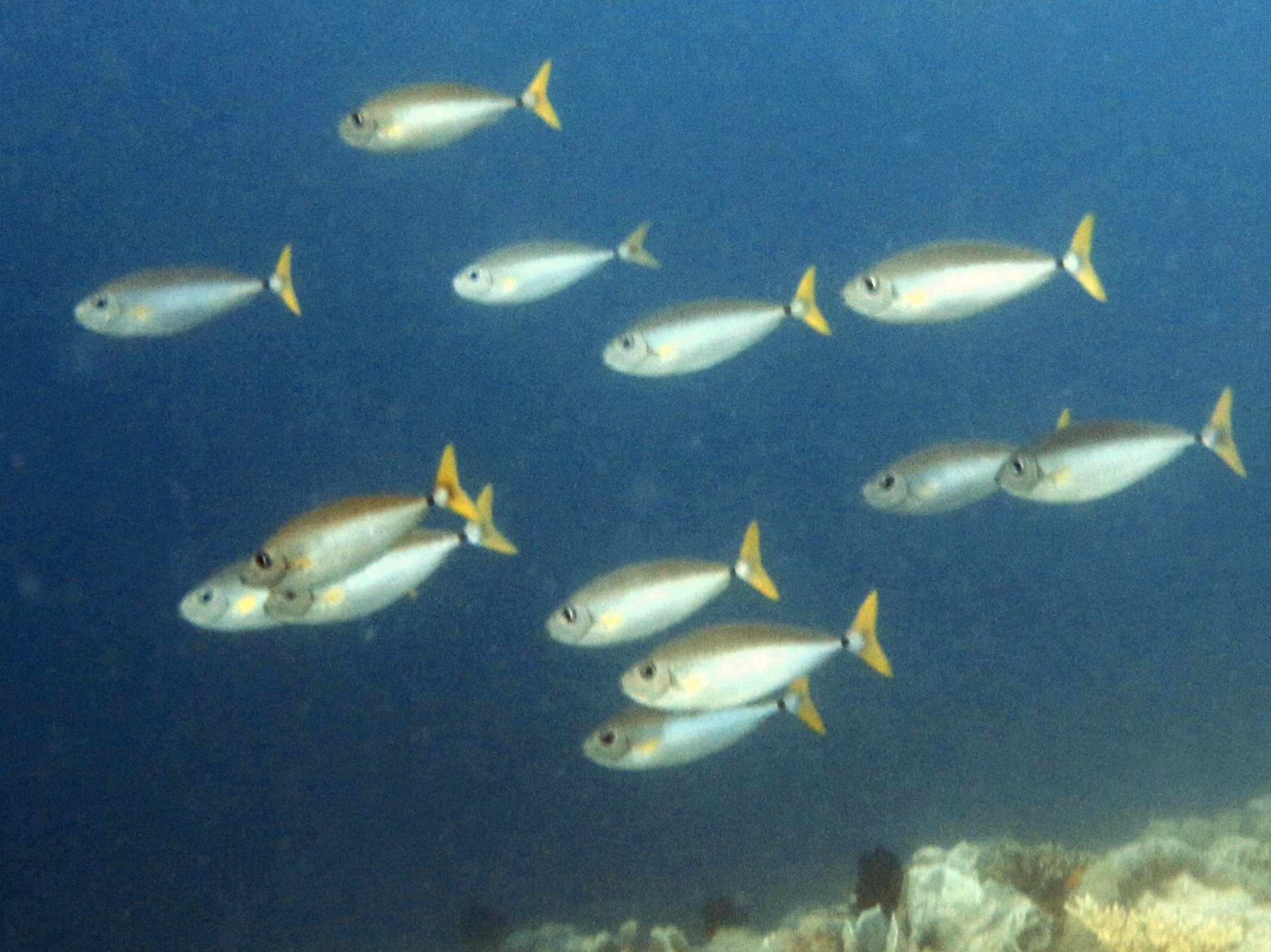

Conservation status
- Least Concern (IUCN 3.1)

Scientific classification
- Kingdom: Animalia
- Phylum: Chordata
- Class: Actinopterygii
- Order: Acanthuriformes
- Family: Acanthuridae
- Genus: Naso
- Subgenus: Axinurus
- Species: N. minor

Binomial name
- Naso minor (J. L. B. Smith, 1966)

Synonyms
- Axinurus minor J. L. B. Smith, 1966; Naso unicolor Günther, 1861

= Naso minor =

Species of fish

Naso minor, the blackspine unicornfish, slender unicornfish, lesser unicornfish or pony unicornfish, is a species of marine ray-finned fish belonging to the family Acanthuridae, the surgeonfishes, unicornfishes and tangs. This species is found in the Indo-Pacific region.

== Taxonomy ==
Naso minor was first formally described in 1966 by the South African ichthyologist James Leonard Brierley Smith with its type locality given as Pinda Reef in Mozambique. This species is classified in the subgenus Axinurus within the genus Naso. The genus Naso is the only genus in the subfamily Nasinae in the family Acanthuridae.

== Etymology ==
Naso minor is the smallest species in the genus Naso hence the specific name minor.

== Description ==
Naso minor has its dorsal fin supported by 5 spines and 27 to 29 soft rays while the anal fin is supported by 2 spines and between 27 and 29 soft rays. This is a relatively slender unicornfish with the standard length being around three times the body's depth. The head does not have any form of protuberance and is smoothly rounded. There is a short, diagonal groove in front of the eye and below the nostrils. There is a single bony plate on each side of the caudal peduncle and this has a large keel and a forward pointing spine. The overall colour is grey fading to white on the underside with a purplish-grey head. It can show 5 or 6 bluish grey horizontal stripes along the flanks. The lips are blackish, there is an area of lighter colour underneath the pectoral fins, the bony plates and the caudal peduncle are black and the caudal fin is yellow. When courting the males have a black upper body and a white stripe along the flanks. This species has a maximum published standard length of 30 cm (12 in).

== Distribution and habitat ==
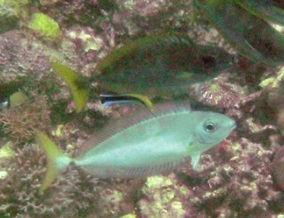
In Romblon, Philippines

Naso minor has a wide but somewhat localised distribution in the Indian Ocean but is slightly less scattered in the western Pacific Ocean. It has been recorded from Mozambique, Mauritius and Reunion in the western Indian Ocean. In the Western Pacific Ocean it has been recorded from eastern Indonesia and the Philippines north to Taiwan, south to Australia and east to Guam. In Australia it is found from the northern Great Barrier Reef south to the waters off Cairns. The slender unicornfish is found from coastal reefs to the outer reef slopes, typically swimming around the upper edges of drop-offs in small groups.

== Biology ==
Naso minor feeds on zooplankton in the water column at depths between 8 and 40 m (26 and 131 ft) and close to reefs. They will move onto reefs to be cleaned by the bluestreak cleaner wrasse (Labroides dimidiatus). The males can rapidly change their colour and pattern when courting females.
