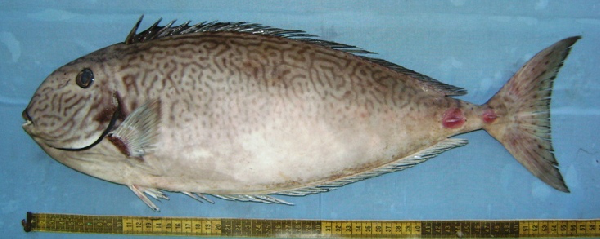

Conservation status
- Data Deficient (IUCN 3.1)

Scientific classification
- Kingdom: Animalia
- Phylum: Chordata
- Class: Actinopterygii
- Order: Acanthuriformes
- Family: Acanthuridae
- Genus: Naso
- Subgenus: Naso
- Species: N. reticulatus

Binomial name
- Naso reticulatus J. E. Randall, 2001

= Reticulate unicornfish =

Species of fish

The reticulate unicornfishes (Naso reticulatus) is a species of marine ray-finned fish belonging to the family Acanthuridae, the surgeonfishes, unicornfishes and tangs. It is a rare species found on coral reefs in the Indo-West Pacific region.

== Taxonomy ==
The reticulate unicornfish was first formally described in 2001 by the American ichthyologist John Ernest Randall with its type locality given as the "Southern end at Nanwan, middle of bay directly east of fishing boat harbor at Houpihu, Taiwan, depth 15 meters". This species is classified within the nominate subgenus of the genus Naso. The genus Naso is the only genus in the subfamily Nasinae in the family Acanthuridae.

== Etymology ==
The reticulate unicornfish has the specific name reticulatus, which means "net like", an allusion to the net like pattern of lines on the body.

== Description ==
The reticulate unicornfish has its dorsal fin supported by 5 spines and 29 soft rays while the anal fin is supported by 2 spines and 27 soft rays. There is no protuberance on the forehead. The head has a slightly convex profile with a small bump in front of the eyes. It has a body which has a depth that fits into its standard length over 3 times. The caudal peduncle has two bony plates on each side and these have small keels. The body is pale-brown to olive brown on the upper body and white on the belly. The upper 60% of the body is marked with a pattern of small black spots and a network of dark lines. This species has a maximum published standard length of 49 cm (19 in).

== Distribution and habitat ==
The reticulate unicornfish is found in the Indian and Pacific Oceans. It has been found off India, Pakistan, China, Taiwan, Philippines and Indonesia, as well as in the Dampier Archipelago off Western Australia. It is an uncommon species of coral reefs frequently found near drop offs.
