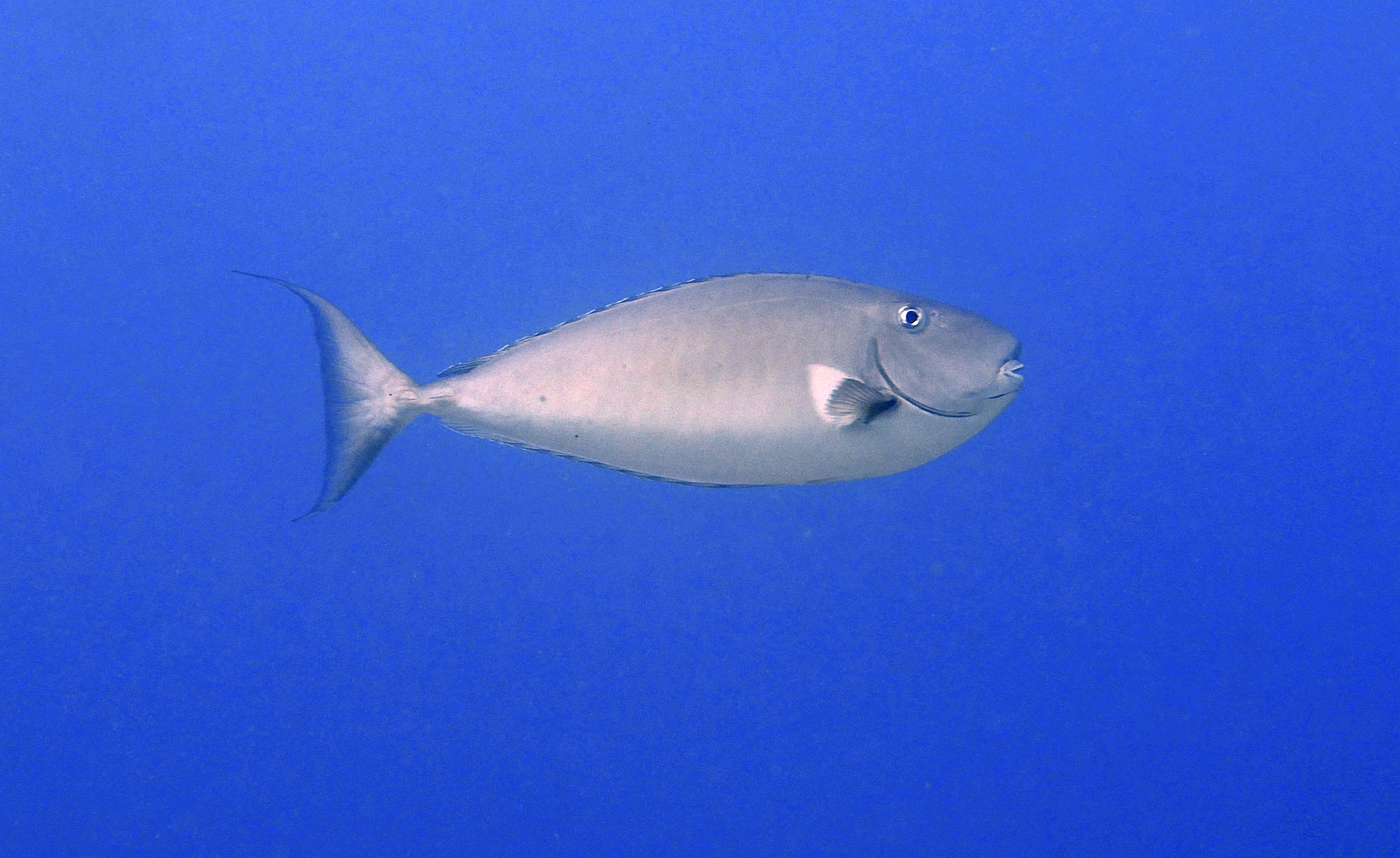
- In Indonesia

Conservation status
- Least Concern (IUCN 3.1)

Scientific classification
- Kingdom: Animalia
- Phylum: Chordata
- Class: Actinopterygii
- Order: Acanthuriformes
- Family: Acanthuridae
- Genus: Naso
- Species: N. fageni

Binomial name
- Naso fageni Morrow, 1954

Synonyms
- Cyphomycter fageni (Morrow, 1954); Cyphomycter cavallo J. L. B. Smith, 1955; Rhinodactylus baixopindae J. L. B. Smith, 1957

= Naso fageni =

Species of fish

Naso fageni, the horseface unicornfish or blunt unicornfish, is a species of marine ray-finned fish belonging to the family Acanthuridae, the surgeonfishes, unicornfishes and tangs. This fish is found in the Indo-Pacific region.

== Taxonomy ==
Naso fageni was first formally described in 1954 by the American ichthyologist James Edwin Morrow with its type locality given as Bugsuk Island in the Philippines.

This species is classified within the nominate subgenus of the genus Naso.

== Etymology ==
Naso fageni has a specific name which honours Morrow's friend and guide on several expeditions to study fishes Captain R.W. Fagen of Miami.

== Distribution and habitat ==
Naso fageni has a disjunct distribution in the Indo-West Pacific region. In the western Indian Ocean the horseface unicornfish occurs along the eastern coast of Africa from the Gulf of Aden to central Mozambique, the Comoros Islands, Aldabra and the Saya de Malha Bank. In the central Indian Ocean it has been recorded in the Chagos Islands. The eastern Population is found in the off southern Japan, Philippines, Indonesia and Western Australia.

It is an uncommon species found solitarily or in small schools in deeper non reef environments with juveniles found in rock and coral reefs.

== Description ==
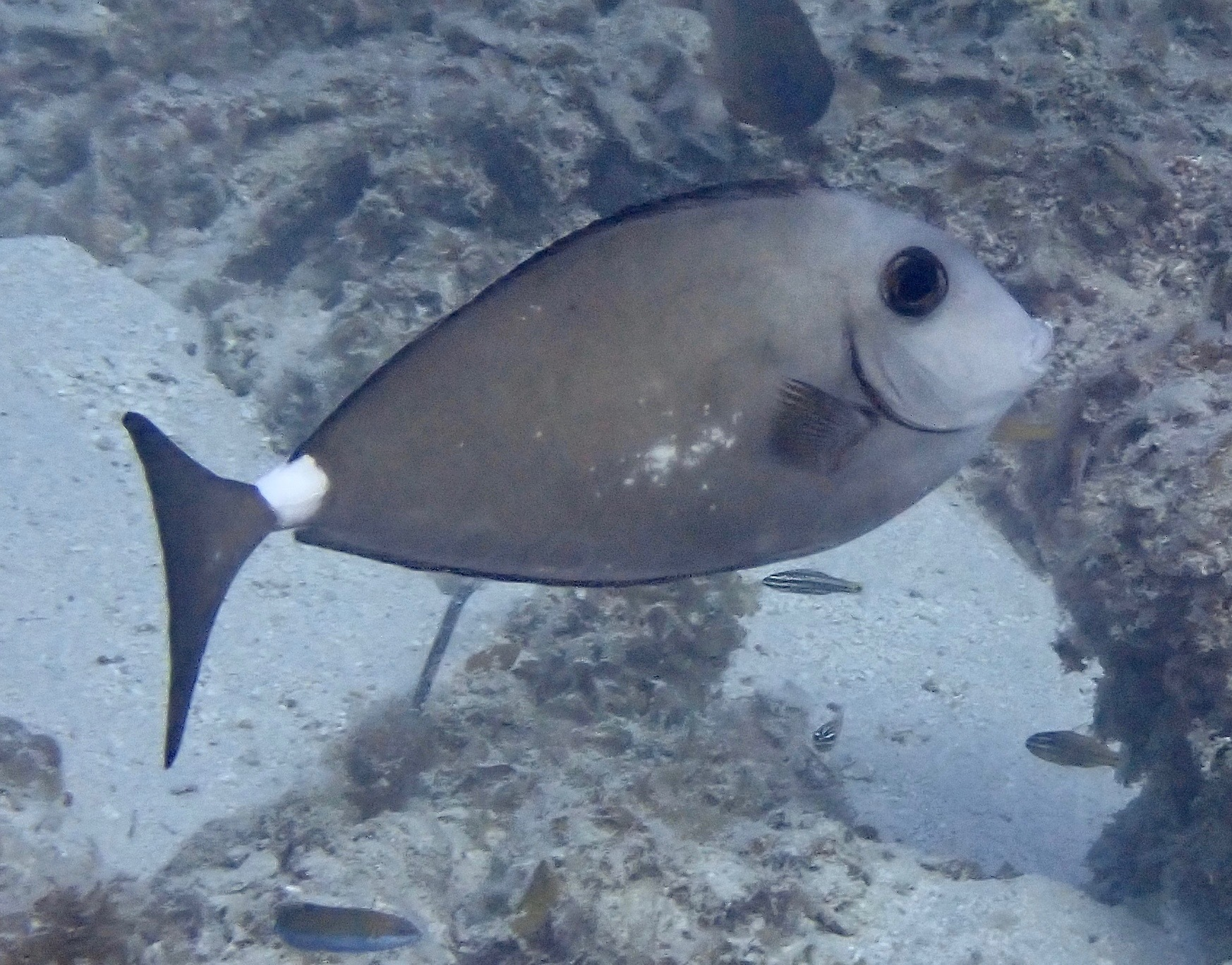
Juvenile, in Western Australia

Naso fageni has 5 spines and between 24 and 26 soft rays supporting the dorsal fin while the anal fin is supported by 2 spines and between 23 and 25 soft rays. The pectoral fin contains 17 fin rays. The body has a depth which is equivalent to between roughly a half to a third of the standard length and it grows more elongate as the fish grows. The horseface unicornfish has an oval, laterally compressed body and in the largest specimens there is a short bony protuberance above the mouth. There are two, non-mobile bony plates on each side of the caudal peduncle and the caudal fin is lunate. There are long filaments growing from the tips of the lobes of the caudal fins in larger specimens, and the possession of these may be limited to males.

The overall colour is pale grey to greyish brown with the adults being marked with small dark sopots on their bodies and the juveniles having a white band between the bony plates on the caudal peduncle. This species has a maximum fork length of 80 cm (31 in).
