= Naso maculatus =

- At the Oklahoma Aquarium

Conservation status
- Least Concern (IUCN 3.1)

Scientific classification
- Kingdom: Animalia
- Phylum: Chordata
- Class: Actinopterygii
- Division: Teleostei
- Order: Acanthuriformes
- Family: Acanthuridae
- Genus: Naso
- Subgenus: Naso
- Species: N. maculatus

Binomial name
- Naso maculatus J. E. Randall & Struhsaker, 1981

Species of fish

Naso maculatus, the scribbled unicornfish or spotted unicornfish (leading to confusion with Naso brevirostris), is a species of marine ray-finned fish belonging to the family Acanthuridae, the surgeonfishes, unicornfishes and tangs. This fish is found in the western Pacific Ocean.

== Taxonomy ==
Naso maculatus was first formally described in 1981 by the American ichthyologists John Ernest Randall and Paul J. Struhsaker with its type locality given as the northern shore off Haliewa on Oahu in Hawaii. This species is classified within the nominate subgenus of the genus Naso. The genus Naso is the only genus in the subfamily Nasinae in the family Acanthuridae.

== Etymology ==
Naso maculatus has the specific name maculatus, which means "spotted" and is a reference to the many dark spots on both adults and juvenile fish.

== Description ==
Naso maculatus is a slender bodied unicornfish which has no protuberance growing from the head at any size. The dorsal fin is supported by 6 or 7 spines and between 26 and 28 soft rays while the anal fin has 2 spines and 26 to 28 soft rays supporting it. There are two small bony plates on the caudal peduncle each with a roughly semi-circular keel which projects outwards. The caudal fin is emarginate and there are no filaments growing from the tips of the fin lobes. The overall colour is bluish grey, paler on the lower body with the upper three-quarters of the body covered with a numerous dark spots and lines, with similar but less distinct markings on the head. The lateral line is marked out by a dark line that breaks into spots towards the caudal peduncle. This species reaches a maximum published total length of 45 cm (18 in).

== Distribution and habitat ==
Naso maculatus has an anti-tropical distribution in the Western Pacific Ocean. It is found in the Wakayama Prefecture in Japan and the Hawaiian Islands in the north. The southern distribution includes New Caledonia and islands off Australia. In Australia it has been recorded from the Capricorn Group off southern Queensland, Lord Howe Island and Middleton Reef. This species is found in deep water at depths between 20 and 220 m (66 and 722 ft) on the seaward slopes of reefs.
