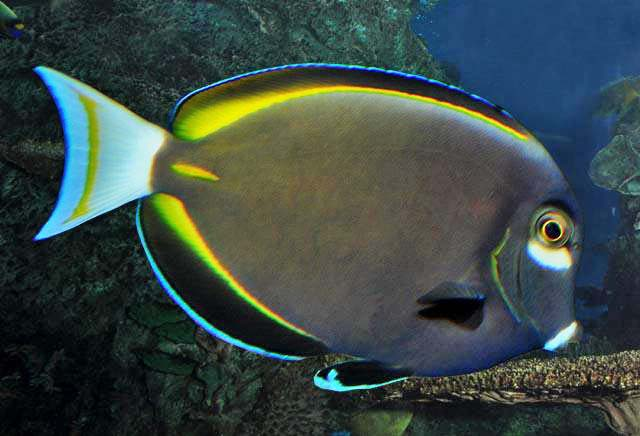

Conservation status
- Least Concern (IUCN 3.1)

Scientific classification
- Kingdom: Animalia
- Phylum: Chordata
- Class: Actinopterygii
- Division: Teleostei
- Order: Acanthuriformes
- Family: Acanthuridae
- Genus: Acanthurus
- Species: A. nigricans

Binomial name
- Acanthurus nigricans (Linnaeus, 1758)

Synonyms
- Chaetodon nigricans Linnaeus, 1758; Acanthurus glaucopareius Cuvier, 1829; Acanthurus aliala Lesson, 1831

= Acanthurus nigricans =

Species of fish

Acanthurus nigricans, the goldrim surgeonfish, velvet surgeon, whitecheek surgeonfish, yellow-banded surgeonfish or yellowrimmed surgeonfish, is a species of marine ray-finned fish belonging to the family Acanthuridae, the surgeonfishes, unicornfishes and tangs. This species is found from the central Indo-Pacific area to the eastern Pacific coast, Hawaii included.

== Taxonomy ==
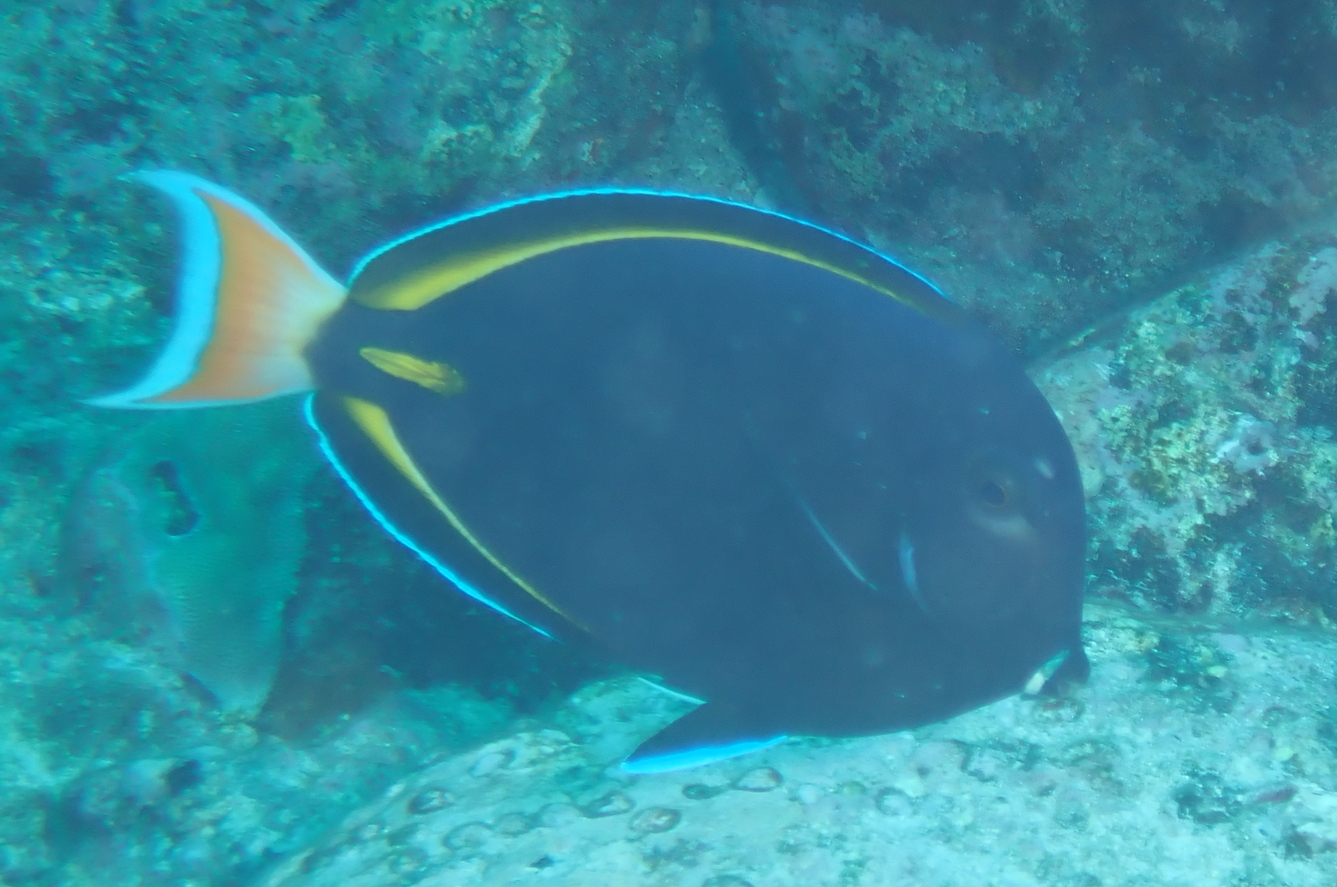
Hybrid (A. achilles × nigricans)

Acanthurus nigricans was first formally described by Linnaeus in the 10th edition of the Systema Naturae published in 1758 with the type locality given as the Red Sea but it is actually thought to be Indonesia.

This species forms a species complex with three other species in the genus Acanthurus, A. achilles, A. japonicus and A. leucosternon, these three all having parapatric distributions in respect to each other but all within the range of A. nigricans which frequently hybridises with the other three species.

The genus Acanthurus is one of two genera in the tribe Acanthurini which is one of three tribes in the subfamily Acanthurinae which is one of two subfamilies in the family Acanthuridae.

== Etymology ==
Acanthurus nigricans has the specific name nigricans which means "swarthy" or "blackish", a reference to the bluish-black colour of this fish's body.

== Description ==
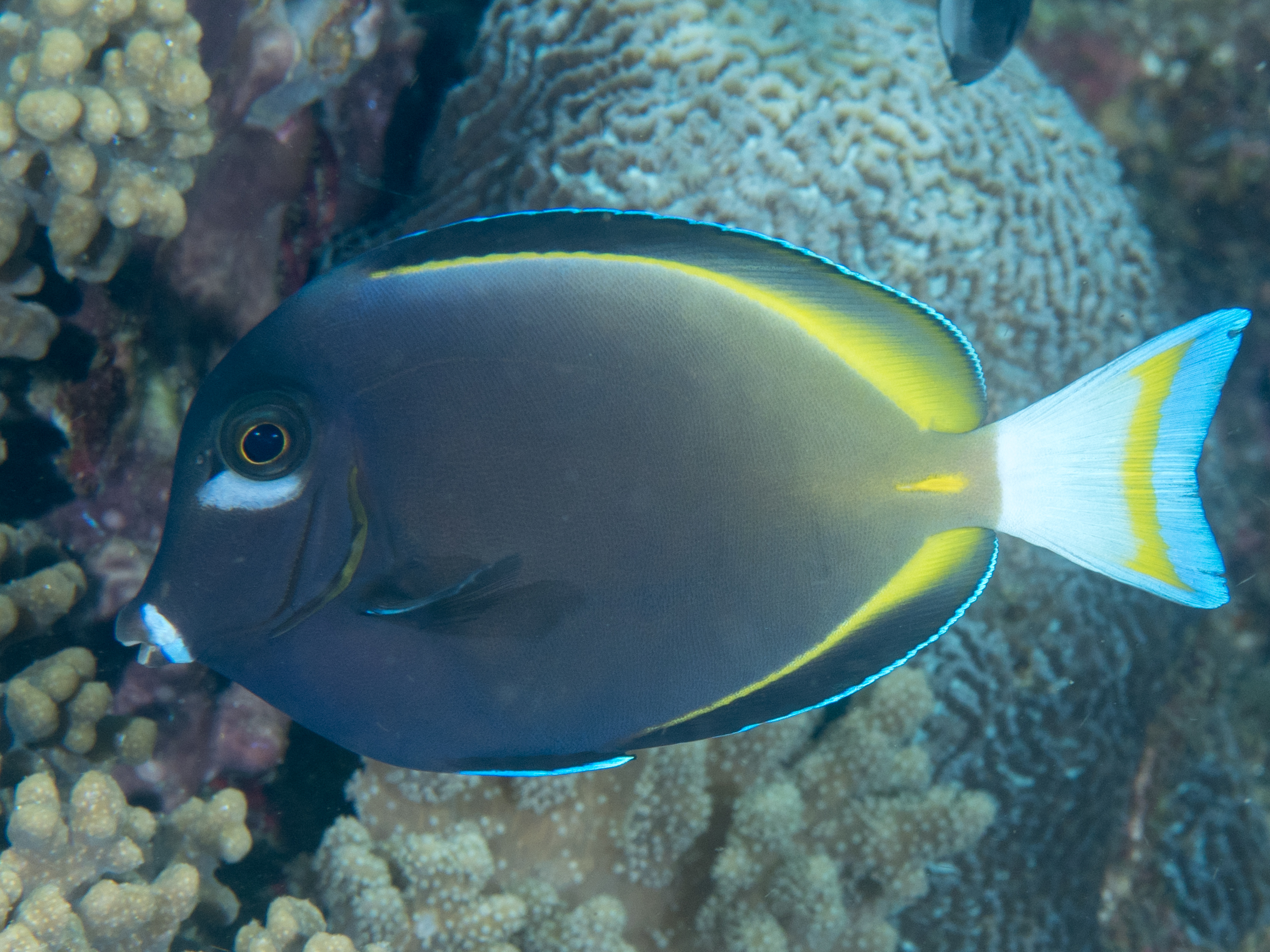
In Indonesia

Acanthurus nigricans has a body which is shaped like an elongated oval, with a steep dorsal profile to the head and an eye positioned high on the head. It has a small protrusible mouth with between 8 and 28 small teeth on the jaws which have flattened, notched tips. The dorsal fin is supported by 9 spines and between 28 and 31 soft rays while the anal fin contains 3 spines and 26 to 28 soft rays.

The overall colour is bluish-black or black broken by a large patch of white below the eye. There is a yellow band at the base of both the dorsal and anal fins and this widens as it approaches the caudal fin. The caudal peduncle has a patch of yellow around the spine and its sheath. The caudal fin is white with a slender yellow submarginal band.

This species has a maximum published fork length of 36 cm (14 in).

== Distribution and habitat ==
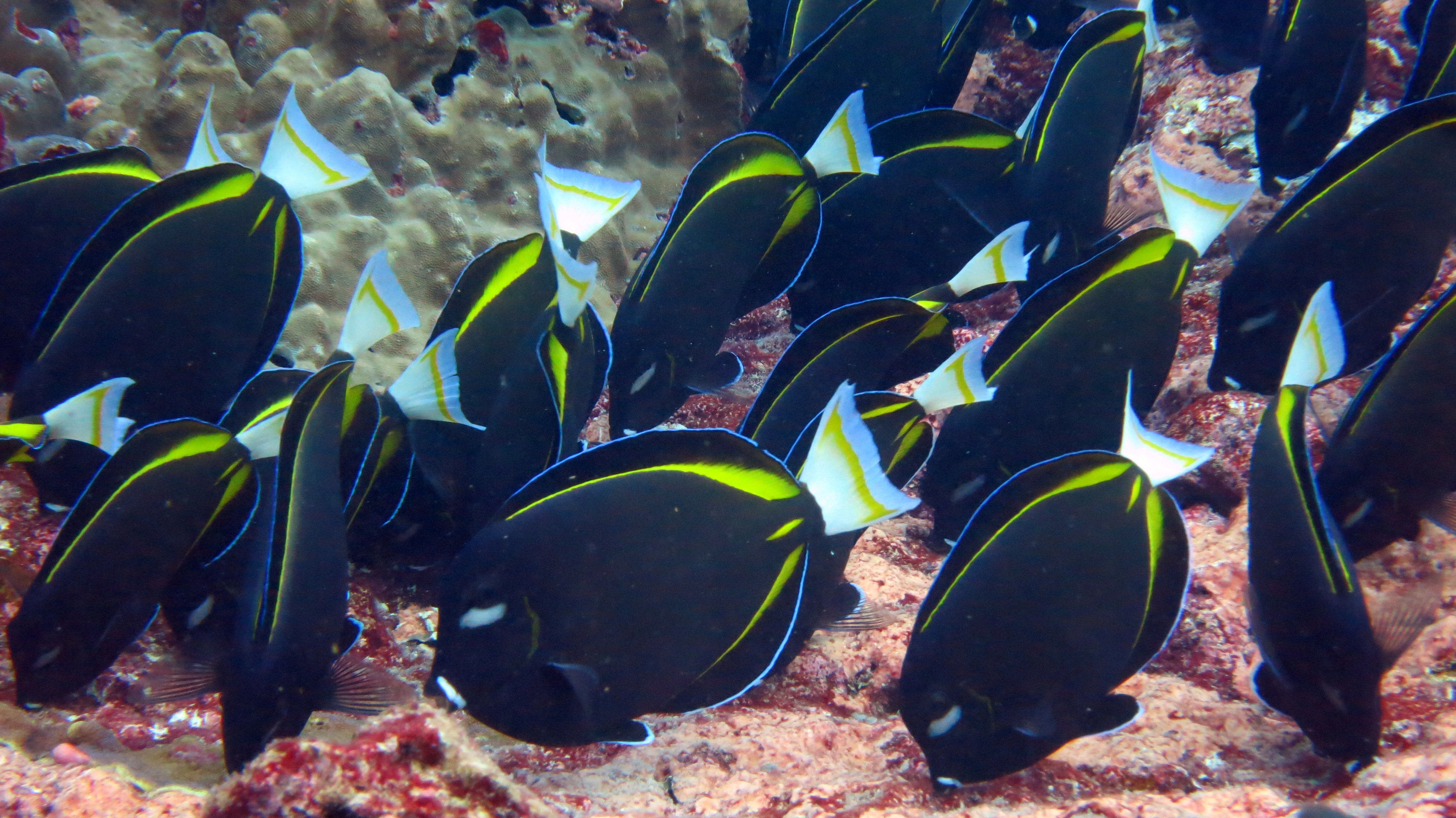
At Jarvis Island

Acanthrus nigricans is found as far east as the Chagos Islands in the British Indian Ocean Territory in the central Indian Ocean, Christmas Island and the Cocos (Keeling) Islands in the eastern Indian Ocean. In the Pacific Ocean it is more widespread and is found from the Ryukyu Islands of southern Japan south to the Great Barrier Reef and east across the Pacific to the eastern coasts of Central and South American between the Gulf of California and Ecuador.

It is a benthopelagic fish with the adults being found at depths from the surface down to 67 m (220 ft) over hard substrates in clear waters in lagoons and over seaward reefs. The juveniles hide among large corals.
