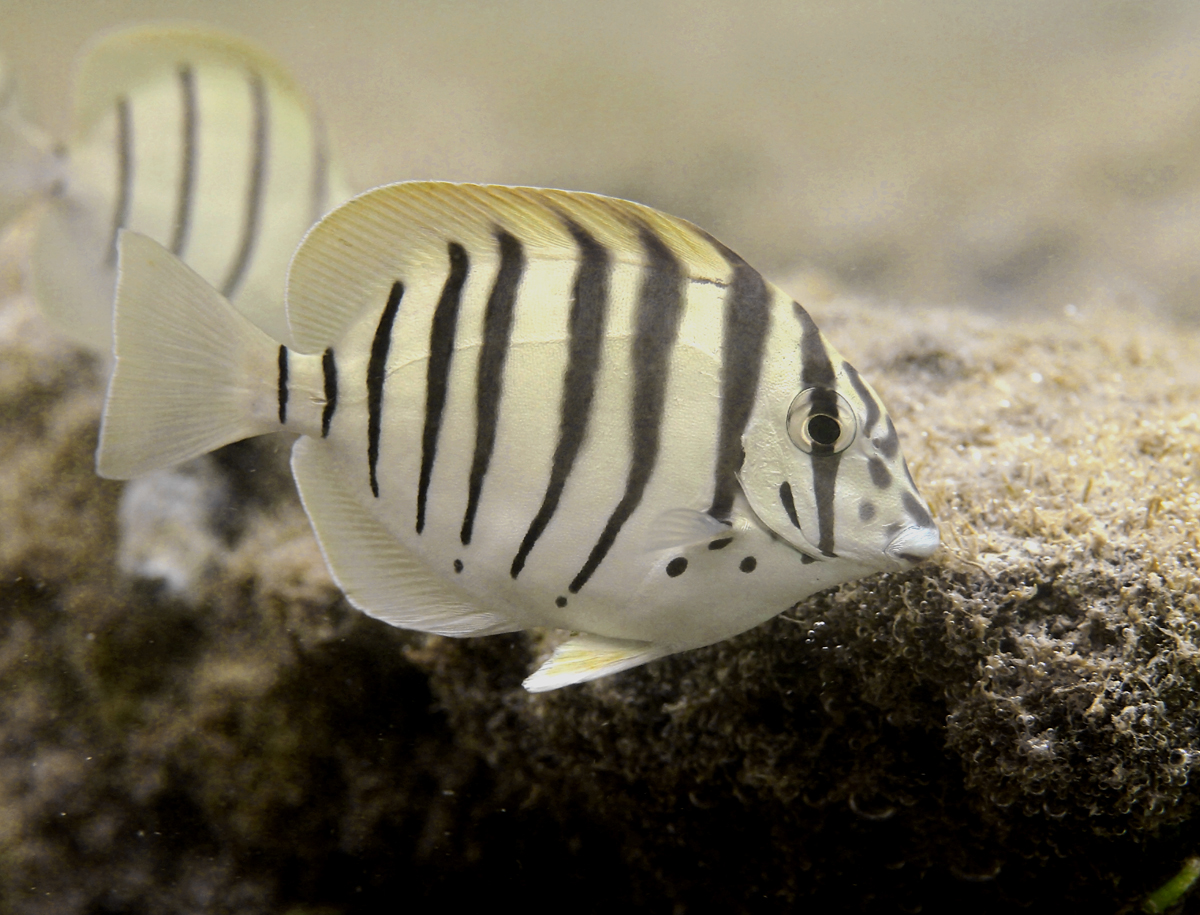

Conservation status
- Data Deficient (IUCN 3.1)

Scientific classification
- Kingdom: Animalia
- Phylum: Chordata
- Class: Actinopterygii
- Division: Teleostei
- Order: Acanthuriformes
- Family: Acanthuridae
- Genus: Acanthurus
- Species: A. polyzona

Binomial name
- Acanthurus polyzona (Bleeker, 1868)

Synonyms
- Acanthurus triostegus polyzona (Bleeker, 1868); Rhombotides polyzona Bleeker, 1868

= Acanthurus polyzona =

Species of fish

Acanthurus polyzona, commonly known as the black-barred surgeonfish or zebra tang, is a tropical fish found in coral reefs in the western Indian Ocean. It was first described in 1868 by the Dutch ichthyologist Pieter Bleeker, who gave it the name Rhombotides polyzona; it was later transferred to the genus Acanthurus, becoming Acanthurus polyzona.

== Distribution ==
Acanthurus polyzona has a rather restricted distribution in the tropical western Indian Ocean, its range including Madagascar, Mauritius, Réunion and the Comoro Islands. It lives in shallow reef habitats, in lagoons and on outer reef slopes, over sandy, rocky or coral seabeds at depths down to about 15 m (50 ft).

== Description ==
At Réunion

Acanthurus polyzona is a laterally flattened fish, roughly the shape of an almond, and can grow to a length of about 20 cm (8 in). The head is short with a pointed snout and a terminal mouth with thick lips. The eyes are large and the two pairs of nostrils are immediately in front of the eyes. The overall colour of this fish is a very pale yellow, rather more olive-grey dorsally and more silvery-white ventrally. Superimposed on this pale background are nine broad black bands, narrowing slightly towards the belly; the first band passes through the eye, the second extends from the front of the dorsal fin to the base of the pectoral fins, and the eight and ninth bands are on the caudal peduncle. On either side of the peduncle is a small, retractable spine.

The only fish with which it is likely to be confused is the "convict tang" (Acanthurus triostegus); that species has a yellower background colour and just six vertical, rather more slender black bands. It is more widely distributed, and even within the zebra tang's restricted range, the convict tang is the common of the two.

== Ecology ==
The zebra tang is diurnal and feeds on algae, especially filamentous algae. It often associates with shoals of convict tangs, taking advantage of the protection given by numbers. The juveniles, which are similar to the adults in markings but rather more elongated, associate with young convict tangs. The reproduction of this fish has not been studied, however the growth rate of young fish is fast so that there may be a doubling of a population in as little as 15 months.
