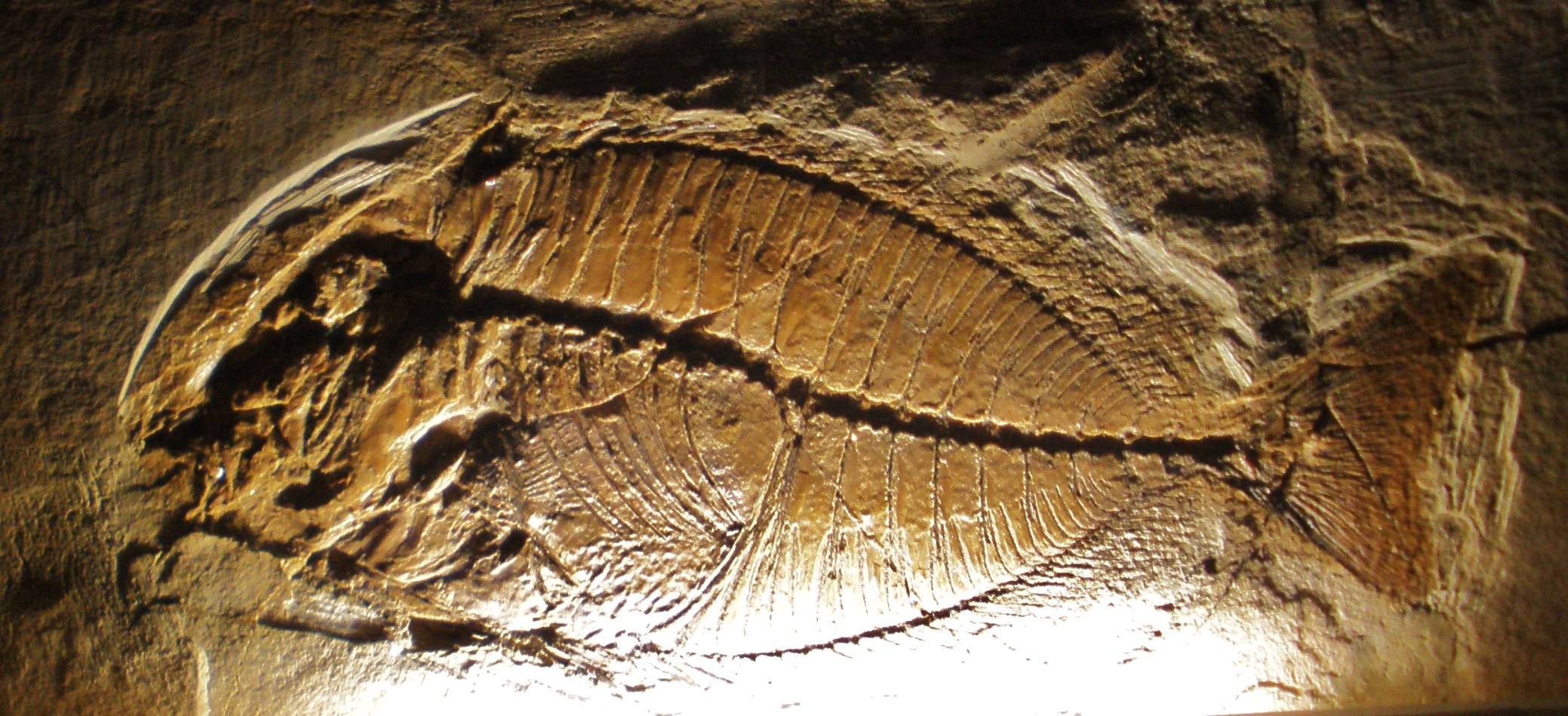
- Fossil of T. nuchalis

Scientific classification
- Domain: Eukaryota
- Kingdom: Animalia
- Phylum: Chordata
- Class: Actinopterygii
- Order: Acanthuriformes
- Family: Acanthuridae
- Genus: †Tylerichthys; Blot, 1981

Species
- T. nuchalis (Agassiz 1834); T. milani Blot 1980

= Tylerichthys =

Tylerichthys Temporal range: Lutetian

Extinct genus of fishes

Tylerichthys is an extinct genus of prehistoric surgeonfish that lived in a coral reef during the Lutetian epoch of what is now Monte Bolca, Italy.

== See also ==
- Prehistoric fish
- List of prehistoric bony fish
