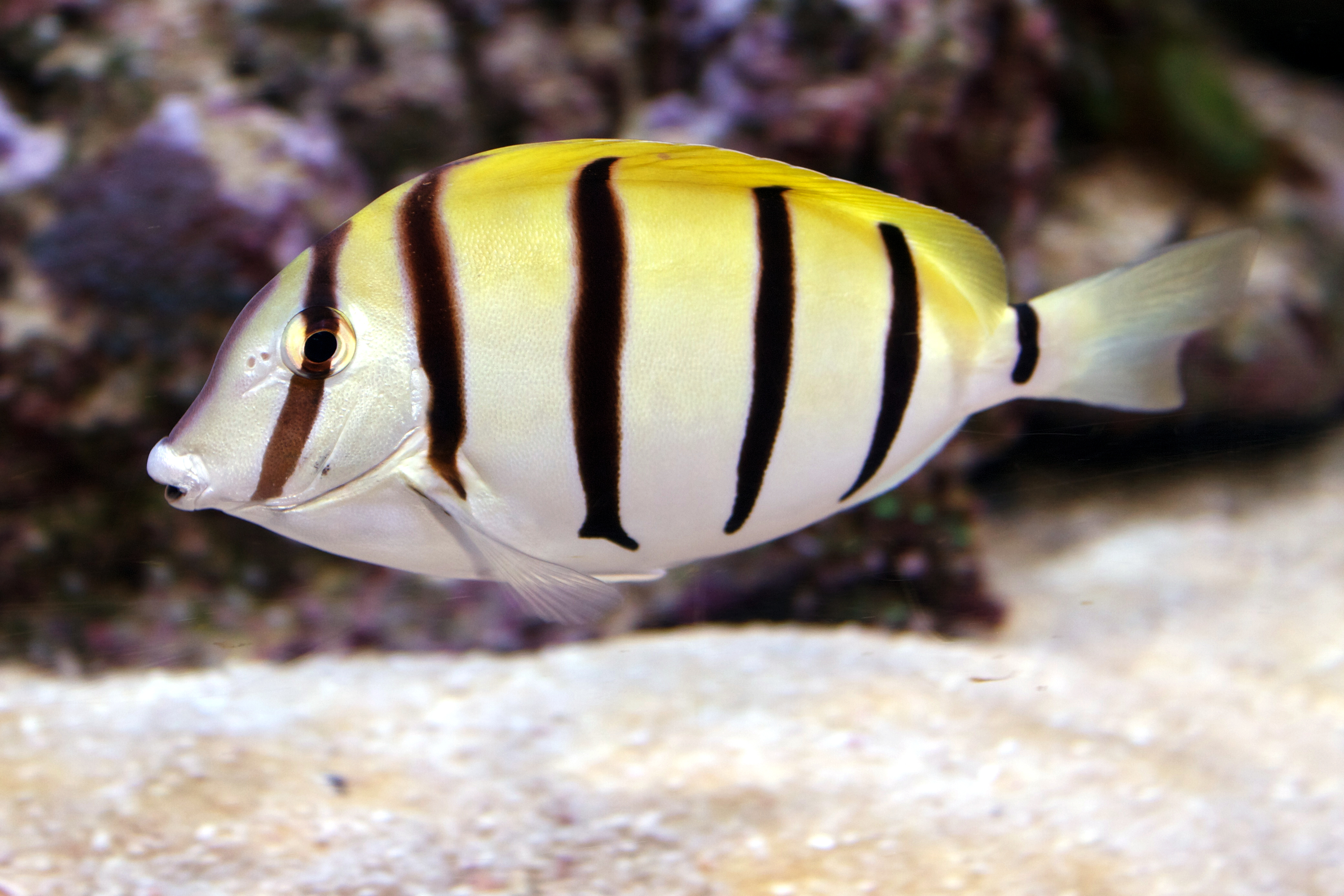

Conservation status
- Least Concern (IUCN 3.1)

Scientific classification
- Kingdom: Animalia
- Phylum: Chordata
- Class: Actinopterygii
- Division: Teleostei
- Order: Acanthuriformes
- Family: Acanthuridae
- Genus: Acanthurus
- Species: A. triostegus

Binomial name
- Acanthurus triostegus (Linnaeus, 1758)

Synonyms
- List: Chaetodon triostegus Linnaeus, 1758; Acanthurus triostegus triostegus (Linnaeus, 1758); Hepatus triostegus (Linnaeus, 1758); Rhombotides triostegus (Linnaeus, 1758); Teuthis triostegus (Linnaeus, 1758); Harpurus fasciatus Forster, 1801; Acanthurus zebra Lacépède, 1802; Chaetodon couaga Lacepède, 1802; Teuthis australis Gray, 1827; Acanthurus hirundo Bennett, 1829; Acanthurus subarmatus Bennett, 1840; Acanthurus pentazona Bleeker, 1850; Rhombotides pentazona (Bleeker, 1850); Acanthurus triostegus sandvicensis Streets, 1877; Hepatus sandvicensis (Streets, 1877); Teuthis sandvicensis (Streets, 1877); Teuthis elegans Garman, 1899; Teuthis troughtoni Whitley, 1928; Acanthurus triostegus marquesensis Schultz & Woods, 1948

= Acanthurus triostegus =

Species of fish

Acanthurus triostegus, commonly known as convict tang, manini, convict surgeonfish, convict surgeon, or fiveband surgeonfish, is a species of marine ray-finned fish belonging to the family Acanthuridae which includes the surgeonfishes, unicornfishes and tangs. This species has a wide Indo-Pacific distribution.

== Taxonomy ==
Acanthurus triostegus was first formally described in 1758 as Chaetodon triostegus by Carl Linnaeus, the description being published in the 10 edition of Systema Naturae with its type locality given as "Indies".

Its closest relative is the zebra tang (A. polyzona), which it is known to hybridize with in Mauritius.

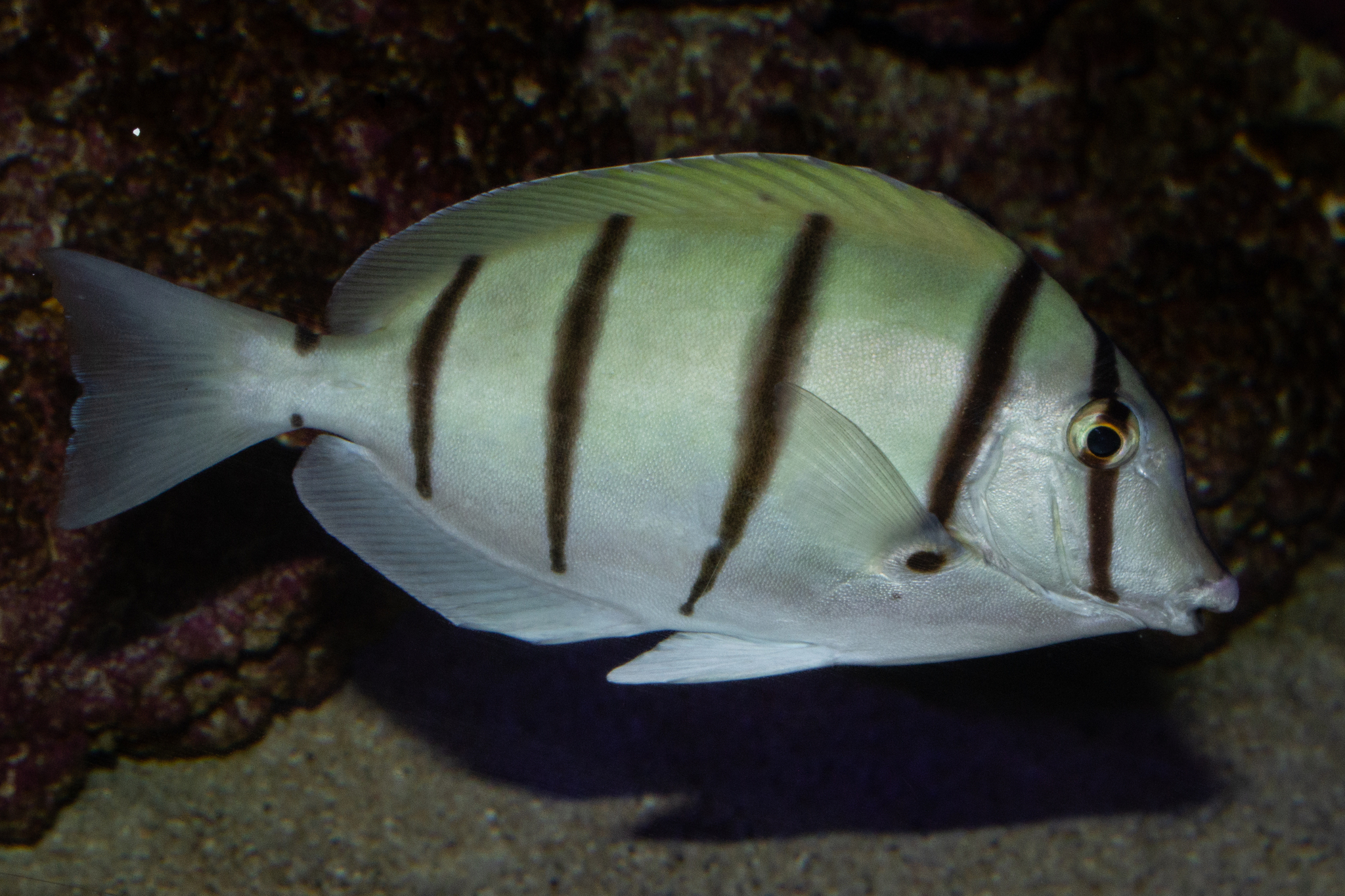
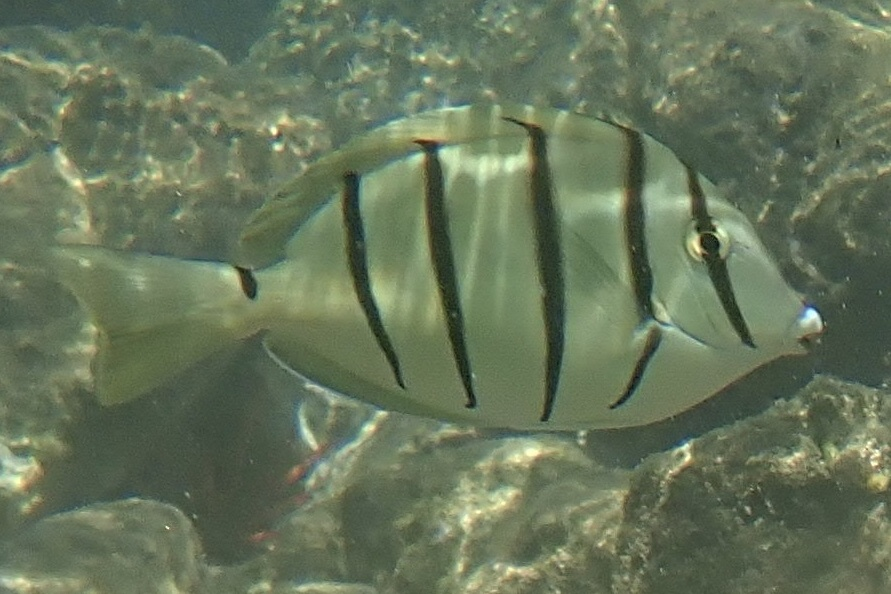
The Hawaiian population (right) can be distinguished by the black bar that extends below the pectoral fin. It is sometimes considered a distinct species (A. sandvicensis) or subspecies (A. t. sandvicensis)

== Etymology ==
Acanthurus triostegus was given the specific name triostegus which means "three covers", this may refer to the three branchiostegal membranes.

== Distribution and habitat ==
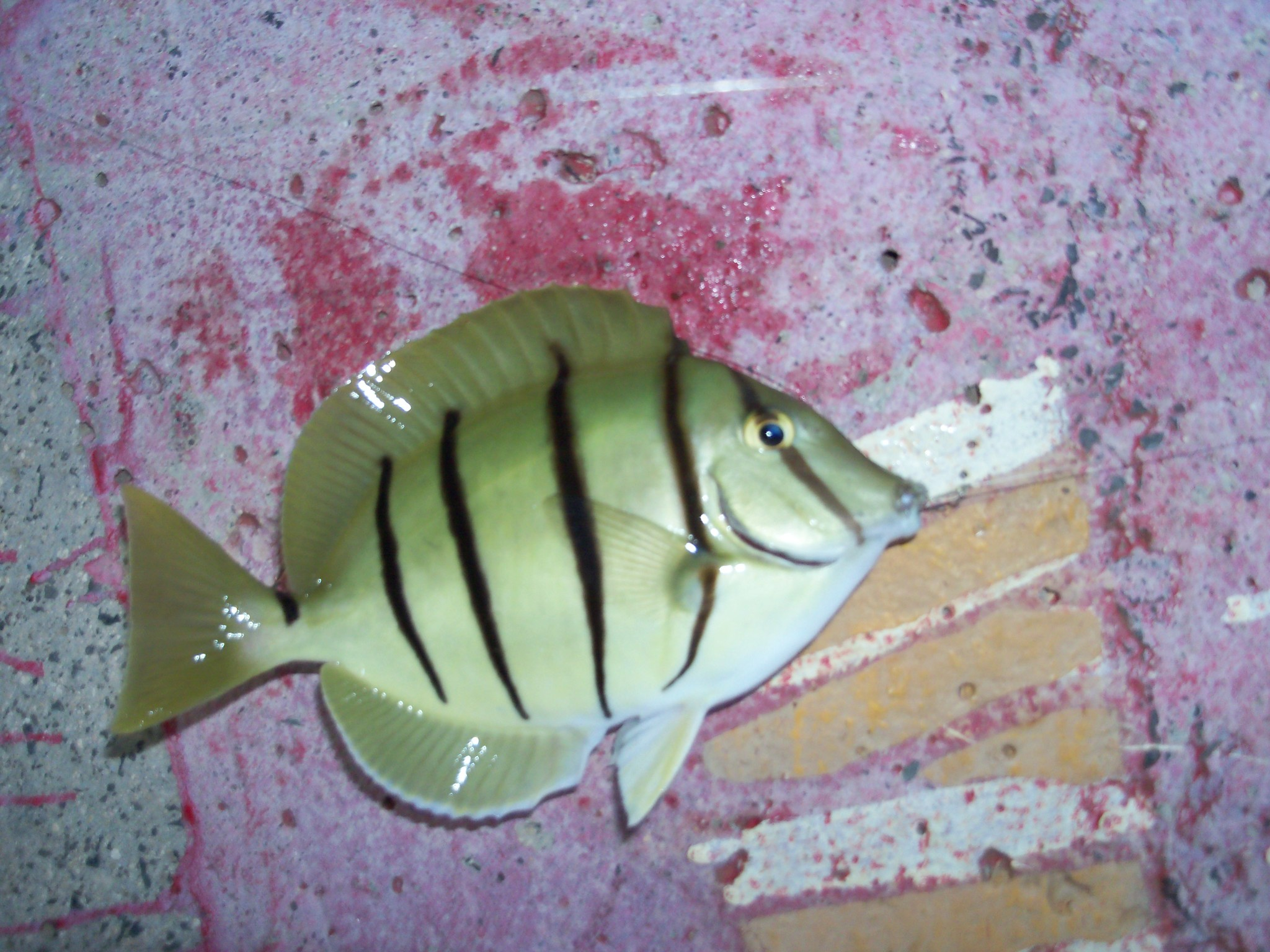
In Hawaii

Acanthurus triostegus occurs in the tropical Indo-Pacific region. Its range extends from the East African coast and Madagascar to southwestern Japan, Australia and Central America, including many Pacific island groups. It is found over hard bottoms in lagoons, reef slopes, bays and estuaries. Juveniles are common in tide pools, and larger fish are found at depths down to about 90 m (300 ft).

== Description ==
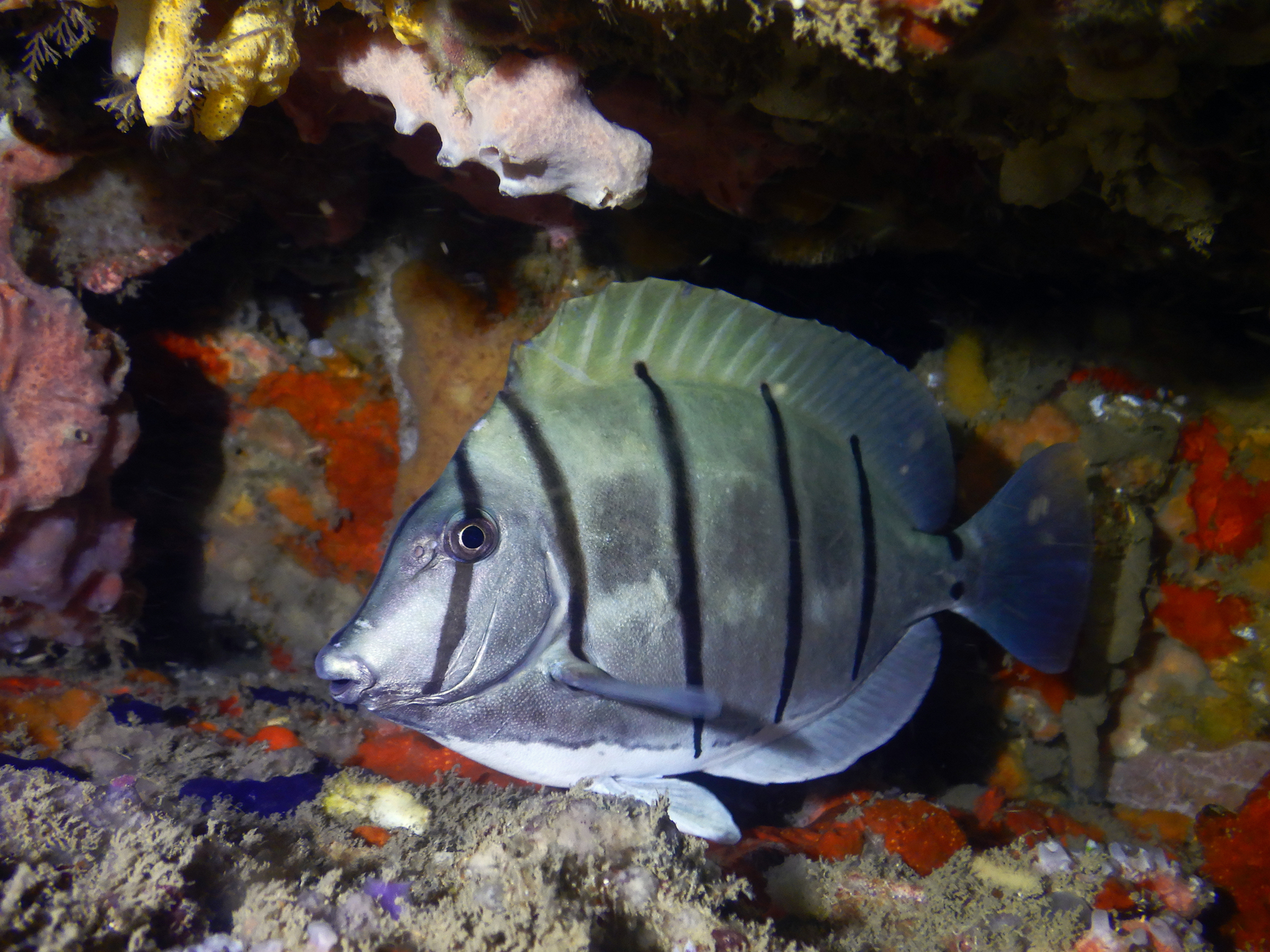
Showing nocturnal colouration, in Kenya

The convict tang is so called because of its bold black stripes on a yellowish background. It is a laterally-compressed oval-shaped fish with a maximum length of about 26–27 cm (10–11 in). The head is small with a pointed snout and a terminal mouth with thick lips. It has six black stripes which distinguishes it from the zebra tang (Acanthurus polyzona) which has nine, and has a more restricted range in the Indian Ocean. The first black stripe is oblique and passes through the eye. There are two black spots on the caudal peduncle, and on each side there is a sharp, retractable spine, which is used in offence or defence.

== Biology ==
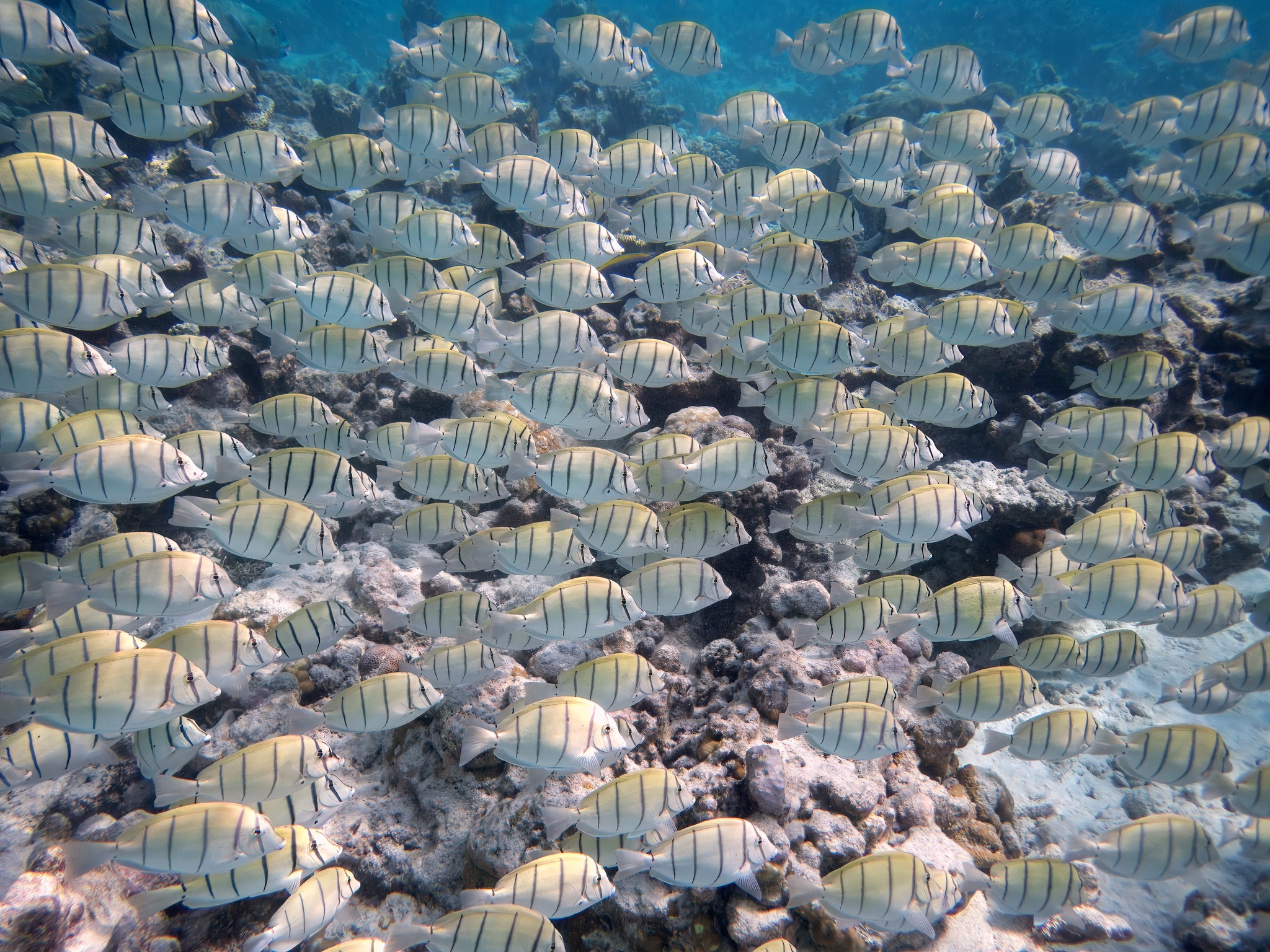
Schooling, in the Maldives

Acanthurus triostegus frequently feed in the vicinity of freshwater discharges, grazing filamentous algae off the rocks. Typically these tangs graze on filamentous algae growing on coral or rocky substrates. The adults aggregate in large schools to feed and these overwhelm damselfishes attempting to defend their territories. The males and females gather in aggegations to spawn.

== Utilisation ==
Acanthurus triostegus is targeted as a food fish in many parts of its range and in some areas is commercially targeted. In Hawaii it is fished for by recreational anglers and it is also caught for the aquarium trade.
