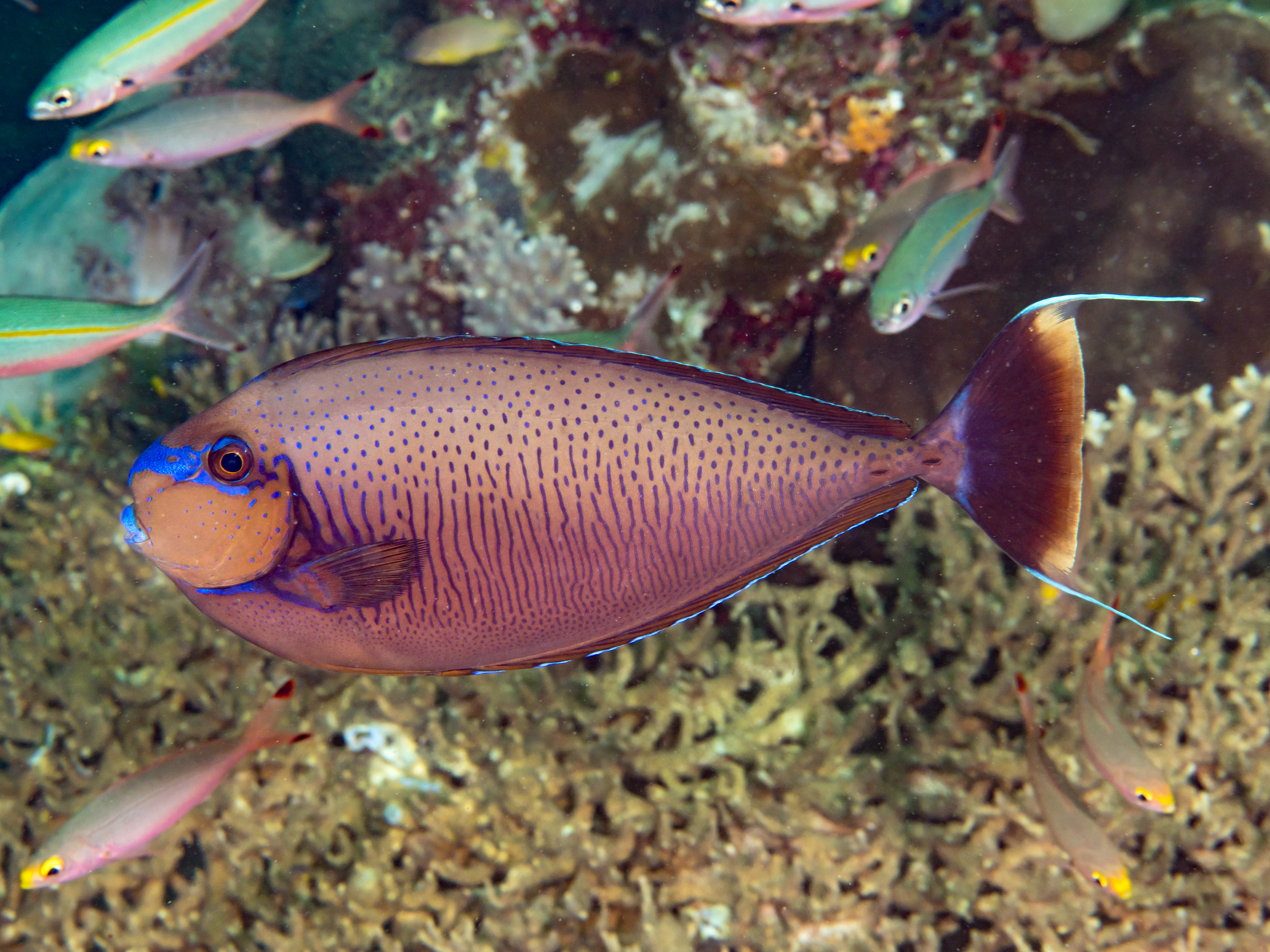
- In Indonesia

Conservation status
- Least Concern (IUCN 3.1)

Scientific classification
- Kingdom: Animalia
- Phylum: Chordata
- Class: Actinopterygii
- Order: Acanthuriformes
- Family: Acanthuridae
- Genus: Naso
- Subgenus: Naso
- Species: N. vlamingii

Binomial name
- Naso vlamingii (Valenciennes, 1835)

Synonyms
- Naseus vlamingii Valenciennes, 1835

= Naso vlamingii =

Species of fish

Naso vlamingii, the bignose unicornfish, scibbled unicornfish, Vlaming's unicornfish, and zebra unicornfish, is a species of marine ray-finned fish belonging to the family Acanthuridae, the surgeonfishes, unicornfishes and tangs. This species is found in the Indo-Pacific.

== Taxonomy ==
Naso vlamingii was first formally described as Naseus vlamingii in 1835 by the French zoologist Achille Valenciennes with its type locality given as Molucca Island in Indonesia. This species is classified within the nominate subgenus of the genus Naso. The genus Naso is the only genus in the subfamily Nasinae in the family Acanthuridae.

== Etymology ==
Naso vlamingii has the specific name which honours the Dutch explorer Admiral Cornelis de Vlamingh who collected specimens and drew illustrations of fishes for the Muséum national d'Histoire naturelle and Valenciennes based his description on one of Vlamingh's illustrations.

== Distribution and habitat ==
Naso vlamingii has a wide Indo-Pacific range which extends from the eastern coast of Africa between Kenya and South Africa, through the Indian Ocean islands, but it is absent the continental southern Asian waters, through the Andaman Sea, Indonesia and into the Pacific. In the Pacific it extends north to southern Japan, east to the Galápagos Islands and south to New Caledonia and Australia. In Australia the species is found at a number of offshore islands and reefs, as well as from the northern Great Barrier Reef south to waters off Sydney in New South Wales and in the waters around Lord Howe Island in the Tasman Sea. The bignose unicornfish is found in deep lagoons and seaward reefs, frequently aggregating in schools that feed on zooplankton around the higher areas of deep slopes and drop-offs.

== Description ==
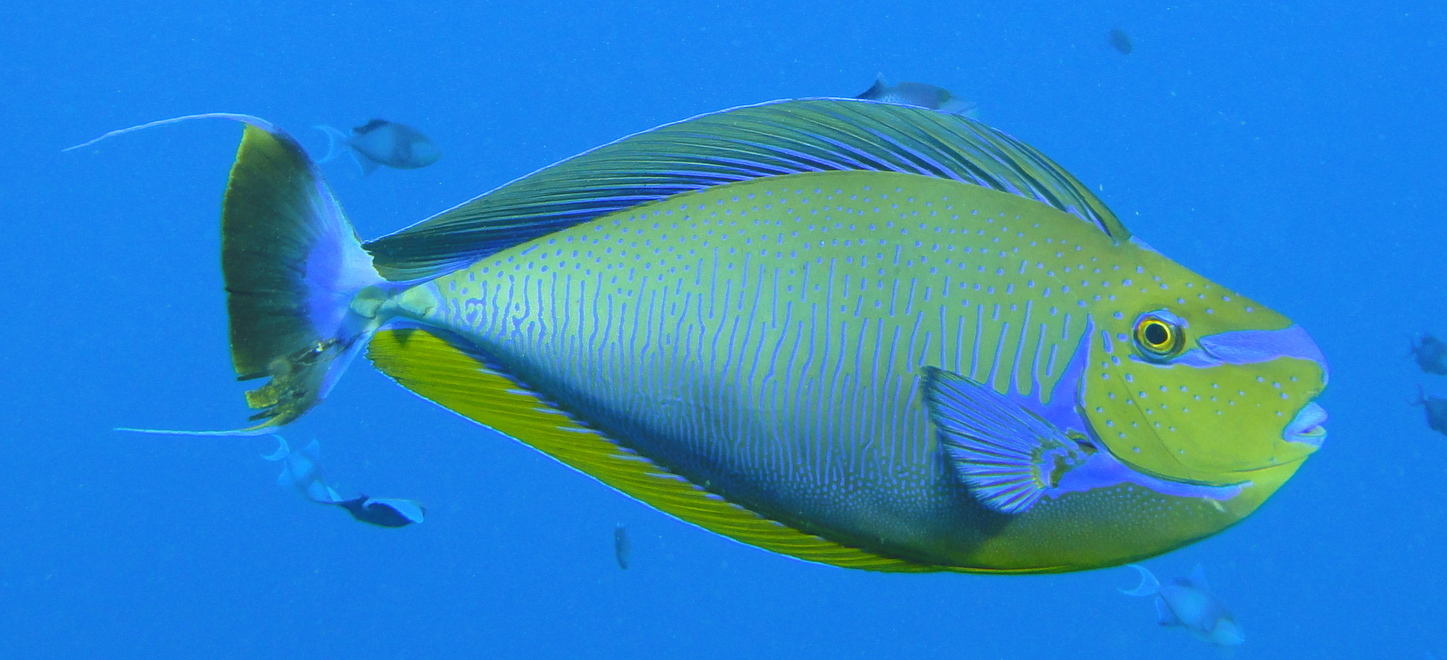
Adult

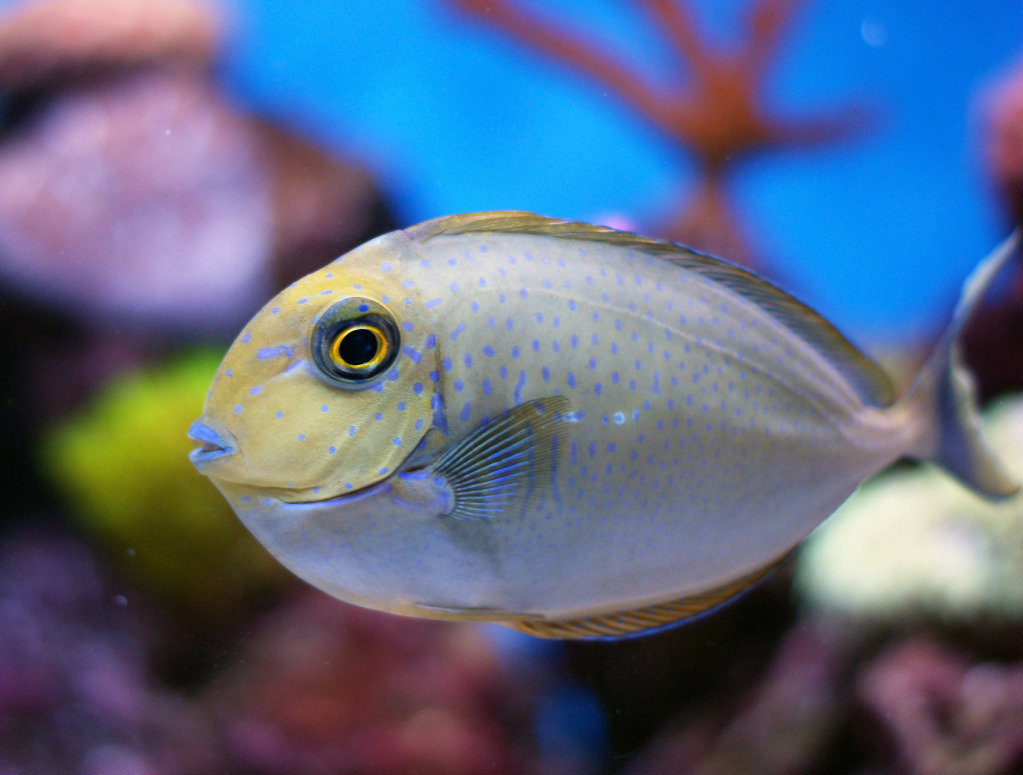
Juvenile

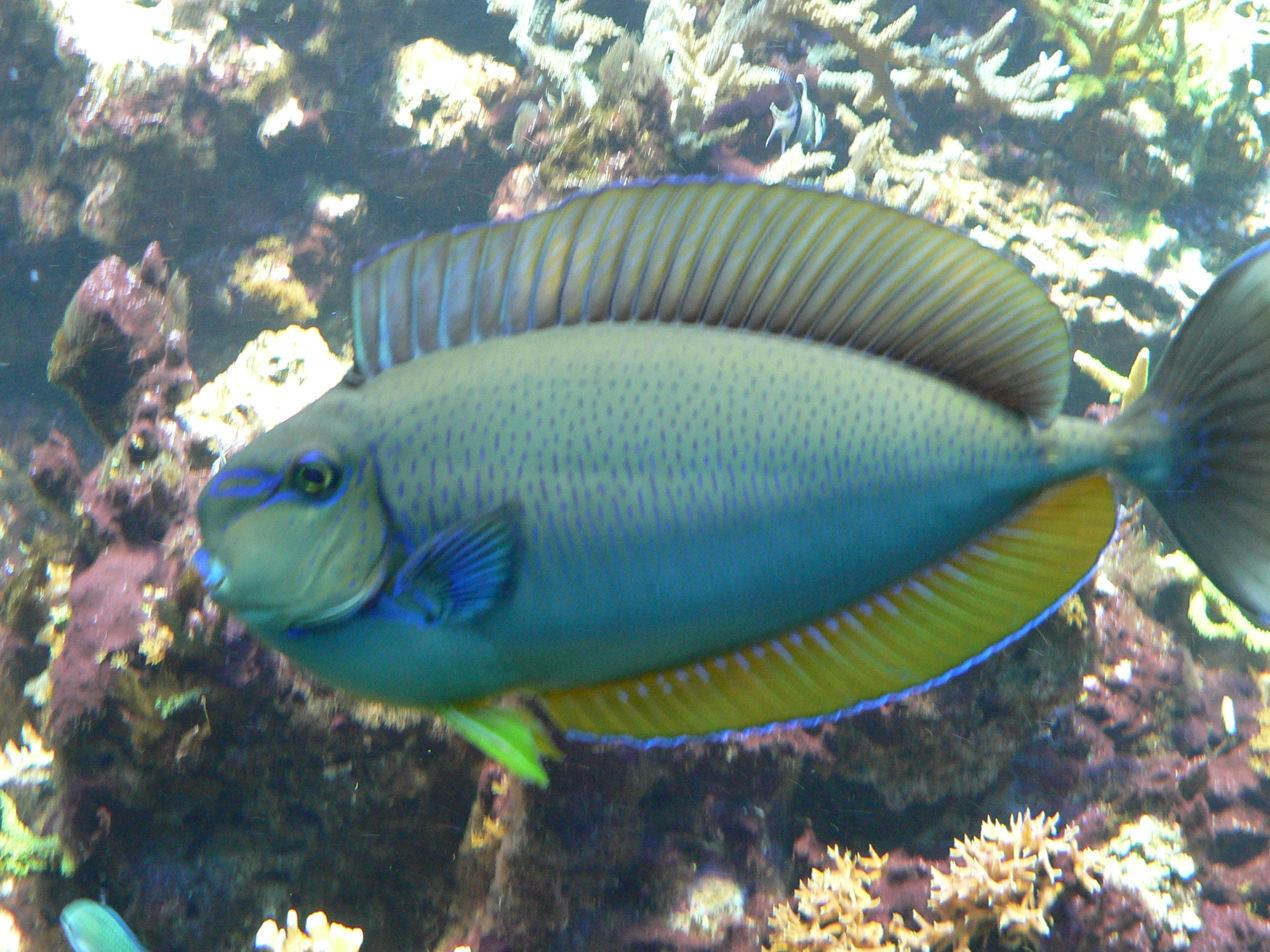
With fins fully extended

Naso vlamingii has 6 spines and 26 or 27 soft rays all of similar height supporting the tall dorsal fin and 2 spines and between 27 and 29 soft rays supporting the anal fin. It has a relatively deep body with standard lengths ranging from 2.2, in subadults, to 2.6, in adults, times the body's depth. There is an obvious bulbous protuberance growing from the head above the snout. There are two bony plates on each side of the caudal peduncle and these have keels with anterior pointing spines. The adults develop long filaments from the tips of the caudal fin lobes. The overall colour of the adults is greyish-brown or reddish brown, and they have the ability to change colour quickly, with small dark blue spots on the head and upper flanks. These spots join up to form stripes on the lower flanks. There is a wide blue band running from the eye to the front of the bulbous protuberance. The lips are blue and there is an irregular blue blotch to the rear of the base of the pectoral fin. The caudal fin is blue at its base, grey in the middle with an ill-defined yellow marginand blue outer edges of the lobes and this extends onto the filaments. The intensity of the colour of the blue markings can be increased to a brilliant blue when the fish is displaying in courtship or to communicate with cleaner fish at cleaning stations. This species has a maximum published length of 60 cm (24 in).

== Biology ==
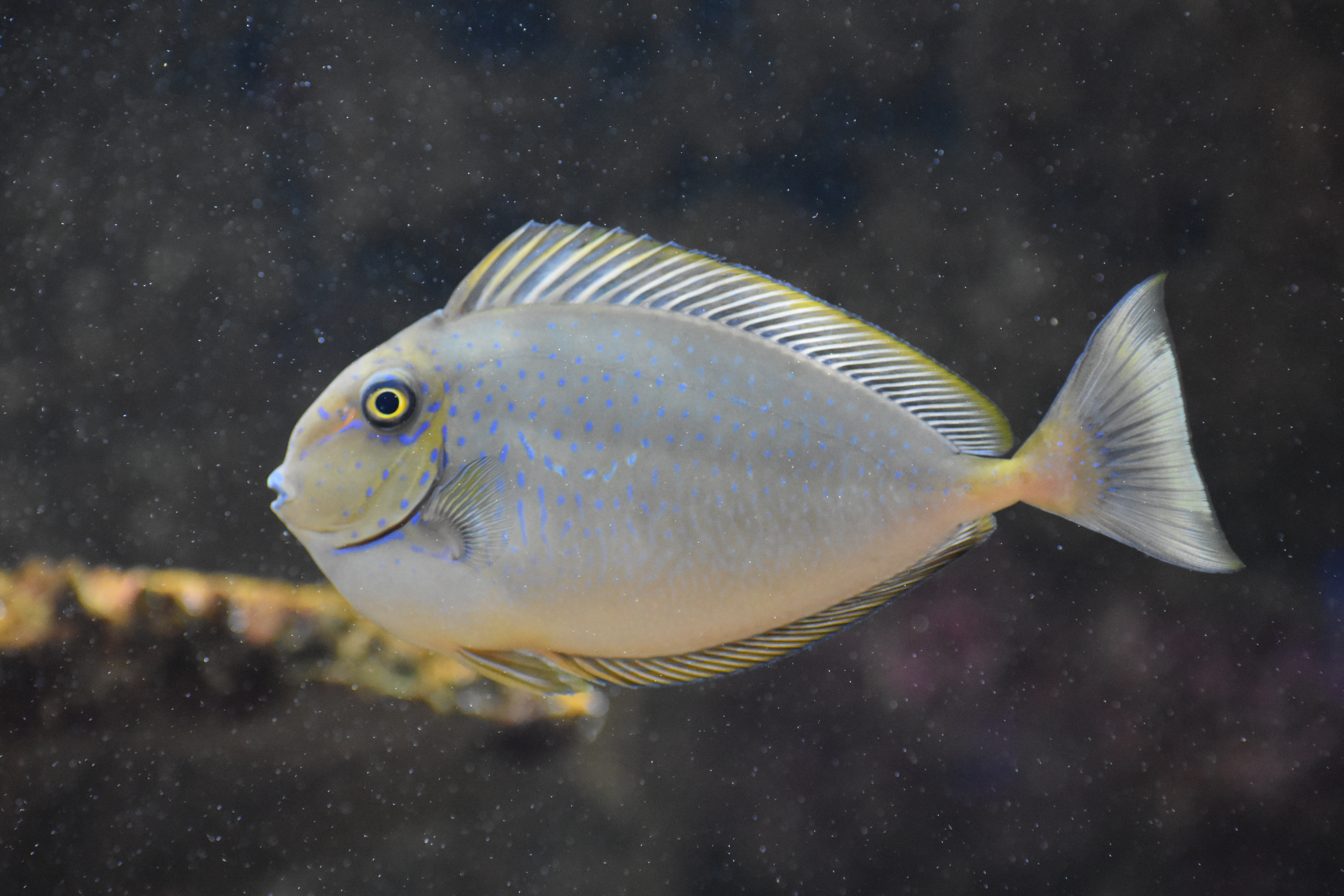
Juvenile

Naso vlamingii can live up to 40 years in captivity. Their eggs are fertilized externally after being released in batches by the female. Spawning typically occurs in aggregations, where many individuals come together to release their eggs and sperm simultaneously. They change their feeding pattern throughout their lives. Juveniles are herbivores; feeding mainly with algae, semi-adults are omnivores and adults are primarily carnivores; hunting for zooplankton. When they are young, they are often confused with Naso lopezi due to their similar appearance. They have been observed swimming at night among schools of predatory fish such as bigeye (Sphyraena forsteri) and blackfin barracudas (S. queni) and bigeye trevally (Caranx sexfasciatus) feeding on the faecal matter of these fishes.

== Fisheries ==
Naso vlamingii are targeted by subsistence fisheries in some areas, as well as being occasionally captured for the aquarium trade.

== Gallery ==
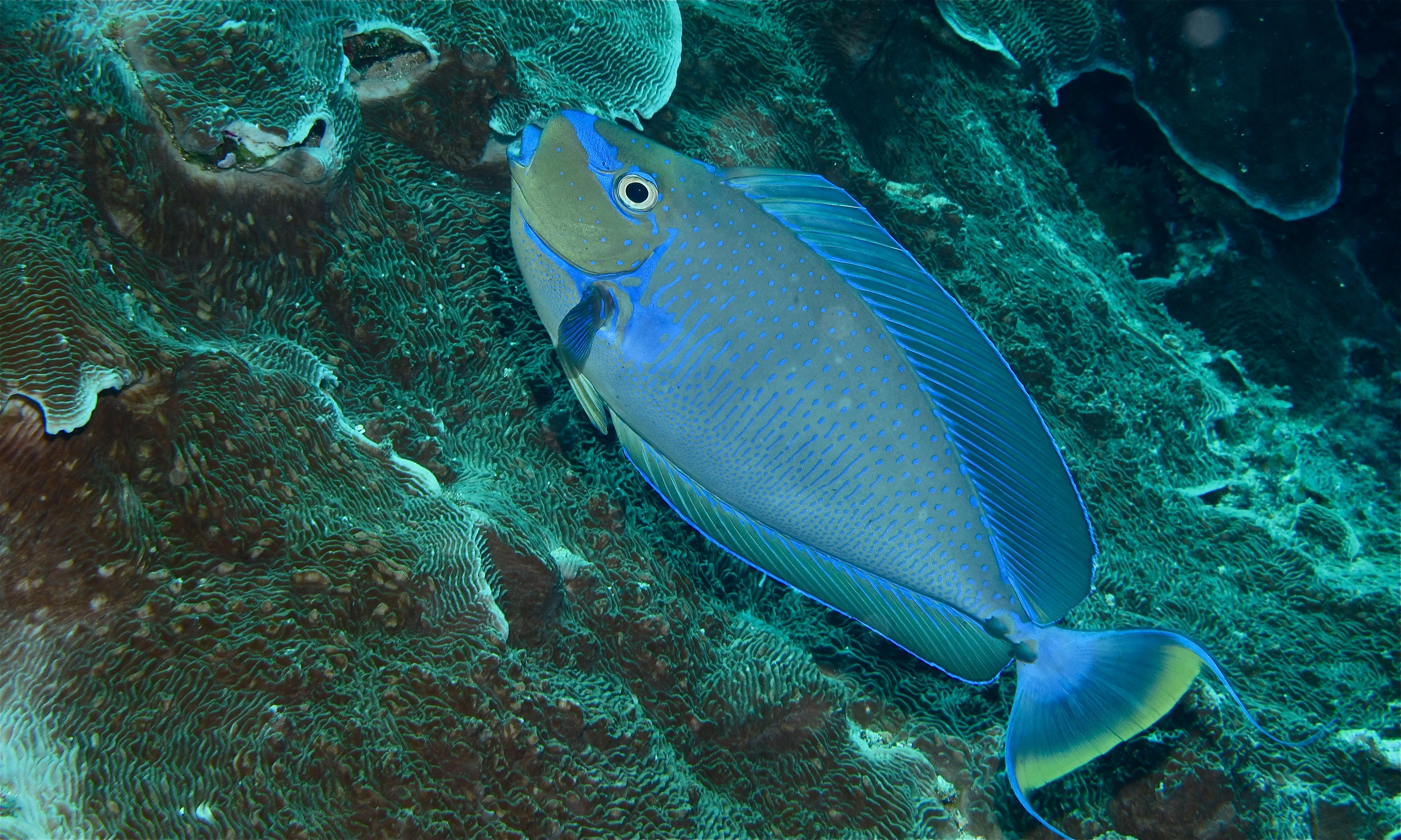

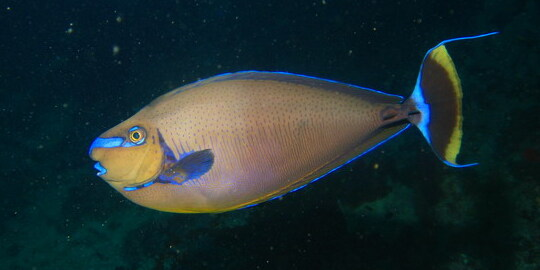

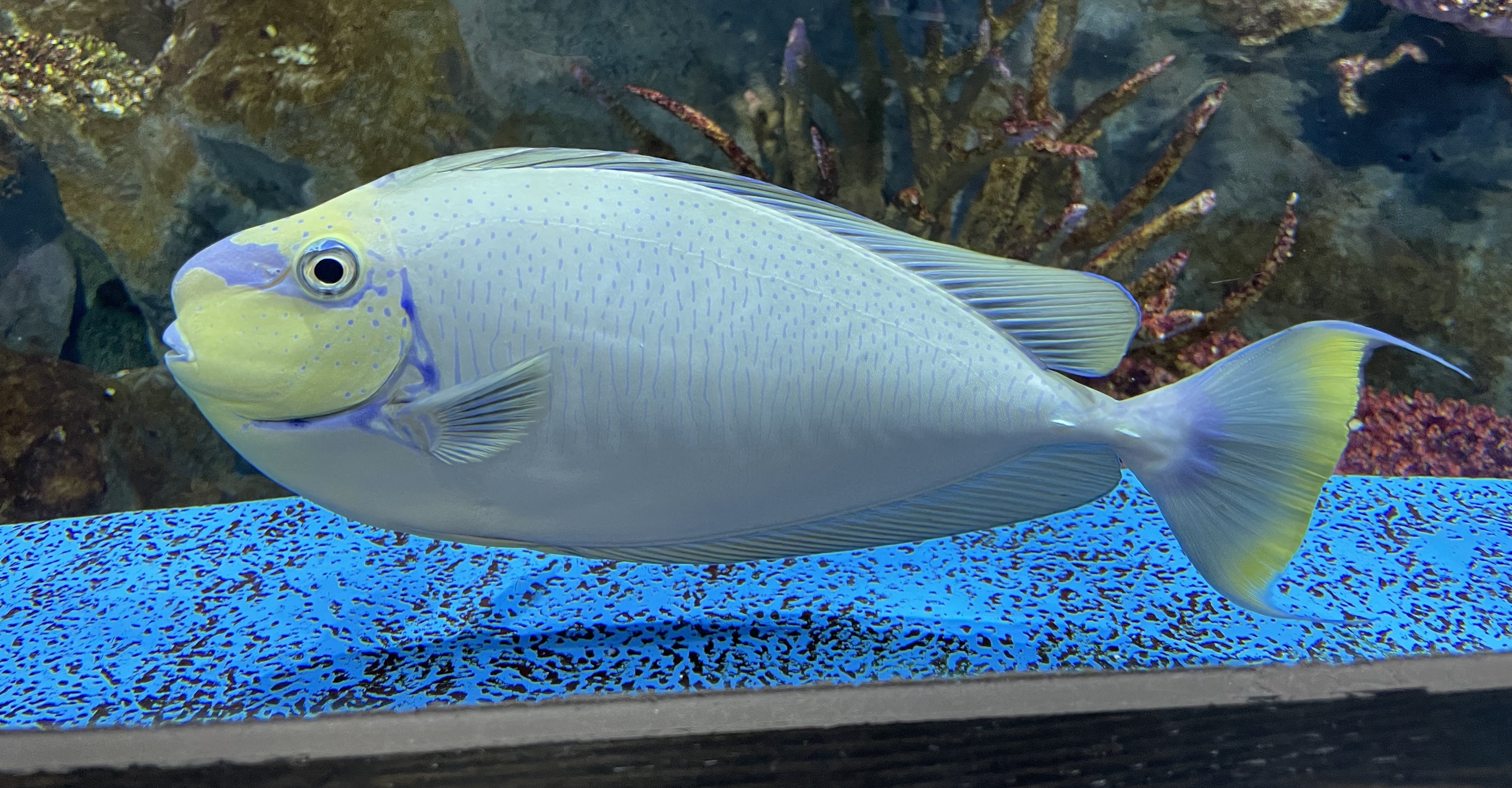
