= Caprovesposus =

Caprovesposus Temporal range: Early Oligocene to Middle Miocene

Scientific classification
- Kingdom: Animalia
- Phylum: Chordata
- Class: Actinopterygii
- Division: Teleostei
- Order: Acanthuriformes
- Family: Acanthuridae
- Genus: †Caprovesposus; Daniltshenko, 1960

Species
- †C. parvus Daniltshenko, 1960; †C. daniltshenkoi Bannikov, Tyler & Tyler, 2025

Extinct genus of fishes

Caprovesposus is an extinct, prehistoric surgeonfish that inhabited the Paratethys Sea from the Oligocene to Middle Miocene. It is known from a two species, both known from what is now the North Caucasus, Russia. The two described species are †C. parvus Daniltshenko, 1960 from the Early Oligocene, and †C. daniltshenkoi Bannikov, Tyler & Tyler, 2025 from the Early or Middle Miocene. Potential specimens are known from the Miocene of Egypt, but these are poorly preserved and this attribution is uncertain. Potential undescribed specimens are also known as far back as the Middle Eocene.

Known from very small fossils (up to 3 centimeters in length), it was initially described as a boarfish, but later studies found it to represent a pelagic larval (acronurus) or juvenile stage of a surgeonfish. The adult form is, as yet, unknown.

A 2026 study identified Caprovesposus as a crown group Acanthurinae, as the sister genus to the clade containing Zebrasoma and Paracanthurus.

== See also ==
- Prehistoric fish
- List of prehistoric bony fish
