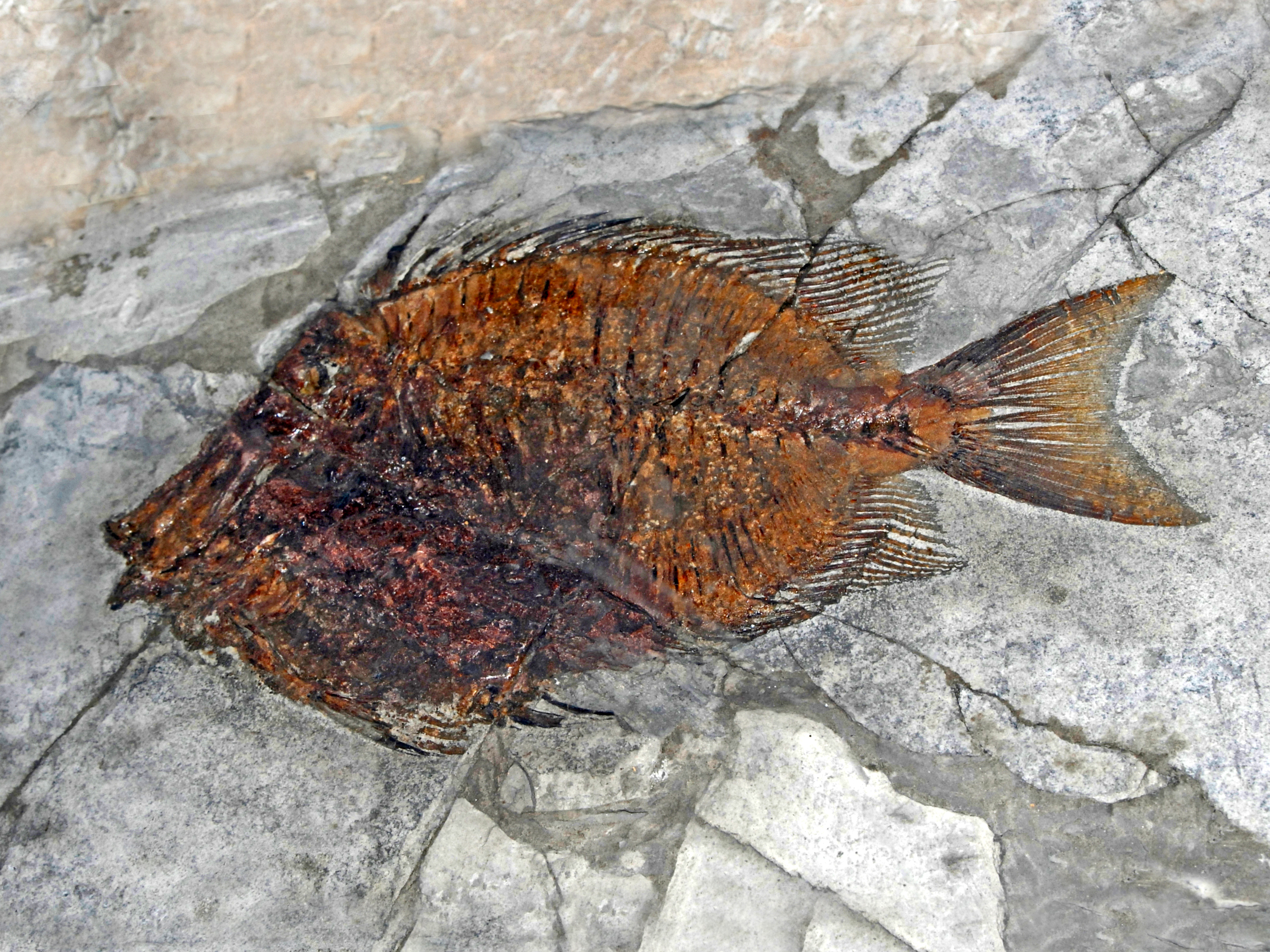
- Fossil of Naseus rectifrons from Monte Bolca (Italy)

Scientific classification
- Kingdom: Animalia
- Phylum: Chordata
- Class: Actinopterygii
- Order: Acanthuriformes
- Family: Acanthuridae
- Genus: †Naseus; Agassiz, 1842

= Naseus =

Naseus Temporal range: Lutetian

Extinct genus of fishes

Naseus is an extinct genus of surgeonfishes from the Lutetian-aged Monte Bolca Lagerstätte.

== Species ==
Species within this genus include:

- †Naseus nuchalis Agassiz, 1842
- †Naseus rectifrons Agassiz, 1842
