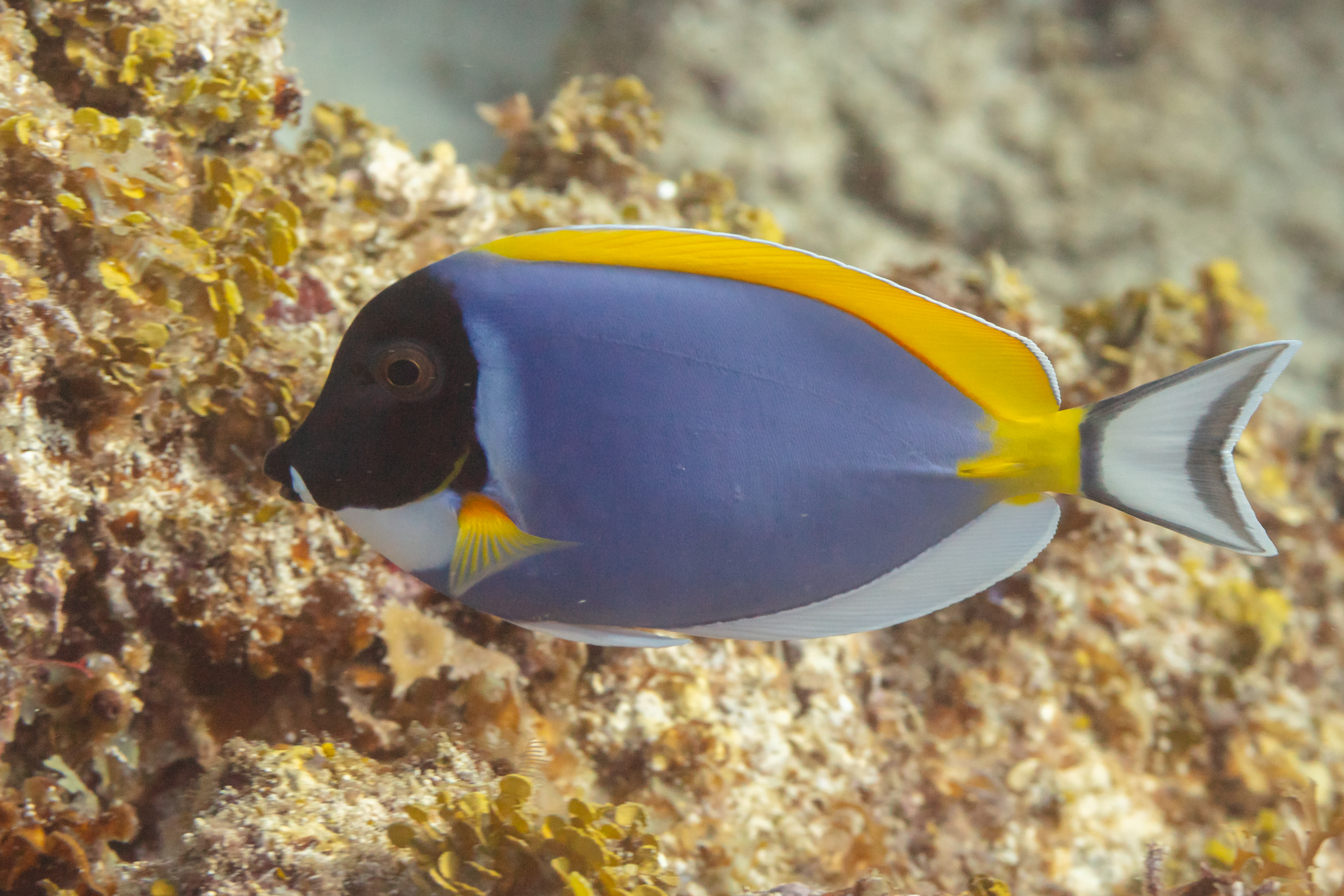

Conservation status
- Least Concern (IUCN 3.1)

Scientific classification
- Kingdom: Animalia
- Phylum: Chordata
- Class: Actinopterygii
- Order: Acanthuriformes
- Family: Acanthuridae
- Genus: Acanthurus
- Species: A. leucosternon

Binomial name
- Acanthurus leucosternon E. T. Bennett, 1833

Synonyms
- List: Hepatus leucosternon (Bennett, 1833); Rhombotides leucosternon (Bennett, 1833); Acanthurus delisiani Valenciennes, 1835; Acanthurus delisianus Valenciennes, 1835

= Acanthurus leucosternon =

Species of fish

Acanthurus leucosternon, commonly known as the blue surgeonfish, powder blue tang or powder-blue surgeonfish, is a species of marine ray-finned fish belonging to the family Acanthuridae, the surgeonfishes, unicornfishes and tangs. This species is found in the Indian Ocean.

== Taxonomy ==
Acanthurus leucosternon was first formally described in 1833 by the English naturalist Edward Turner Bennett with its type locality given as Sri Lanka. The genus Acanthurus is one of two genera in the tribe Acanthurini which is one of three tribes in the subfamily Acanthurinae which is one of two subfamilies in the family Acanthuridae.

== Etymology ==
Acanthurus leucosternon has the specific name leucosternon. This combines the Greek words leukos, meaning "white", and sternon, meaning "breast"; this refers to the white chest shown by this species.

== Description ==
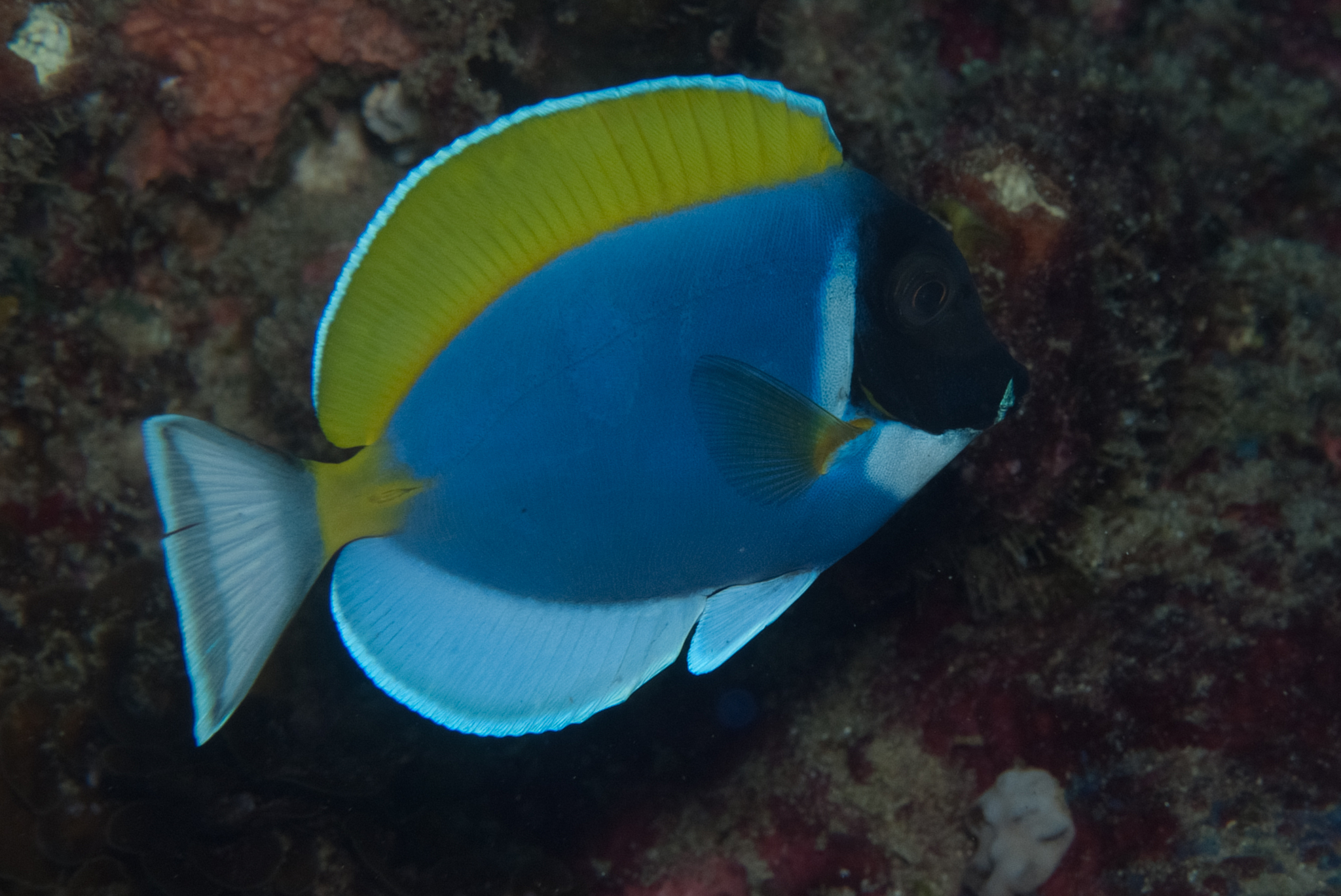
With fully extended fins, in Mozambique

The fish can reach an average size of 23 cm (9 in) in length. The body has an oval shape and is compressed laterally. Like other surgeonfishes, Acanthurus leucosternon swims with its pectoral fins. The caudal fin has a crescent shape. The fish has a "surgeon's scalpel," an erected part of the spine located at the base of the tail. The mouth is small and pointed in a beak-like manner with tiny and sharp teeth for reaching narrow spaces of food. Its sides are blue; its dorsal fin and the base of caudal fin are yellow; the head is black; the mouth, the throat area, the anal and pelvic fins are white. The pectoral fins are transparent with yellow reflections. The intensity of its blue color shows off if the fish is healthy or not. The fish does not undergo color changes as it matures; as some tangs, surgeonfish and unicornfish do.

== Distribution and habitat ==
Acanthurus leucosternon is found in tropical waters from the Indian Ocean. The species inhabits shallow and clear coastal waters always associated with a reef. It prefers flat top reefs and areas along seaward slopes.

== Behaviour ==
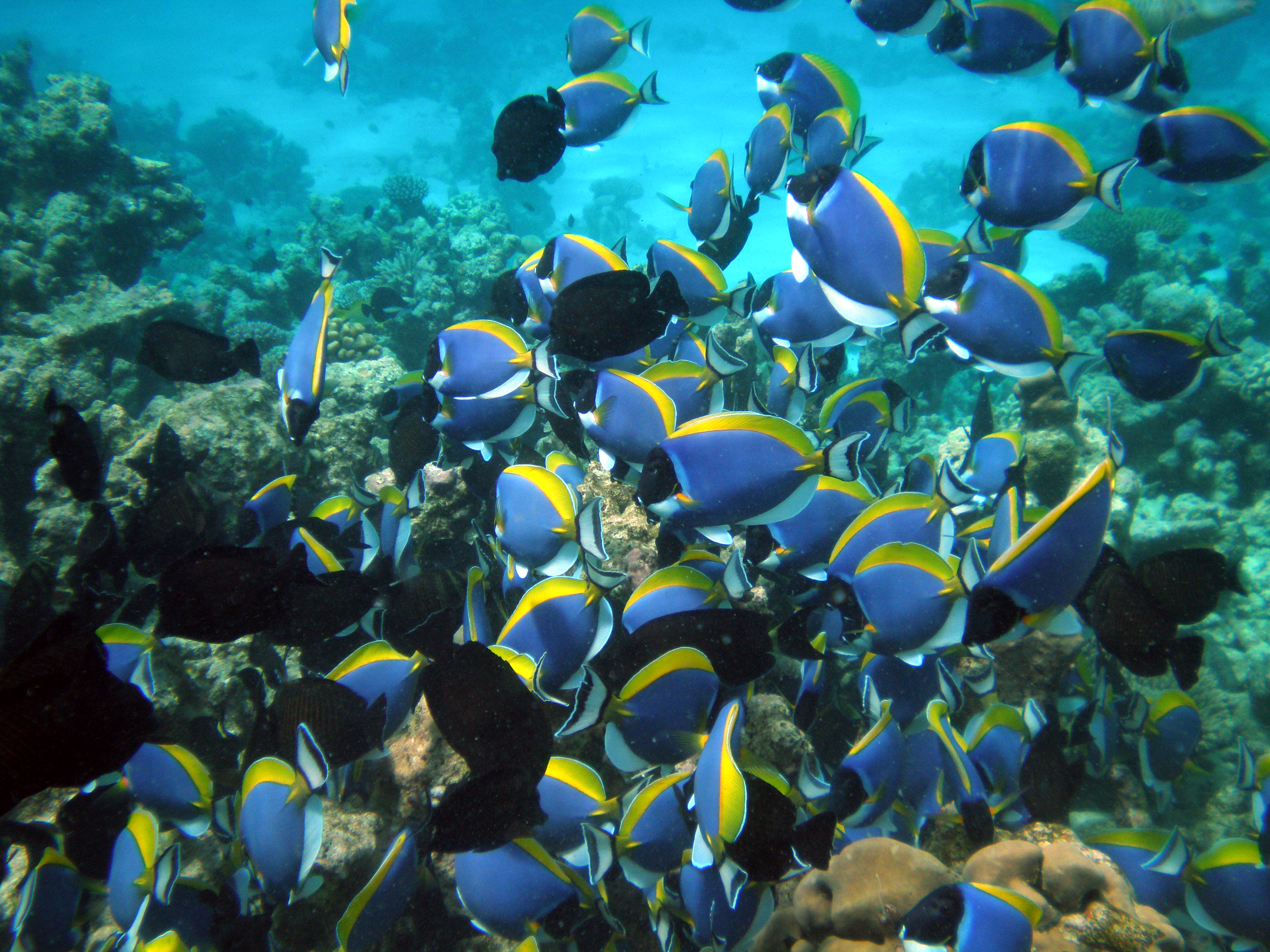
Acanthurus leucosternon shoaling in the Maldives, Indian Ocean

The powder blue tang, like most fish in the family Acanthuridae, is herbivorous, eating mostly benthic algae. Acanthurus leucosternon has a diurnal activity. It is solitary, territorial and aggressive with other surgeonfish. In cases where food is plentiful, it may feed in shoals, but in cases of scarcity, it may compete individually for food. It may use its surgeon's scalpel as a defensive weapon.

== Economic value ==
The powder blue tang is rarely harvested for anything other than the marine aquarium industry. It is a commonly sold fish that is moderately difficult to care for, although its popularity is easily exceeded by the regal tang and yellow tang. They are very prone to Cryptocaryon irritans. They are reef safe and are compatible with most species except other species of fish in the genus Acanthurus.
