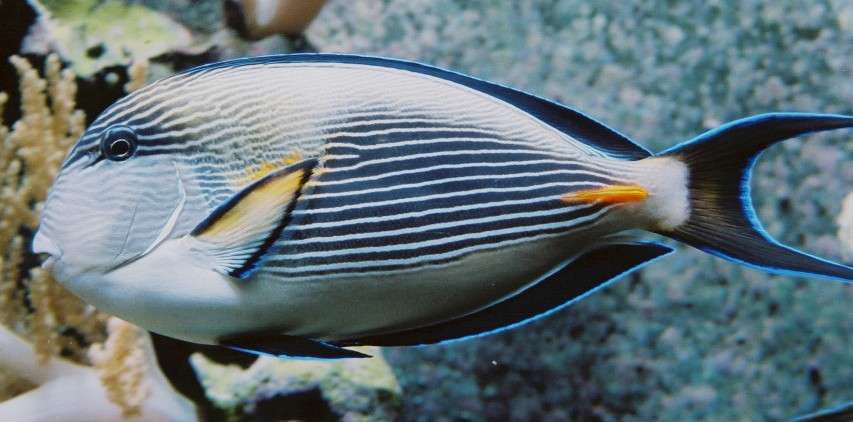
- Sohal surgeonfish, Acanthurus sohal. The orange mark on the tail peduncle shows where the spine is folded in.

Scientific classification
- Kingdom: Animalia
- Phylum: Chordata
- Class: Actinopterygii
- Division: Teleostei
- Order: Acanthuriformes
- Suborder: Acanthuroidei
- Family: Acanthuridae; Bonaparte, 1835

Type species
- Acanthurus triostegus (Linnaeus, 1758)

Genera
- see text

= Acanthuridae =

Surgeonfish Temporal range: Eocene–recent

Family of fishes with caudal spines

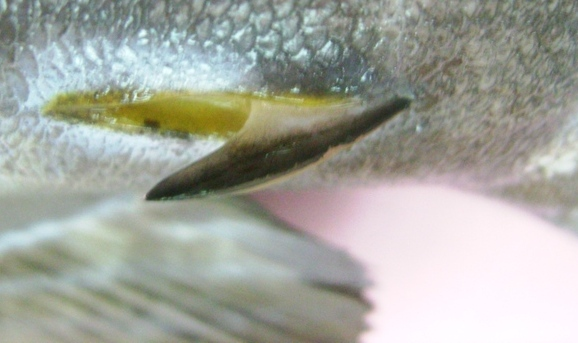
The exposed caudal spine of Acanthurus xanthopterus

The Acanthuridae are a family of ray-finned fishes, which includes surgeonfishes, tangs, and unicornfishes. The family includes about 86 extant species of marine fishes living in tropical seas, usually around coral reefs. Many of the species are brightly colored and popular in aquaria.

== Etymology ==
The family name comes from Ancient Greek terms ἄκανθα (ákantha), meaning "spine", and οὐρά (ourá), meaning "tail", a reference to the scalpel-like bony plates on the type species's caudal peduncle. In the early 1900s, the family was called Hepatidae.

== Subfamilies and genera ==
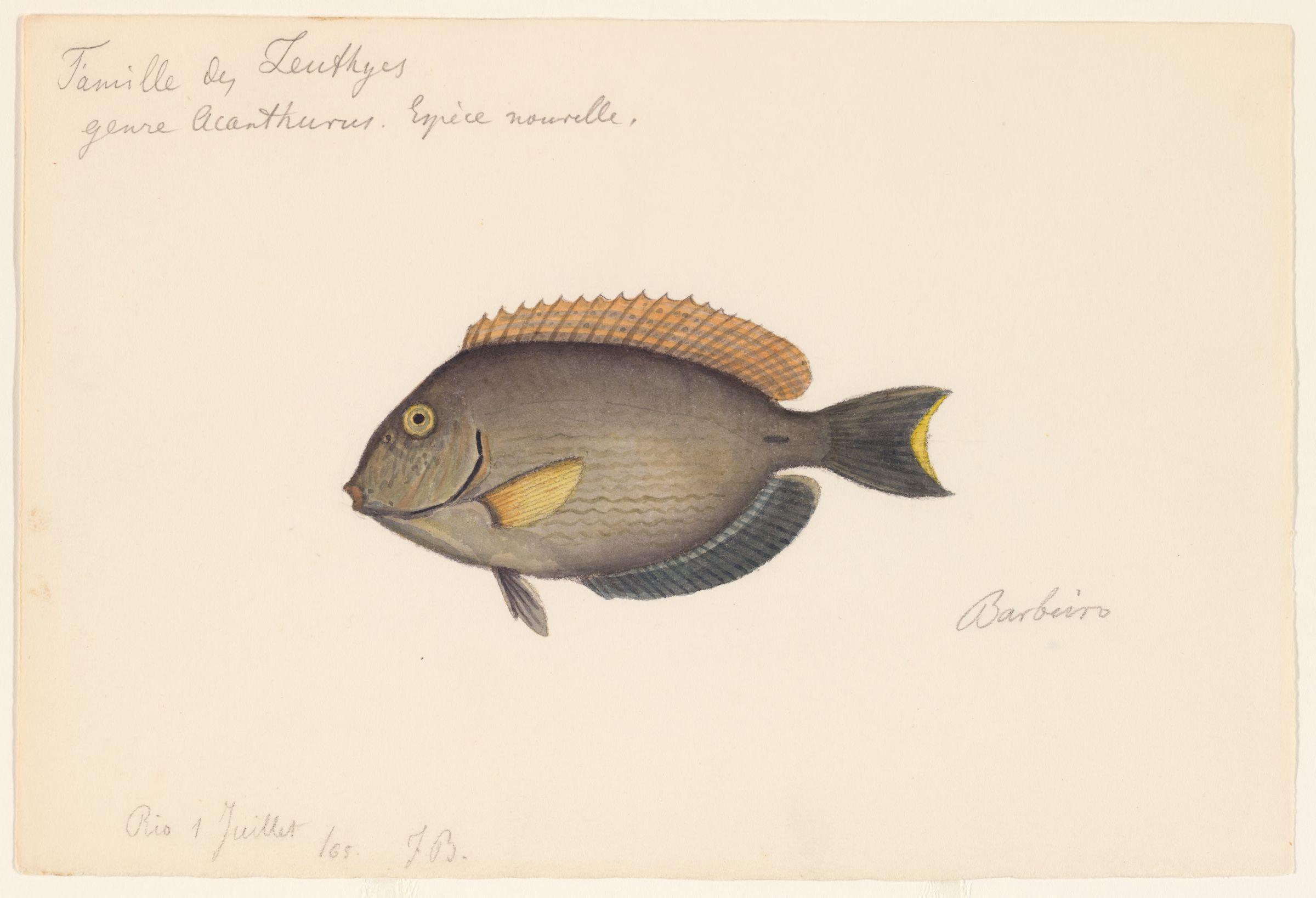
An 1865 watercolor of an Acanthurus by Jacques Burkhardt

The Acanthuridae family contains these extant subfamilies and genera:

- Subfamily Nasinae Fowler & Bean, 1929
  - Genus Naso Lacépède, 1801
- Subfamily Acanthurinae Bonaparte, 1835
  - Tribe Acanthurini Bonaparte, 1839
    - Genus Acanthurus Forsskål 1775
    - Genus Ctenochaetus Gill, 1884
  - Tribe Prionurini J. L. B. Smith, 1966
    - Genus Prionurus Lacépède, 1804
  - Tribe Zebrasomini Winterbottom, 1993
    - Genus Paracanthurus Bleeker, 1863
    - Genus Zebrasoma Swainson, 1839

=== Evolution and fossil record ===
Several extinct genera are known from fossils dating from the Eocene to Miocene:

==== Eocene genera ====
A particularly large diversity of fossil surgeonfish is known from the Monte Bolca Lagerstätte of Italy. These represent some of the earliest representatives of the individual tribes within the Acanthuridae.

- †Acanthuroides Blot & Tyler, 1990
- †Eorandallius Blot & Tyler, 1990 (=Naseus Agassiz, 1842 (preocc.))
- †Frigosorbinia Bannikov & Tyler, 2012
- †Gazolaichthys Blot & Tyler, 1990
- †Lehmanichthys Blot & Tyler, 1990
- †Metacanthurus Blot & Tyler, 1990
- †Metaspisurus Blot & Tyler, 1990
- †Padovathurus Tyler, 2005
- †Pesciarichthys Blot & Tyler, 1990
- †Proacanthurus Blot & Tyler, 1990
- †Protozebrasoma Sorbini & Tyler, 1998
- †Sorbinithurus Tyler, 1999
- †Tauichthys Tyler, 1999
- †Tylerichthys Blot, 1980

==== Oligocene genera ====
- †Arambourgthurus Tyler, 2000
- †Caprovesposus Daniltshenko, 1960
- †Glarithurus Tyler & Micklich, 2011
- ?†Eonaso Blot, 1984

==== Miocene genera ====
- †Marosichthys Whitley, 1951

== Morphology ==
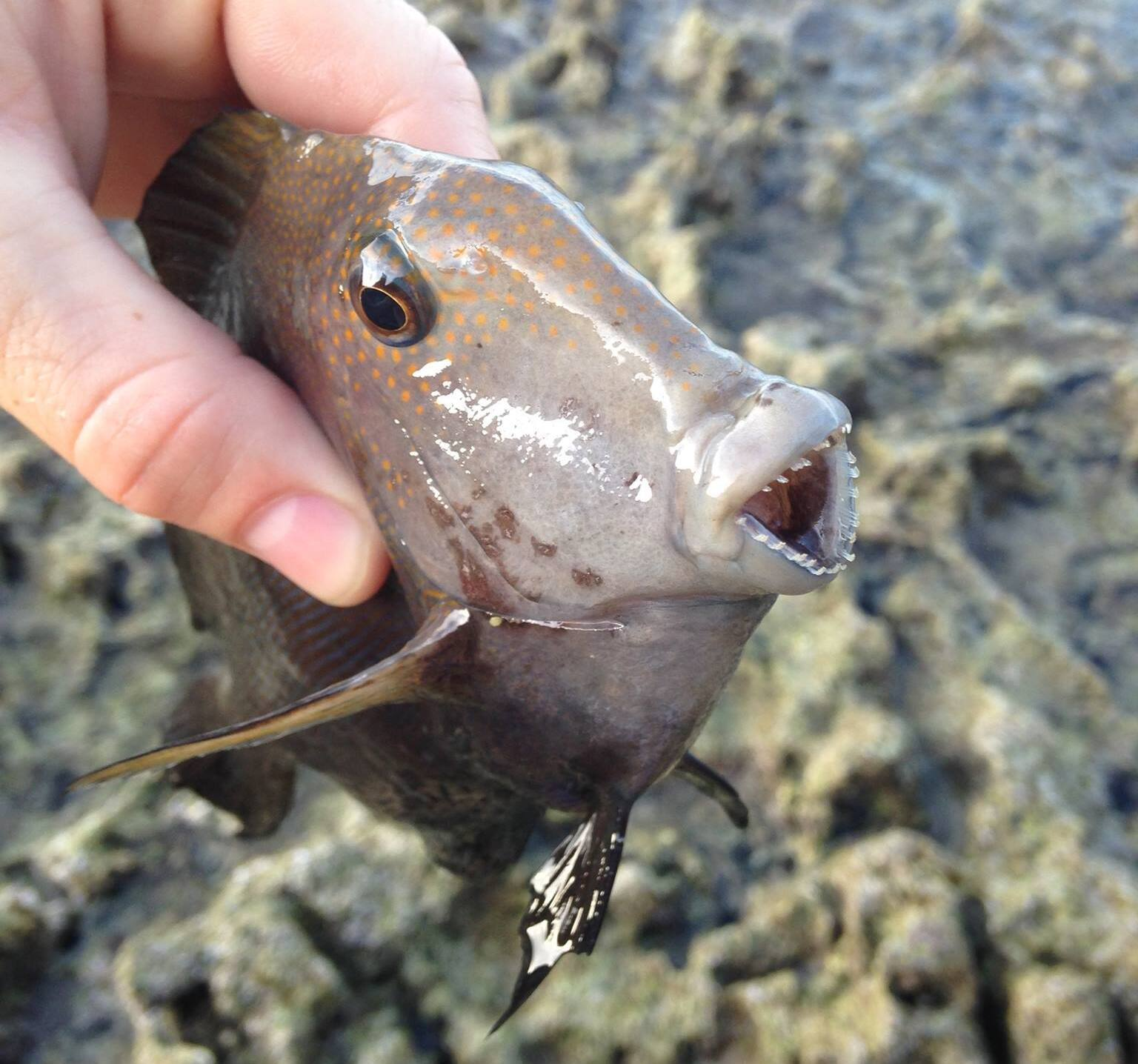
Teeth of the striated surgeonfish

The distinctive characteristic of the family is that they have scalpel-like modified scales, one or more on either side of the peduncle of the tail. The spines are dangerously sharp and may seriously injure anyone who carelessly handles such a fish. The dorsal, anal, and caudal fins are large, extending for most of the length of the body. Their mouths are small and have a single row of teeth adapted to grazing on algae.

Surgeonfishes sometimes feed as solitary individuals, but they often travel and feed in schools, which may be a mechanism for overwhelming the highly aggressive defense responses of small, territorial damselfishes that vigorously guard small patches of algae on coral reefs. Most species are fairly small, with a maximum length of 15–40 cm (6–15.5 in), but some in the genus Acanthurus, some in the genus Prionurus, and most species in the genus Naso may grow larger; the whitemargin unicornfish (Naso annulatus) is the largest species in the family, reaching a length up to 1 m (3 ft 3 in). These fishes may grow quickly in aquaria, so average growth size and suitability should be checked before adding them to any marine aquarium.

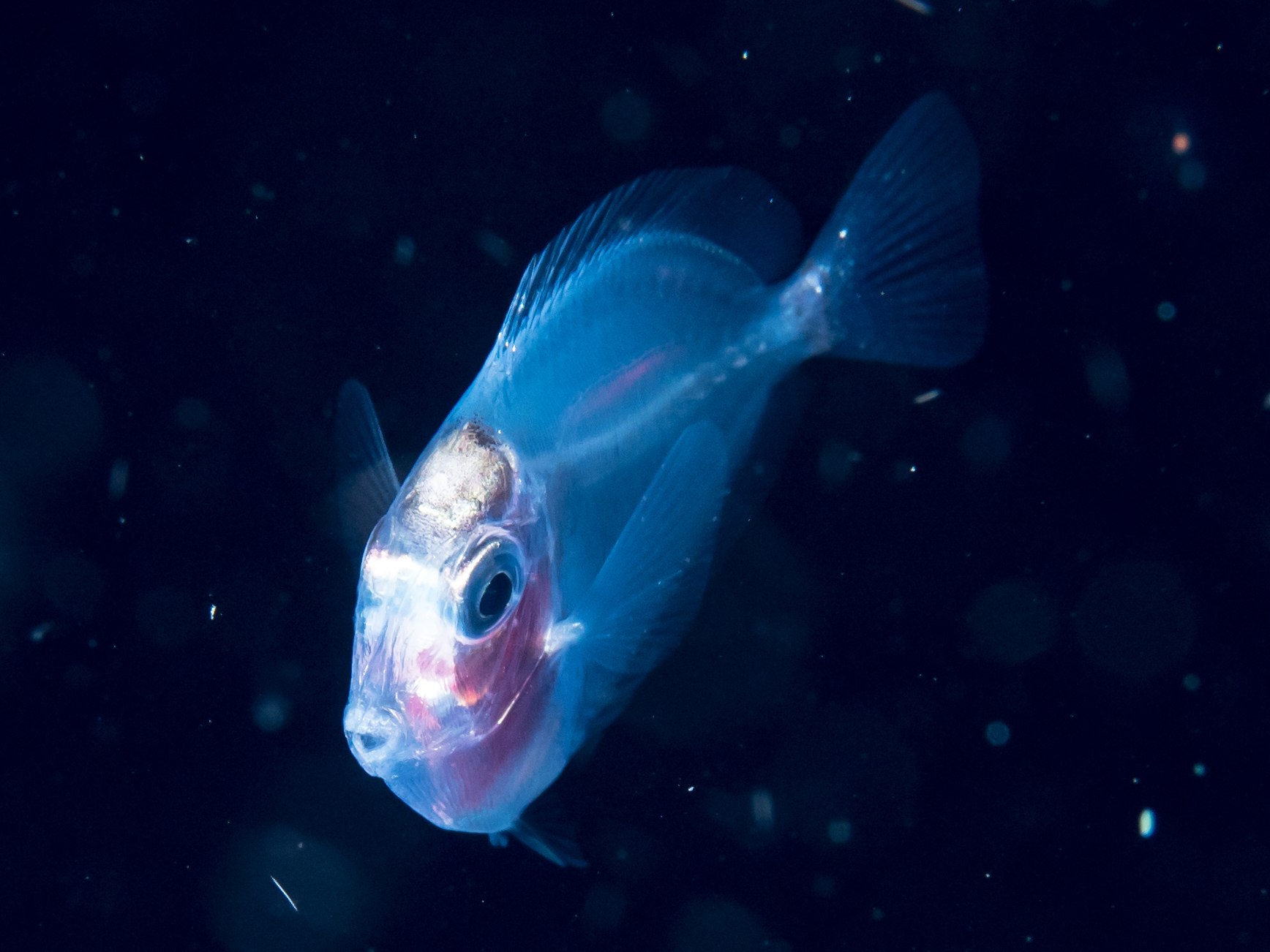
Acronurus stage of an unidentified Acanthurus near Morotai

A larval acanthurid, known as an acronurus, looks strikingly different from the juvenile and adult forms of the same individual. It is mostly transparent and tends to have a pelagic lifestyle, living in open water for an extended time before settling on the ocean bottom near the shore, where it develops into the juvenile and ultimately the adult form.

== Symbiotic bacteria ==
Acanthurids are the only known hosts of the bacteria of the genus Epulopiscium. These bacteria affect the digestion of surgeonfish, enabling them to digest the algae in their diet.

== Gallery ==
Selected species

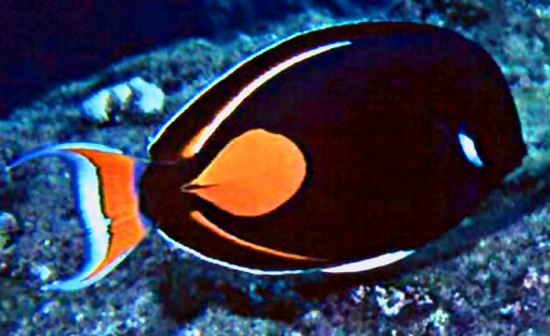
Achilles tang, Acanthurus achilles

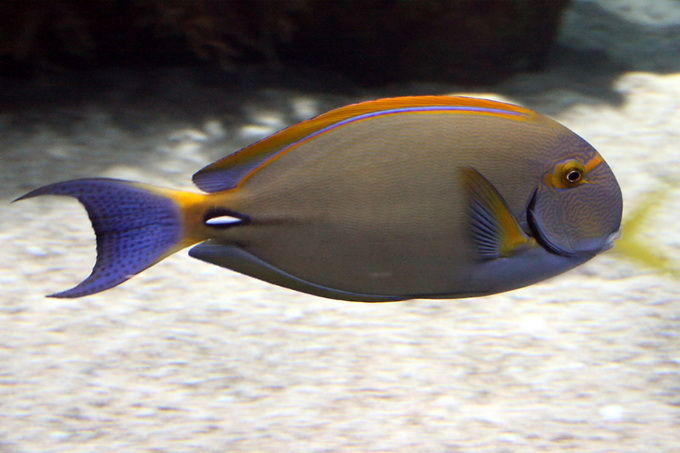
Eyestripe surgeonfish, Acanthurus dussumieri

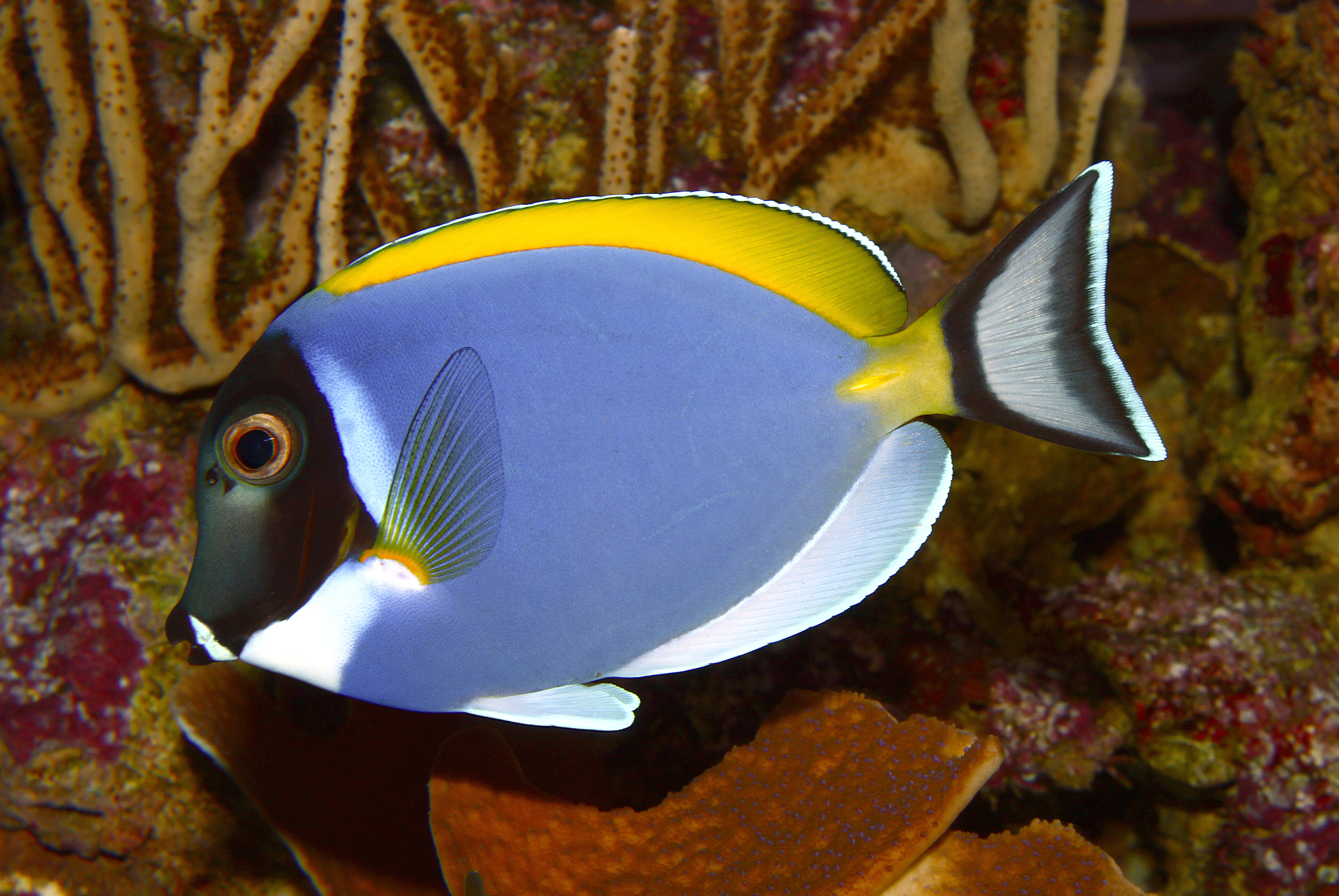
Powderblue surgeonfish, Acanthurus leucosternon

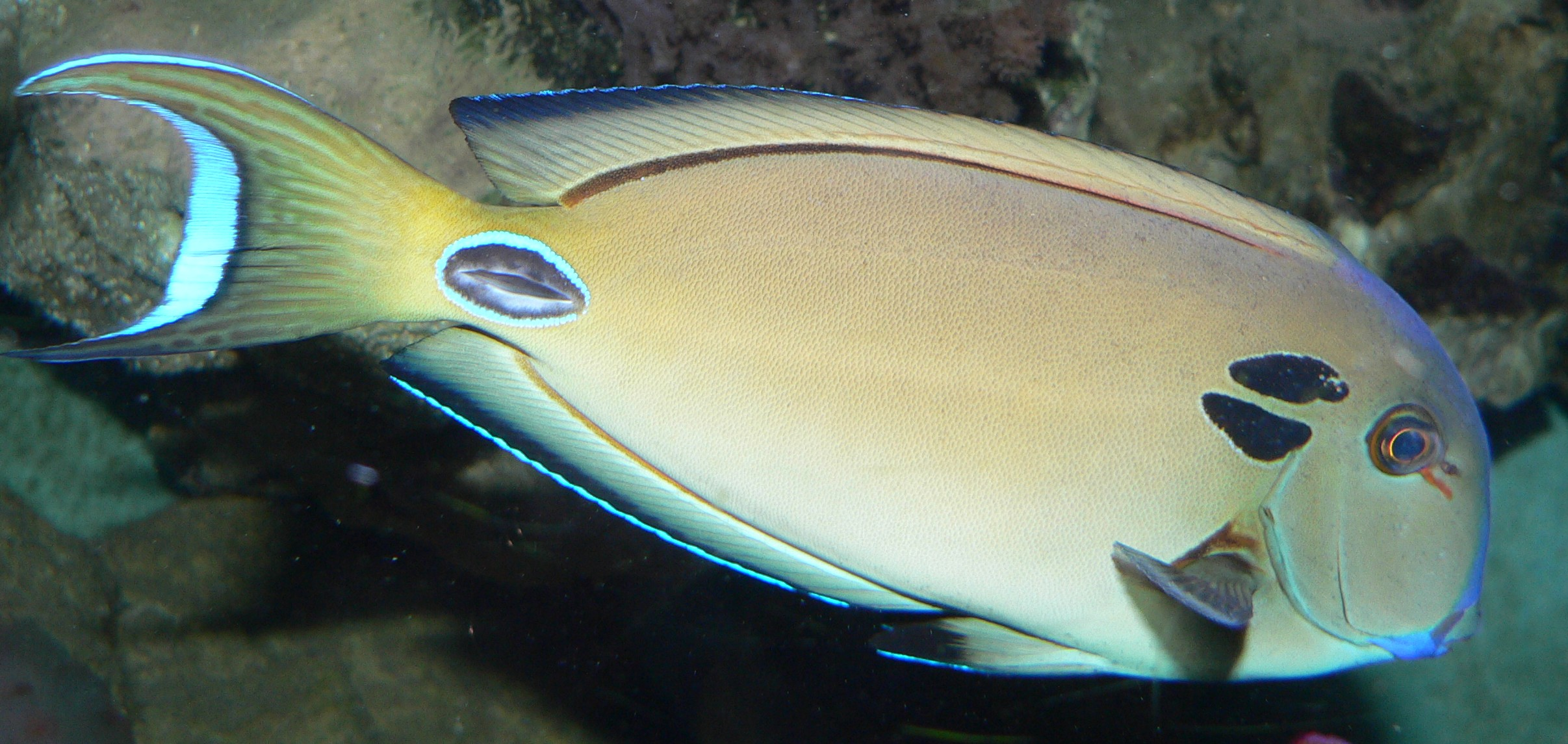
Doubleband surgeonfish, Acanthurus tennenti

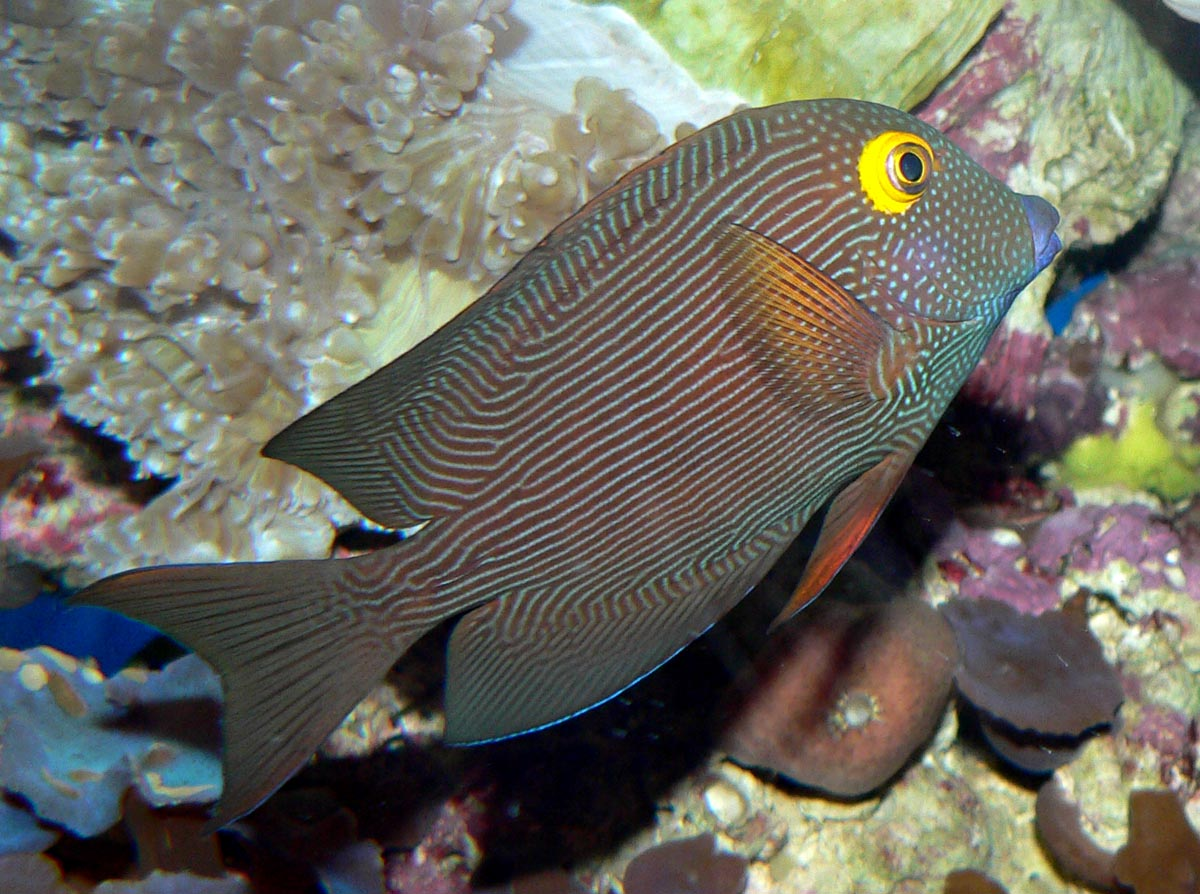
Kole tang, Ctenochaetus strigosus

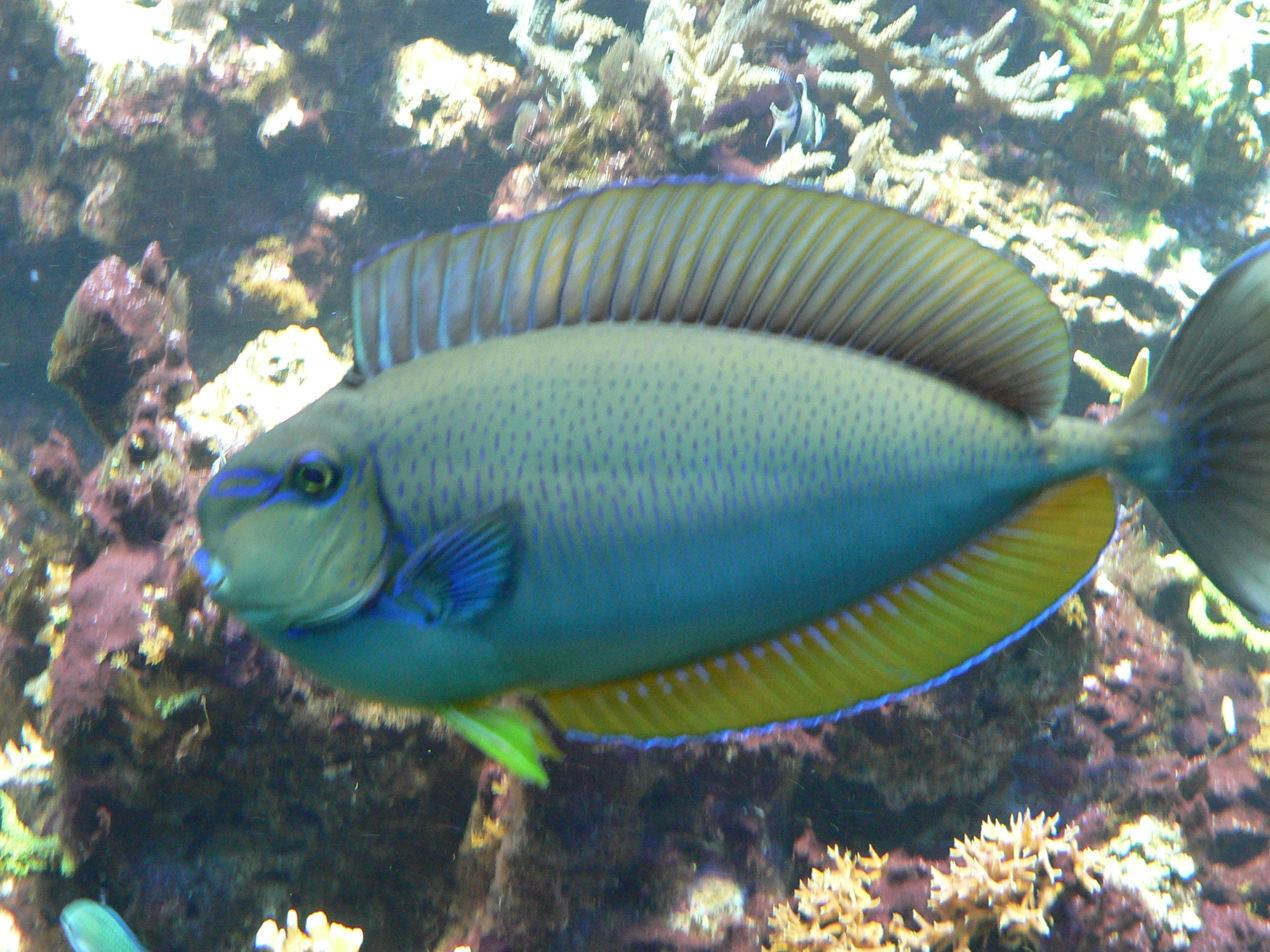
Bignose unicornfish, Naso vlamingii

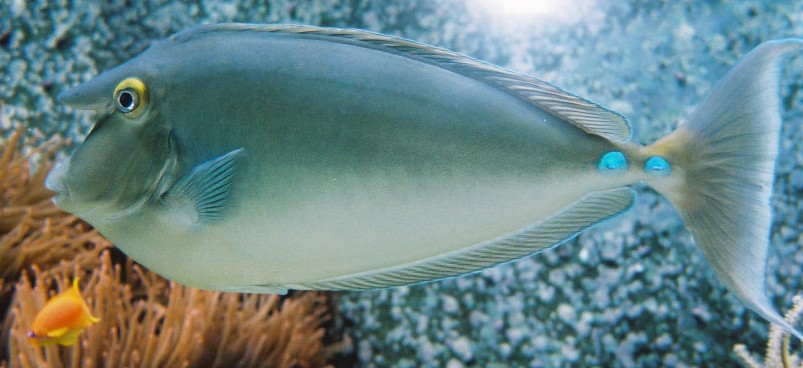
Bluespine unicornfish, Naso unicornis

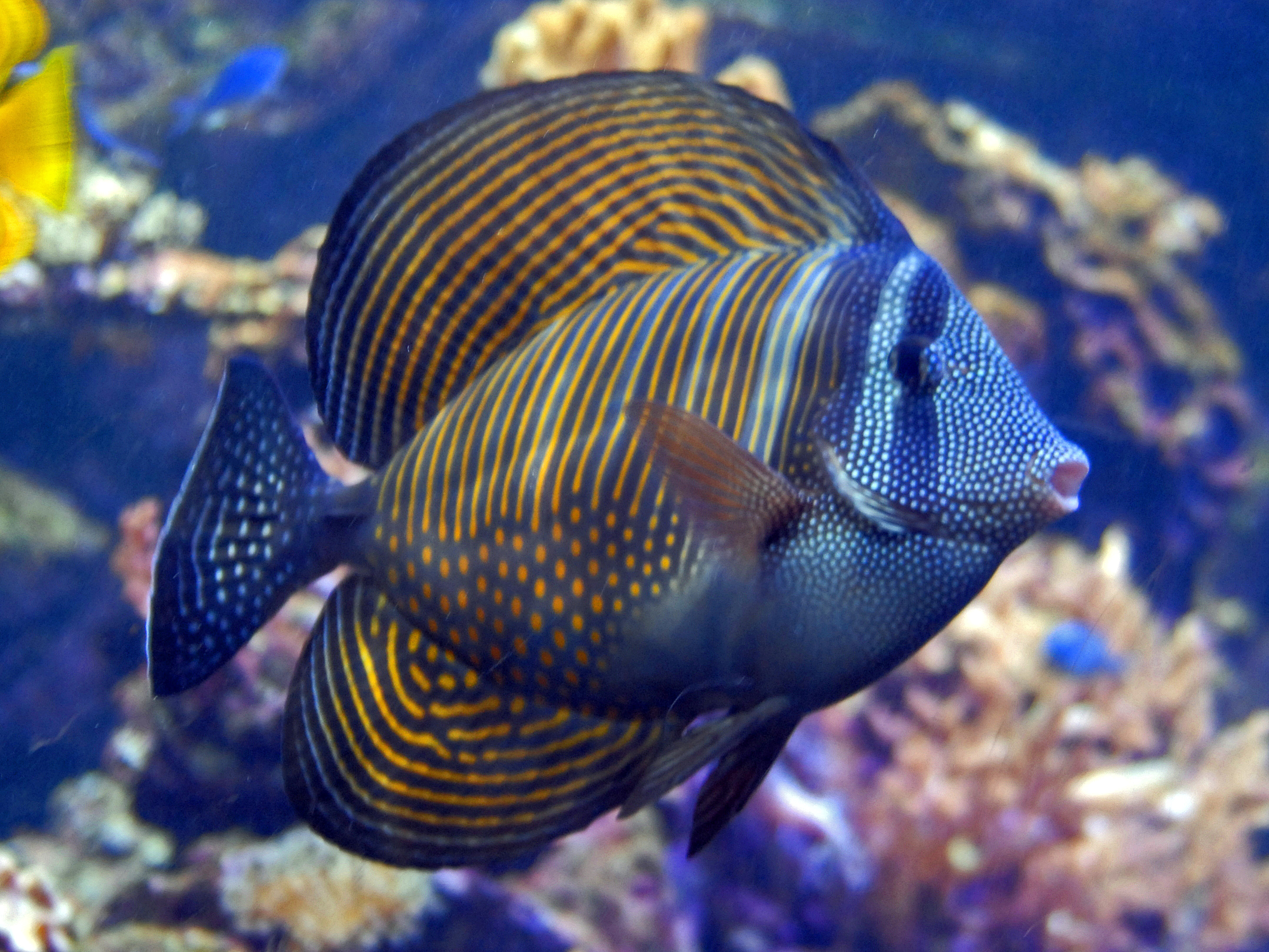
Red Sea sailfin tang, Zebrasoma desjardinii

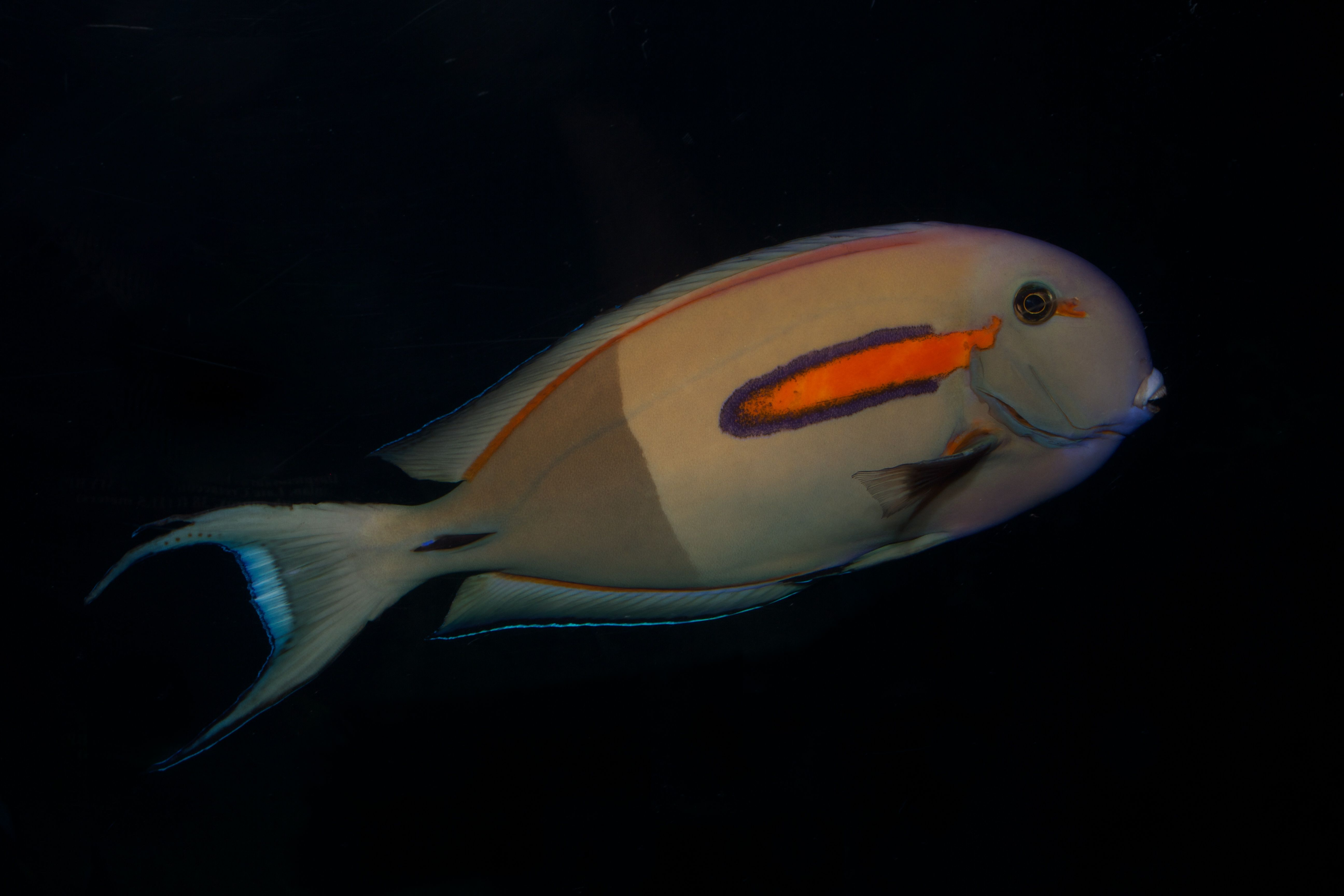
Orangespot surgeonfish, Acanthurus olivaceus

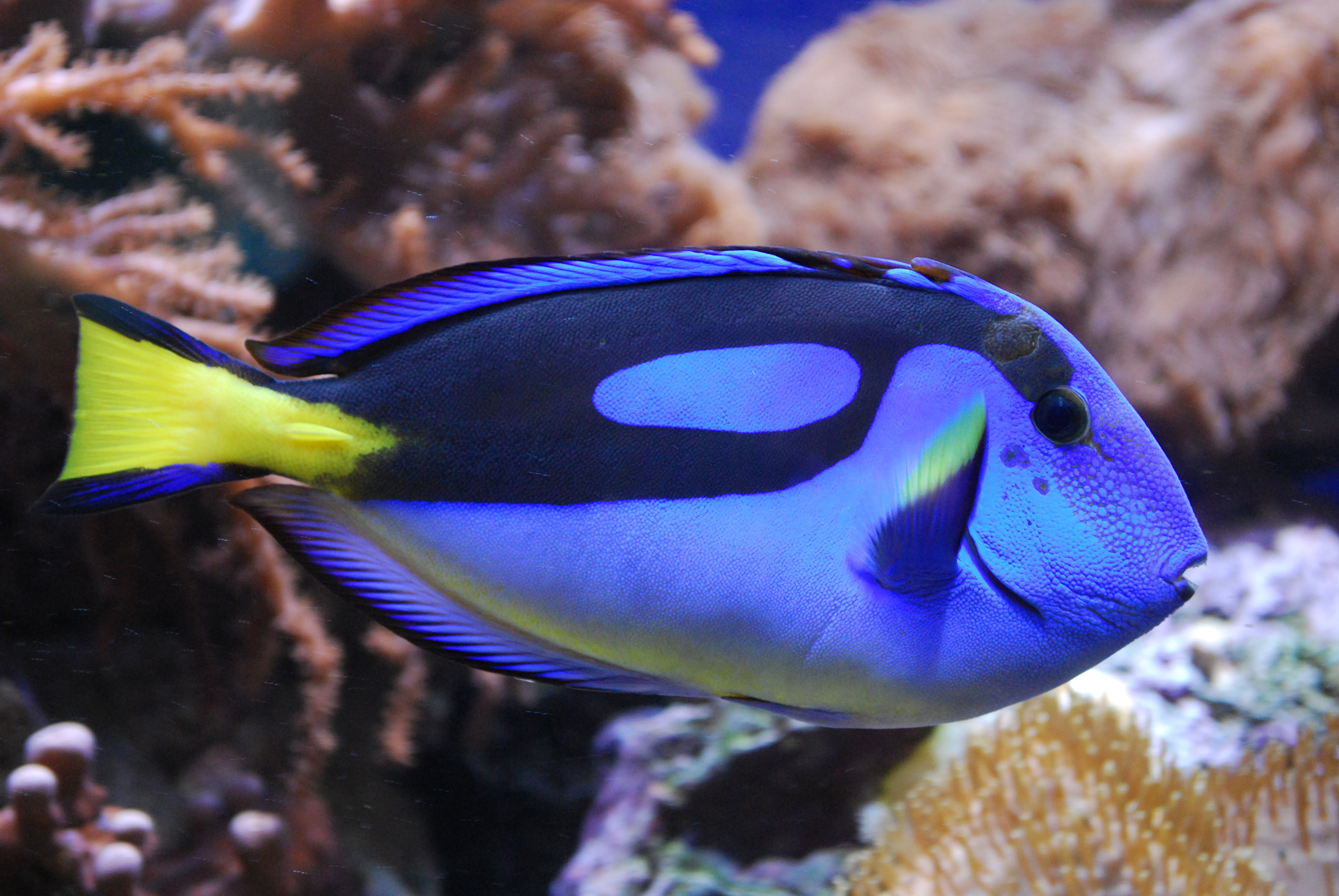
Regal tang, Paracanthurus hepatus in an aquarium
