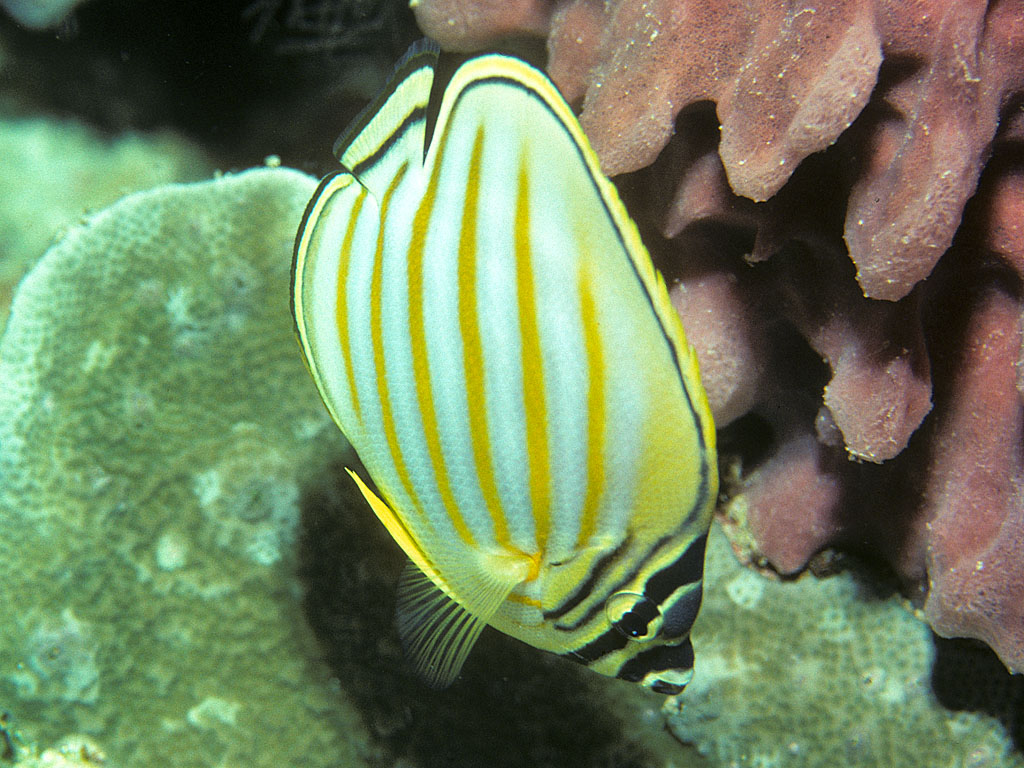
- At Sipadan Island (Malaysia)

Conservation status
- Least Concern (IUCN 3.1)

Scientific classification
- Kingdom: Animalia
- Phylum: Chordata
- Class: Actinopterygii
- Division: Teleostei
- Order: Acanthuriformes
- Family: Chaetodontidae
- Genus: Chaetodon
- Subgenus: Chaetodon (Citharoedus)
- Species: C. ornatissimus

Binomial name
- Chaetodon ornatissimus G. Cuvier, 1831

Synonyms
- Citharoedus ornatissimus (Cuvier, 1831); Chaetodon ornatus Gray, 1831; Chaetodon ornatissimus kaupi Ahl, 1923; Chaetodon lydiae Curtiss, 1938

= Ornate butterflyfish =

Species of fish

The ornate butterflyfish (Chaetodon ornatissimus), or clown butterflyfish is a species of marine ray-finned fish, a butterflyfish in the family Chaetodontidae.

The ornate butterflyfish is a close relative of the mailed butterflyfish (C. reticulatus) and the scrawled butterflyfish (C. meyeri). Together they make up the subgenus called "Citharoedus", but as this name had already been used for the mollusk genus when it was given to the fish, it is not valid. They are probably quite close to the subgenus Corallochaetodon, which contains the melon butterflyfish (C. trifasciatus). Like these, they might be separated into Megaprotodon if the genus Chaetodon is split up.

== Morphology ==
Chaetodon ornatissimus is most easily identified by its color pattern, which helps protect it from predators. Ornate butterflyfish have white bodies with orange to orange-brown oblique bands. They also have two yellow-edged black bars on their head: one runs across the eyes and the other is on the snout, and the tail has two black bars. The size of the ornate butterflyfish ranges from 13 to 18 cm total length (mean ± SD = 16.2 ± 1.4 cm) and pair members are nearly always indistinguishable based on size.

== Behavior ==
Ornate butterflyfish adults are predominately found in pairs that occupy exclusive territories, including Clearwater lagoons and seaward reefs rich in coral growth (size range ~100–1400 m^{2}). On the other hand, juvenile Chaetodon ornatissimus live in solitary, tend to be shy, and hide in the arms of branching corals for protection. Once juveniles reach breeding age, they form pairs. It is uncommon to find adult Chaetodon ornatissimus without a mate. Pairs also establish a "home range" where they are likely always to be found.

== Reproduction ==
Ornate butterflyfish are monogamous and pair-forming coral reef fish. Many ornate butterflyfish mate for life. Spawning activity occurs at different times depending on each biome. Tropical spawning peaks in winter and early spring, while temperate spawning occurs in midsummer. Spawning occurs at dusk and eggs are released and fertilized in the water column.

== Habitat and range ==
The ornate butterflyfish is widespread throughout the tropical waters of the Indo-Pacific area, ranging from Sri Lanka to Hawaii, the Marquesas, the Pitcairn Islands, North to Southern Japan, South to Lord Howe, and Rapa in the Austral Islands. Over three-quarters of the world's fish species inhabit this region. The environment C. ornatissimus lives in is marine, inshore, tropical (30°N – 30°S, 77°E – 124°W) and reef associated. They tend to live at a depth range between 1–36 meters.

== Habitat threats ==
Ornate butterflyfish like other coral reef organisms, have many natural and anthropogenic disruptions which play a major role in loss of habitat of. Sessile, benthic communities on tropical coral reefs experience natural disruptions including tropical storms, unseasonal temperature extremes and infestations of crown-of-thorn sea stars (Acanthaster planci). These events are becoming more frequent, which makes anthropogenic influences more chronic. Anthropogenic disturbances include overfishing, pollution and coastal development, all of which cause depletion in corals. Over 30 percent of the coral reef communities in the world have already been degraded; however, by 2030 more than 60 percent of coral reef communities will have been lost.

These changes in the structure of benthic coral reef habitats have adverse effects on coral reef fish, specifically butterflyfish. Several studies have documented the decline of butterflyfish, and localized extinctions, following coral depletion. A study by Pratchett et al., revealed that declines in abundance of Chaetodon butterflyfish were almost certainly related to coral depletion. Declines in abundances of butterflyfish were due to starvation.

Another adverse anthropogenic effect which alters habitat community composition is the shift from coral-dominated to seaweed-dominated benthic communities. Coral reef communities provide shelter and food resources for Butterflyfish. However, the presence of seaweed has a substantial impact on butterflyfish, as they actively avoid corals in contact with seaweed.
Anthropogenic impacts of overfishing of herbivorous fish and increase of eutrophication create favorable conditions for seaweed growth. Increase in seaweed-dominated benthic communities limits expansion of coral colonies and availability of surfaces for larval settlement and development.

== Diet and feeding ==
Ornate butterflyfish feed exclusively on coral polyp tissue and small organisms. Ornate butterflyfish feed on ten different coral species, which is the broadest range of corals when compared with other coral-eating butterflyfish species. Other obligate corallivores (coral-eating) butterflyfish species include: Chaetodon austriacus, C. baronessa, C. bennetti, C. larvatus, C. lunulatus, C. meyeri, C. octofasiatus, C. rainfordi, and C. trifasicatus. Butterflyfish are obligate corallivores, which means the majority of their diet must be made up of live coral polyp – coral mucous rather than coral tissue. Butterflyfish have very fine hair-like teeth that enable them to pick out small organisms inaccessible to most other fish for eating. They thrive mainly on a diet of coral polyps, tentacles of feather dusters and Christmas-tree worms. All of those food sources tend to crawl back into their shells; therefore, butterflyfish need to be able to hover motionless while picking at the coral, and to dart swiftly over short distances to get the organisms that retreat into hiding before they retract. Ornate Butterflyfish are able to do this by using their pectoral fins as oars to brake, sprint, turn and reverse.

== Economic importance ==
Ornate butterflyfish are one of the most popular tropical fishes with divers and aquarists. However, ornate butterflyfish are nearly impossible to keep successfully in captivity, because they are obligate corallivores.
