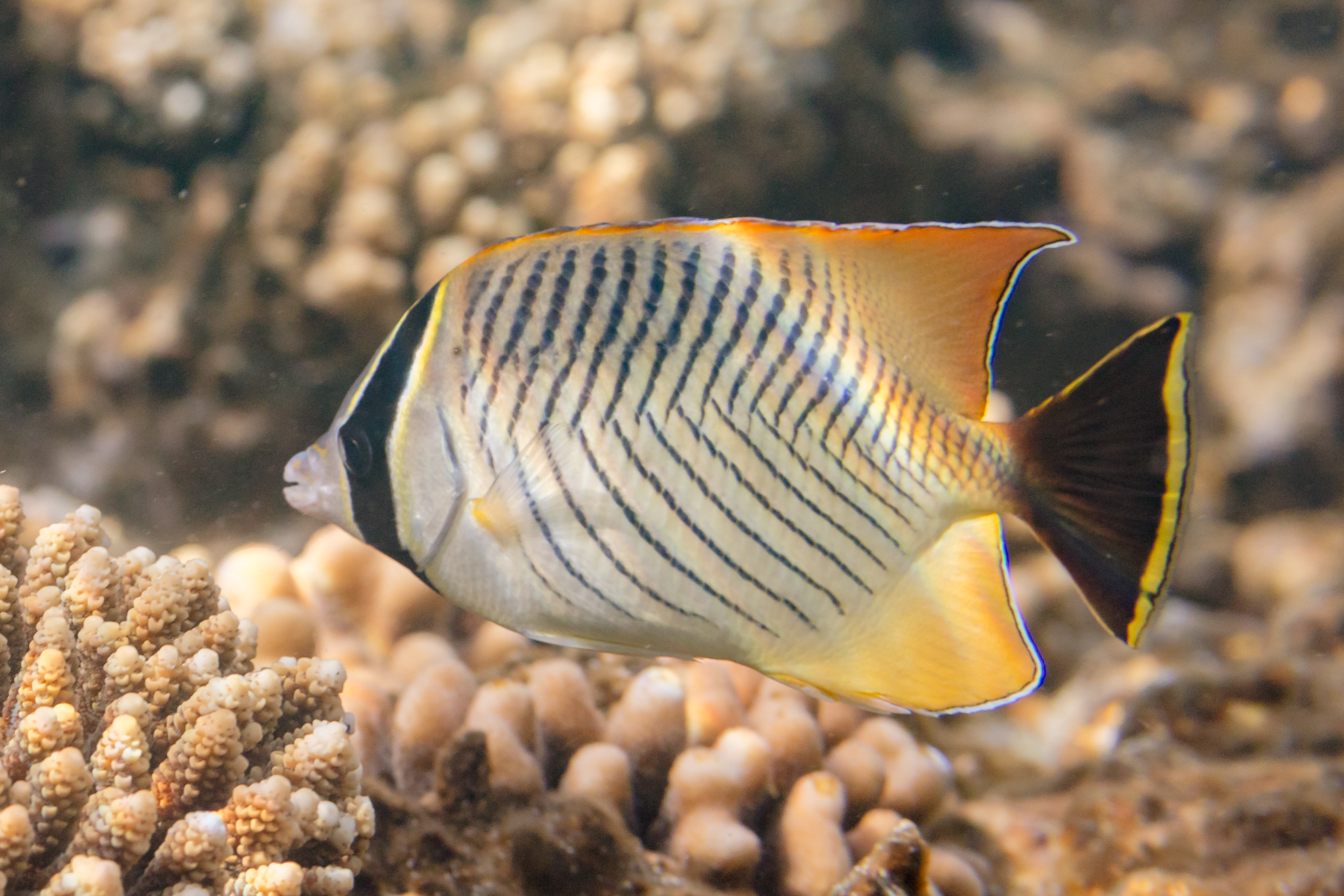
- Adult

Conservation status
- Near Threatened (IUCN 3.1)

Scientific classification
- Kingdom: Animalia
- Phylum: Chordata
- Class: Actinopterygii
- Division: Teleostei
- Order: Acanthuriformes
- Family: Chaetodontidae
- Genus: Chaetodon
- Subgenus: Chaetodon (Megaprotodon)
- Species: C. trifascialis

Binomial name
- Chaetodon trifascialis Quoy & Gaimard, 1825

Synonyms
- Megaprotodon trifascialis (Quoy & Gaimard, 1825); Chaetodon bifascialis Cuvier, 1829; Chaetodon triangularis Rüppell, 1829; Chaetodon strigangulus Cuvier, 1831; Megaprotodon strigangulus (Cuvier, 1831)

= Chevron butterflyfish =

Species of fish

The chevron butterflyfish (Chaetodon trifascialis), also known as chevroned butterflyfish, triangulate butterflyfish or V-lined butterflyfish, is a species of marine ray-finned fish, a butterflyfish belonging to the family Chaetodontidae. It has a wide Indo-Pacific distribution.

Chevron butterflyfish should not be confused with melon butterflyfish (Chaetodon trifasciatus), three-striped butterflyfish (Chaetodon tricinctus), or three-banded butterflyfish (Chaetodon robustus).

== Description ==
The chevron butterflyfish has a relatively elongate pale body marked with dark vertical chevron markings. It has a black tail with yellow posterior margin. There is a black band with pale edges which runs through the eye. The juveniles have a black vertical band which runs from the rear of the dorsal fin, over the rear of the body to the rear of the anal fins and they have a yellow tail base and pectoral fins. The dorsal fin contains 13–15 spines and 14–16 soft rays while the anal fin has 3–5 spines an 13–15 soft rays. This species attains a maximum total length of 18 centimetres (7.1 in).

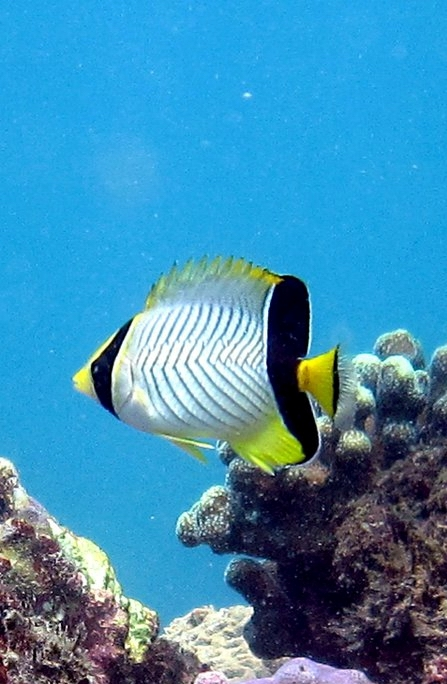
A juvenile chevron butterflyfish, demonstrating the colour difference compared to adult fish

== Distribution ==
The chevron butterflyfish has a wide Indo-Pacific distribution. It is found in the western Indian Ocean along the coast of East Africa from the Egypt south to South Africa and across the Indian Ocean including the Indian Ocean islands and into the Pacific Ocean to the Line Islands, Johnston Atoll and the Howland and Baker Islands in the central-west Pacific. It extends north to southern Japan and south to Lord Howe Island and Rapa Iti. In Australia this species can be found from the Houtman Abrolhos to Beagle Reef, as well as the Rowley Shoals and Scott Reef in Western Australia, it is then found in the northern Great Barrier Reef off Queensland, on some reefs in the Coral Sea, as far south as Arrawarra Headland near Coffs Harbour in New South Wales. It can also be found around the Australian Indian Ocean territories of Cocos (Keeling) Islands and Christmas Island.

== Habitat and biology ==
The chevron butterflyfish is a territorial species which occurs in semi-protected seaward and shallow lagoon reefs, closely associated with tabular and staghorn (Acropora) corals, the polyps and mucus of which they eat. They occur at depths ranging from 2–30 m. Adults are either seen to swim alone or (particularly in the breeding season) in pairs, while juveniles are secretive among coral branches. They are oviparous.

== Systematics ==
The chevron butterflyfish was first formally described in 1825 by the French naturalists Jean René Constant Quoy and Joseph Paul Gaimard with the type locality given as Guam. This species has the unusual features of age-dependent colour and an elongated outline, and this has led to this species being placed in a monotypic subgenus Megaprotodon. Its closest living relatives seem to be the species of the subgenera Discochaetodon (e.g. eightband butterflyfish, C. octofasciatus) and Tetrachaetodon (e.g. mirror butterflyfish, C. speculum). These, and perhaps other subgenera, would use Megaprotodon as genus name if Chaetodon is split up.
