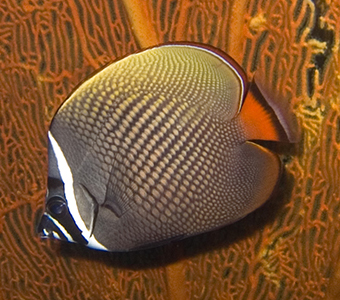

Conservation status
- Least Concern (IUCN 3.1)

Scientific classification
- Kingdom: Animalia
- Phylum: Chordata
- Class: Actinopterygii
- Order: Acanthuriformes
- Family: Chaetodontidae
- Genus: Chaetodon
- Subgenus: Chaetodon (Rabdophorus)
- Species: C. collare

Binomial name
- Chaetodon collare Bloch, 1787
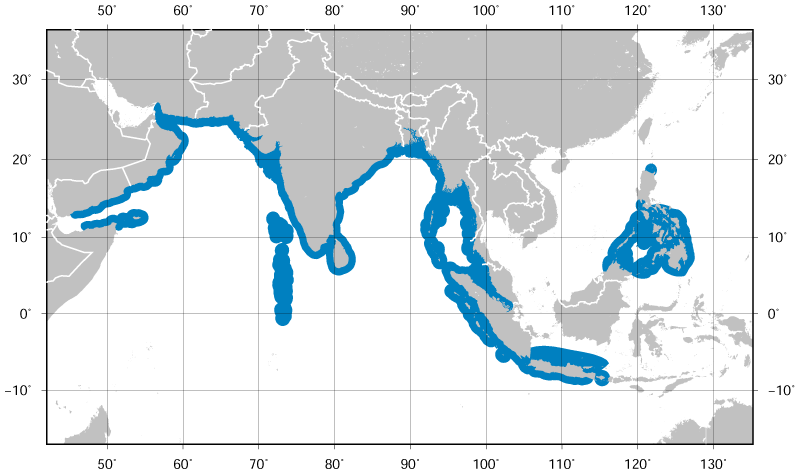
- Redtail butterflyfish range.

Synonyms
- Chaetodontops collare (Bloch, 1787); Chaetodon viridis Bleeker, 1845; Chaetodon praetextatus Cantor, 1849; Chaetodon parallelus Gronow, 1854; Chaetodon collare duplicicollis Ahl, 1923; Chaetodon fowleri Klausewitz, 1955

= Redtail butterflyfish =

Species of fish

The red-tailed butterflyfish (Chaetodon collare), also known as the brown butterflyfish, Pakistani butterflyfish or redtail butterflyfish, is a species of marine ray-finned fish, a butterflyfish belonging to the family Chaetodontidae.

It can be found in reefs of the Indo-west Pacific region: from the Persian Gulf and Maldives to Japan, the Philippines, and Indonesia. It usually swims at depths of between 3 and 15 m (10 and 50 ft).

It can grow to 18 cm (over 7 in) in length. The red-tailed butterflyfish is brown to black, with lighter scales giving it a spotted appearance. It has a prominent, vertical white streak behind the eyes, a dark stripe over the eyes, and another, smaller white stripe in front of the eyes. The base of the tail is bright red, followed by a black stripe. The tip of the tail is diffuse white.

In the wild, its diet consists of coral polyps. In captivity, it is a carnivore, taking fish meat and shrimp.

== Systematics ==
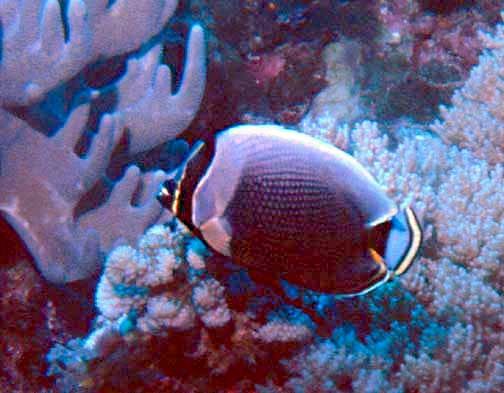
The mailed butterflyfish (C. reticulatus) – a case of convergent evolution?

It belongs to the large subgenus Rabdophorus which might warrant recognition as a distinct genus. In this group, its relationships are doubtful; it seems related to the "raccoon-masked" group including the black butterflyfish (C. flavirostris), diagonal butterflyfish (C. fasciatus), Philippine butterflyfish (C. adiergastos) and the raccoon butterflyfish (C. lunula). Its color and pattern is entirely different from these, but it shares the robust habitus and bold habits.

The mailed butterflyfish (C. reticulatus) is a near-match of C. collare in appearance, save for a less brown hue and light blue instead of red in its black-based tail. These two are widely sympatric in the western Pacific. However DNA sequence and osteology data overwhelmingly agree that C. reticulatus belongs to the subgenus called "Citharoedus" (a name preoccupied by a mollusc genus). This contains fish like the scrawled butterflyfish (C. meyeri), similar in shape and size but with a "finger-painted" pattern of a few prominent and uneven lines on a light silvery background.

If Rabdophorus were to be considered a distinct genus, "Citharoedus" would not be included in it but placed with the subgenera Lepidochaetodon or Megaprotodon. Thus, the red-tailed and mailed butterflyfishes probably represent a case of convergent evolution and perhaps mimicry. What selection forces were responsible for the striking similarity between two rather unrelated Chaetodon is not known.

The highly anomalous 12S rRNA mtDNA sequence found in this species in one 2007 study seems to be due to a laboratory error; in another study a 12S rRNA sequence agreeing with the general pattern of mtDNA evolution in Rabdophorus was found.
