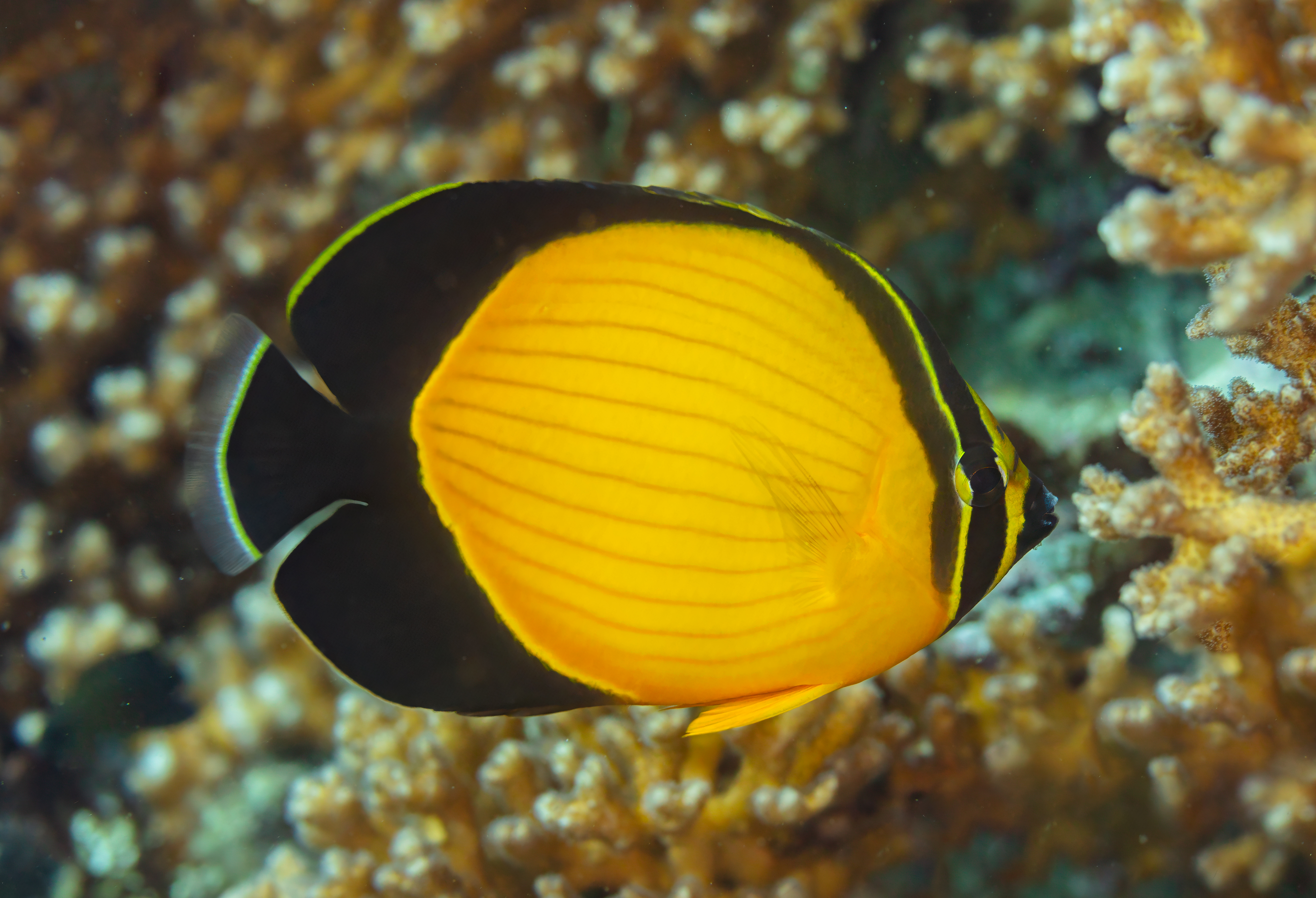

Conservation status
- Least Concern (IUCN 3.1) (Globally)

- Vulnerable (IUCN 3.1)(Persian Gulf)

Scientific classification
- Kingdom: Animalia
- Phylum: Chordata
- Class: Actinopterygii
- Order: Acanthuriformes
- Family: Chaetodontidae
- Genus: Chaetodon
- Subgenus: Chaetodon (Corallochaetodon)
- Species: C. melapterus

Binomial name
- Chaetodon melapterus Guichenot, 1863

Synonyms
- Chaetodon melanopterus Playfair, 1867; Chaetodon trifasciatus arabica Steindachner, 1899

= Chaetodon melapterus =

Species of fish

Chaetodon melapterus, the Arabian butterflyfish, blackfin butterflyfish or black-finned melon butterflyfish, is a species of marine ray-finned fish in the butterflyfish family Chaetodontidae. It is found in the northwestern Indian Ocean.

== Description ==
Save for the posterior edge, which is black, the body of Chaetodon melapterus is totally bright yellow. The dorsal, anal and caudal fins are also deep black. There are three vertical, black bands on the face, one on the snout around the mouth, one through the eye and one just behind the eye. The dorsal fin contains 13 spines and 19–21 soft rays while the anal fin has 3 spines and 18–19 soft rays. This species attains a maximum total length of 13 cm (5.1 in).

== Distribution ==
Chaetodon melapterus is found in the northwestern Indian Ocean, including the Persian Gulf, the southern coasts of the Arabian Peninsula (from the Gulf of Oman to the Gulf of Aden) and the southern part of the Red Sea.

== Habitat and biology ==
Chaetodon melapterus is found in shallow coastal reefs (at between 2 and 16 metres (7 and 52 ft)), and prefers areas with rich coral growth. This species lives in pairs, but there have been occasional records of aggregations. It is an obligate corallivore, feeding exclusively on polyps. It is an oviparous species which forms pairs to breed.

== Taxonomy ==
Chaetodon melapterus was first formally described in 1863 by the French zoologist Alphonse Guichenot with the type locality given as Réunion, although this is likely to be in error as the species has not been recorded from the Mascarenes. This species, together with the blacktail butterflyfish (C. austriacus), the melon butterflyfish (C. trifasciatus), and the oval butterflyfish (C. lunulatus), makes up the subgenus Corallochaetodon. This group is probably quite closely related to the subgenus "Citharoedus" (the name is a junior homonym of a mollusc genus), which (among a few other species) contains the scrawled butterflyfish (C. meyeri). These subgenera may be moved into Megaprotodon if Chaetodon were to be split up.

== Relationship with humans ==
Chaetodon melapterus is unsuitable for keeping in aquaria due to its specialized diet of coral. Despite this, it makes an occasional appearance in the trade.
