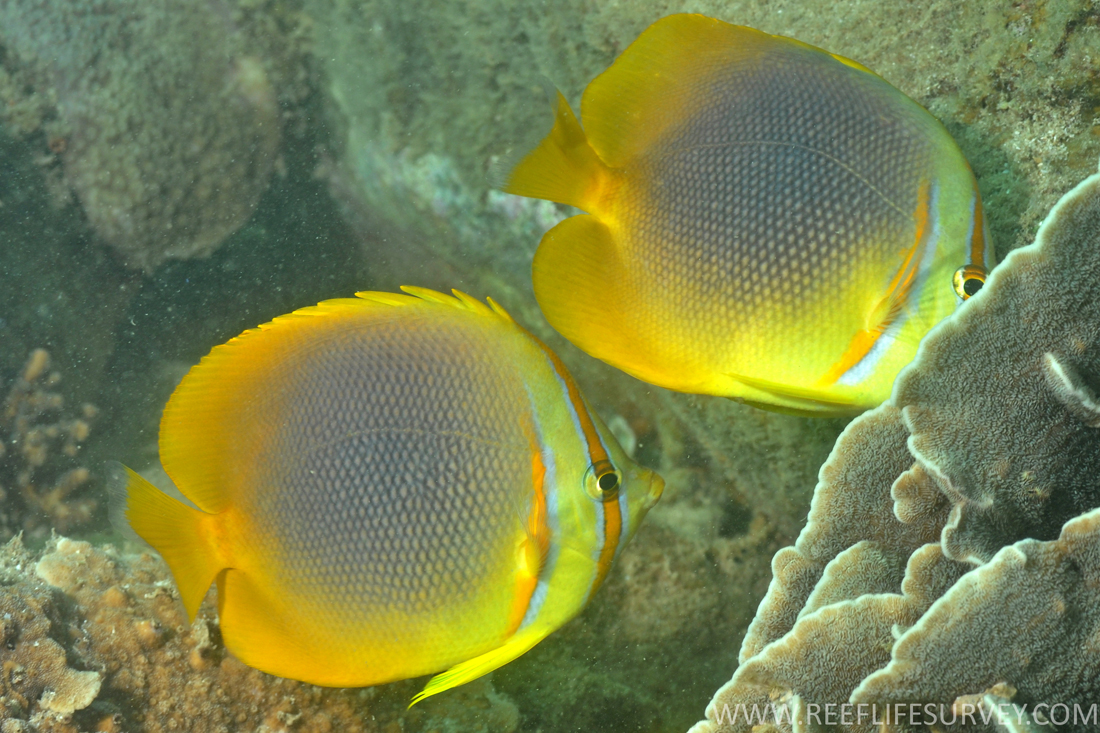

Conservation status
- Least Concern (IUCN 3.1)

Scientific classification
- Kingdom: Animalia
- Phylum: Chordata
- Class: Actinopterygii
- Order: Acanthuriformes
- Family: Chaetodontidae
- Genus: Chaetodon
- Subgenus: Chaetodon (Discochaetodon)
- Species: C. aureofasciatus

Binomial name
- Chaetodon aureofasciatus Macleay, 1878

= Chaetodon aureofasciatus =

Species of fish

Chaetodon aureofasciatus, the golden butterflyfish, golden-banded butterflyfish, golden-striped butterflyfish or sunburst butterflyfish, is a species of marine ray-finned fish, a butterflyfish belonging to the family Chaetodontidae. This coral eating species is found on shallow reefs in the western Pacific Ocean.

== Description ==
Chaetodon aureofasciatus has a whitish body which is cross-hatched with darker lines, creating a purple hue. The caudal, anal, dorsal and pelvic fins are yellow. There is an orange vertical band, edges with black, running through the eyeblack edged orange band through the eyes and just behind the head there is another, thin vertical orange band of the head. The dorsal fin contains 11 spines and 20–22 soft rays, while the anal fin has 3 spines and 17–18 soft rays. This species attains a maximum total length of 12.5 centimetres (4.9 in).

== Distribution ==
Chaetodon aureofasciatusis is found in the south western Pacific Ocean. Its range encompasses northern Australia where it is found from Coral Bay in Western Australia to Moreton Bay in Queensland. It is also found in southern Papua New Guinea.

== Habitat and biology ==
Chaetodon aureofasciatus is found on coastal and offshore reefs, frequently on silty coastal reefs, even those near the mouths of rivers and this species is able to withstand high percentages of freshwater. It is found at depths of 1 to 20 metres (3.3 to 65.6 ft) and they are encountered as pairs or in small groups. This species is an obligate corallivore, feeding on coral polyps, but can persist in areas of relatively sparse coral growth. It has been observed that this species has seemingly developed a wide diet than other corallivorous butterflyfishes, possibly in response to coral declines and that this may also account for their move into brackish water.

== Systematics ==
Chaetodon aureofasciatus was first formally described in 1878 by the Scottish-Australian politician, naturalist, zoologist, and herpetologist William John Macleay (1820–1891) with the type locality given as Darwin, Northern Territory. This species is a close relative of the eightband butterflyfish (C. octofasciatus) and less close to Rainford's butterflyfish (C. rainfordi). It is probably also closely related to the three-striped butterflyfish (C. tricinctus) and these diverse but always high-bodied species make up the subgenus Discochaetodon, of which C. octofasciatus is the type species. They appear to be close relatives of the subgenus Tetrachaetodon which includes for example the mirror butterflyfish (C. speculum) and together with these would probably go in the proposed genus Megaprotodon if Chaetodon is split up. The golden butterflyfish is known to hybridise with Rainford's butterflyfish.

== Use ==
Chaetodon aureofasciatus is occasionally collected for the aquarium trade but it is regarded as difficult to maintain in captivity.
