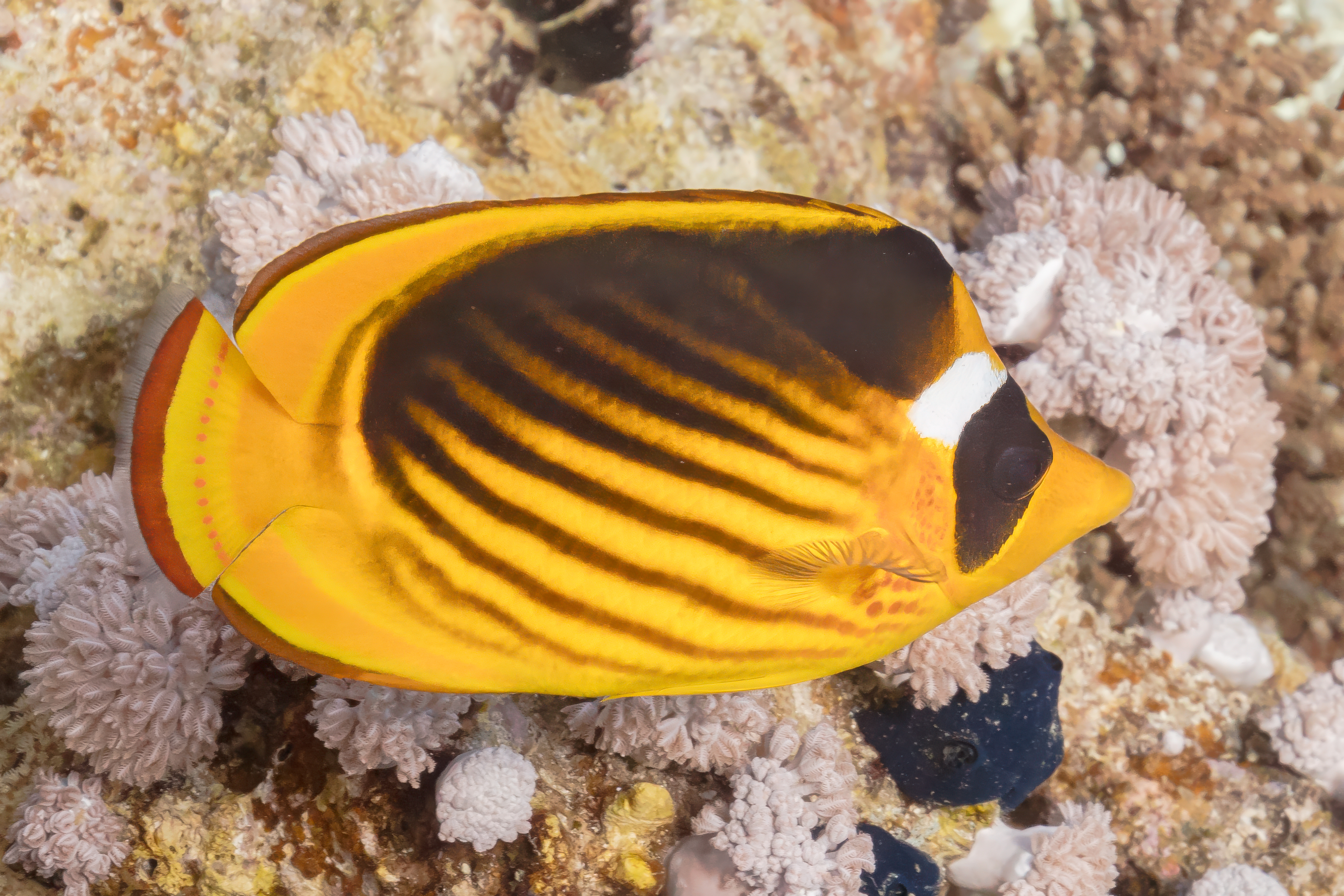

Conservation status
- Least Concern (IUCN 3.1)

Scientific classification
- Kingdom: Animalia
- Phylum: Chordata
- Class: Actinopterygii
- Division: Teleostei
- Order: Acanthuriformes
- Family: Chaetodontidae
- Genus: Chaetodon
- Subgenus: Chaetodon (Rabdophorus)
- Species: C. fasciatus

Binomial name
- Chaetodon fasciatus Forsskål, 1775

Synonyms
- Rabdophorus linophora fasciatus (Forsskål, 1775); Chaetodon flavus Bloch & Schneider, 1801

= Diagonal butterflyfish =

Species of fish

The diagonal butterflyfish (Chaetodon fasciatus), also known as the Red Sea raccoon butterflyfish, is a species of marine ray-finned fish, a butterflyfish belonging to the family Chaetodontidae. It is found in the Red Sea and western Indian Ocean.

== Description ==
The diagonal butterflyfish has a yellow body marked with 11 diagonal stripes. On the head there is a vertical black band through the eye and an incomplete white band on the forehead. The dorsal, anal, and caudal fins are yellow. This species attains a maximum total length of 22 centimetres (8.7 in).

== Distribution ==
The diagonal butterflyfish is found in the northwestern Indian Ocean. It has been recorded from the Red Sea and the Gulf of Aden south as far as Kenya.

== Habitat and biology ==
Diagonal butterflyfish are found over and around corals, on which they feed. They have also been observed feeding on gelatinous zooplankton, such as jellyfish (Scyphozoa) and comb jellies (Ctenophora).

== Systematics ==
The diagonal butterflyfish was first formally described in 1775 by the Swedish speaking Finnish born naturalist Peter Forsskål (1732–1763) with the type locality given as Jeddah. It belongs to the large subgenus Rabdophorus which might warrant recognition as a distinct genus. In this group, its closest relative is probably the very similar common raccoon butterflyfish (C. lunula). Other close relatives appear to be the black butterflyfish (C. flavirostris), Philippine butterflyfish (C. adiergastos), and perhaps also the unusual red-tailed butterflyfish (C. collare). Although the coloration of this group varies, they are all largish butterflyfishes with an oval outline, and most have a pattern of ascending oblique stripes on the flanks. Except in the red-tailed butterflyfish, there is at least a vestigial form of the "raccoon" mask, with a white space between the dark crown and eye areas.
