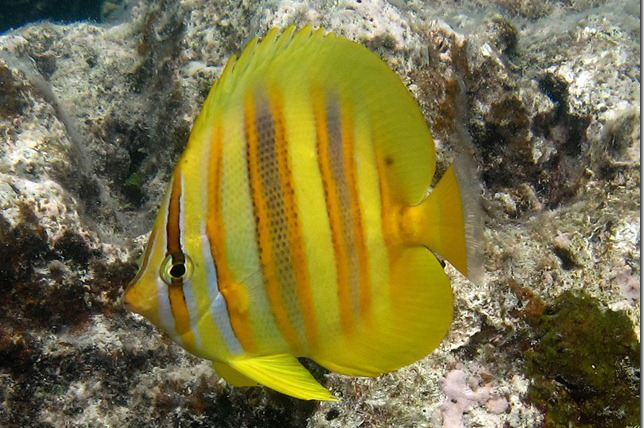

Conservation status
- Near Threatened (IUCN 3.1)

Scientific classification
- Kingdom: Animalia
- Phylum: Chordata
- Class: Actinopterygii
- Division: Teleostei
- Order: Acanthuriformes
- Family: Chaetodontidae
- Genus: Chaetodon
- Subgenus: Chaetodon (Discochaetodon)
- Species: C. rainfordi

Binomial name
- Chaetodon rainfordi McCulloch, 1923

= Chaetodon rainfordi =

Species of fish

Chaetodon rainfordi, Rainfords's butterflyfish, also known as the gold-barred butterflyfish or the Northern butterflyfish, is a species of marine ray-finned fish, a butterflyfish, belonging to the family Chaetodontidae. It is found in the southwestern Pacific Ocean where it is associated with coral reefs.

== Description ==
Chaetodon rainfordi may be distinguished by its colour compared to related species of fish. The basic colour of yellow with an orange bar, with dark edges, which runs through the eye and another thinner orange bar which goes through the base of the pectoral fin. There are then two blue-grey bands edged with yellow-orange on the body. There is normally a black spot on the caudal peduncle. The gold bands on the body often found on each side of the wider diffuse dark bars. The dorsal, anal and pectoral fins are yellow. The dorsal fin contains 10–11 spines and 20–22 soft rays while the anal fin has 3 spines and 17–19 soft rays. This species attains a maximum total length of 15 centimetres (5.9 in).

== Distribution ==
Chaetodon rainfordi is found in the south western Pacific Ocean. It is found off southern Papua New Guinea, along the Great Barrier Reef off Queensland, south to the Solitary Islands and the Surgeons Reef off Red Rock, New South Wales. It is also found off Lord Howe Island in the Tasman Sea.

== Habitat and biology ==
Chaetodon rainfordi lives among coastal and offshore reefs, at depths between 5 and 20 metres (16 and 66 ft), where there is a sparse growth of corals. The juveniles live among branching corals. It is an obligate corallivore, feeding only on coral polyps. It is an oviparous species which forms pairs for breeding.

== Systematics ==
Chaetodon rainfordi was first formally described in 1923 by the Australian ichthyologist Allan Riverstone McCulloch (1885–1925) with the type locality given as Holbourne Island, off Port Denison, Queensland. The specific name honours the amateur naturalist and viticulturist with the Queensland Agricultural Department, Edward Henry Rainford who provided specimens of fish for the Australian Museum, including type of this species. This species is a close relative of the golden butterflyfish (C. aureofasciatus) and the eightband butterflyfish (C. octofasciatus). These species, together with the three-striped butterflyfish (C. tricinctus), are high-bodied species which make up the subgenus Discochaetodon, of which C. octofasciatus is the type species. They appear to be close relatives of the subgenus Tetrachaetodon which includes for example the mirror butterflyfish (C. speculum) and together with these would probably go in Megaprotodon if Chaetodon is split up.

== Utilisation and threats ==
Chaetodon rainfordi is rarely found in the aquarium trade but it is difficult to keep in the aquarium due to its specialised diet. This species relies on coral for food and there have been severe depletion of numbers where there has been climate-induced coral die offs. Its inshore habitat is also being lost where sedimentation caused by anthropogenic activities on land. In some places, it has become locally extinct. The IUCN classifies this species as Near Threatened.
