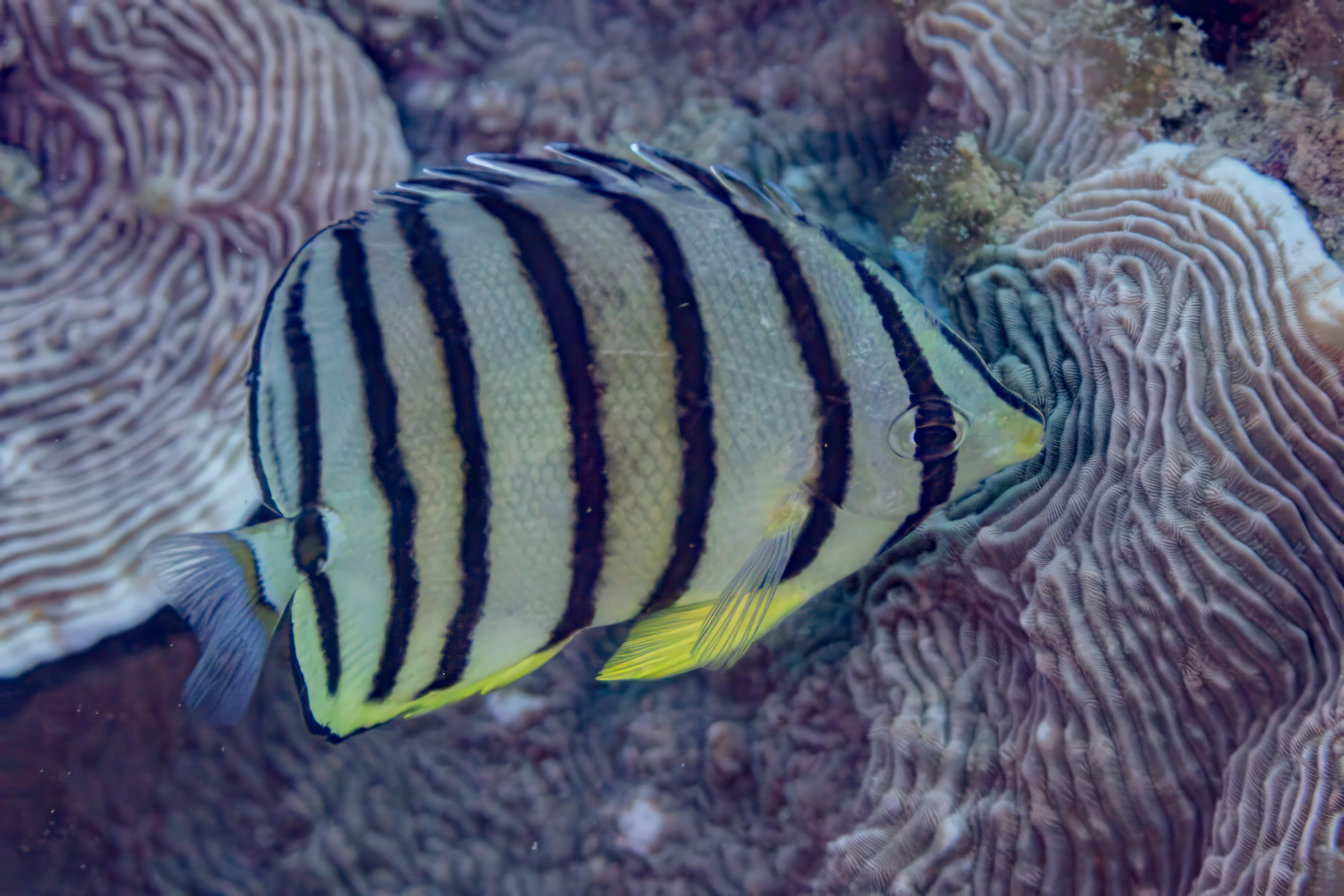

Conservation status
- Least Concern (IUCN 3.1)

Scientific classification
- Kingdom: Animalia
- Phylum: Chordata
- Class: Actinopterygii
- Division: Teleostei
- Order: Acanthuriformes
- Family: Chaetodontidae
- Genus: Chaetodon
- Subgenus: Chaetodon (Discochaetodon)
- Species: C. octofasciatus

Binomial name
- Chaetodon octofasciatus Bloch, 1787

Synonyms
- Tetragonopterus octofasciatus (Bloch, 1787); Chaetodon octolineatus Gronow, 1854

= Eightband butterflyfish =

Species of fish

The eight-banded butterflyfish (Chaetodon octofasciatus), also known as the eightband butterflyfish or eight-striped butterflyfish, is a species of marine ray-finned fish, a butterflyfish belonging to the family Chaetodontidae. It is found in the Indo-Pacific region where it is associated with reefs.

== Description ==
The eightband butterflyfish has a flat, circular disk-shaped body with a slightly pointed snout. The body is white turning yellowish towards the belly and is marked with 7 black stripes over the head and the flanks. One runs centrally along the snout and another as a clear black margin to the dorsal and anal fins. The third line reaches on to the pelvic fin. All of the fins are yellow. There is a white ringed black spot on the caudal peduncle. Some specimens have black or brownish horizontal bars connecting the rear pairs of vertical bars. The background colour is also dependent on the environment inhabited by the fish, with paler, creamier fish in clear waters over coral reefs and the yellower fish being associated with less clear water coloured green by algae near river mouths. There are 10–12 spines and 17–19 soft rays in the dorsal fin while the anal fin has 3–4 spines and 14–17 soft rays. This relatively small species of butterflyfish attains a maximum total length of 12 centimetres (4.7 in).

== Distribution ==
The eightband butterflyfish is found in the eastern Indian Ocean and the western Pacific Ocean from the Maldives, India and Sri Lanka east to the Solomon Islands, north to southern Japan and south to the Scott Reef in Western Australia.

== Habitat and biology ==
The eightband butterflyfish is found at depths between3 and 20 metres (9.8 and 65.6 ft) in coral reefs. Adults swim in pairs in coral-rich areas of sheltered inshore and lagoon reefs; juveniles can often be seen in groups among Acropora corals. This species feeds exclusively on coral polyps.

== Systematics ==
The eightband butterflyfish was first formally described in 1787 by the German zoologist Marcus Elieser Bloch (1723–1799) with the type locality given as the INdian Ocean. It is a close relative of the golden butterflyfish (C. aureofasciatus) and less close to Rainford's butterflyfish (C. rainfordi). Alongside the three-striped Butterflyfish (C. tricinctus), these diverse but always high-bodied species make up the subgenus Discochaetodon, of which C. octofasciatus is the type species. They appear to be close relatives of the subgenus Tetrachaetodon which includes for example the mirror butterflyfish (C. speculum) and together with these would probably go in Megaprotodon if Chaetodon is split up.

== Utilisation ==
The eightband butterflyfish is occasionally traded in the aquarium trade but as an obligate corallivore it is difficult to maintain in the aquarium and they frequently starve.
