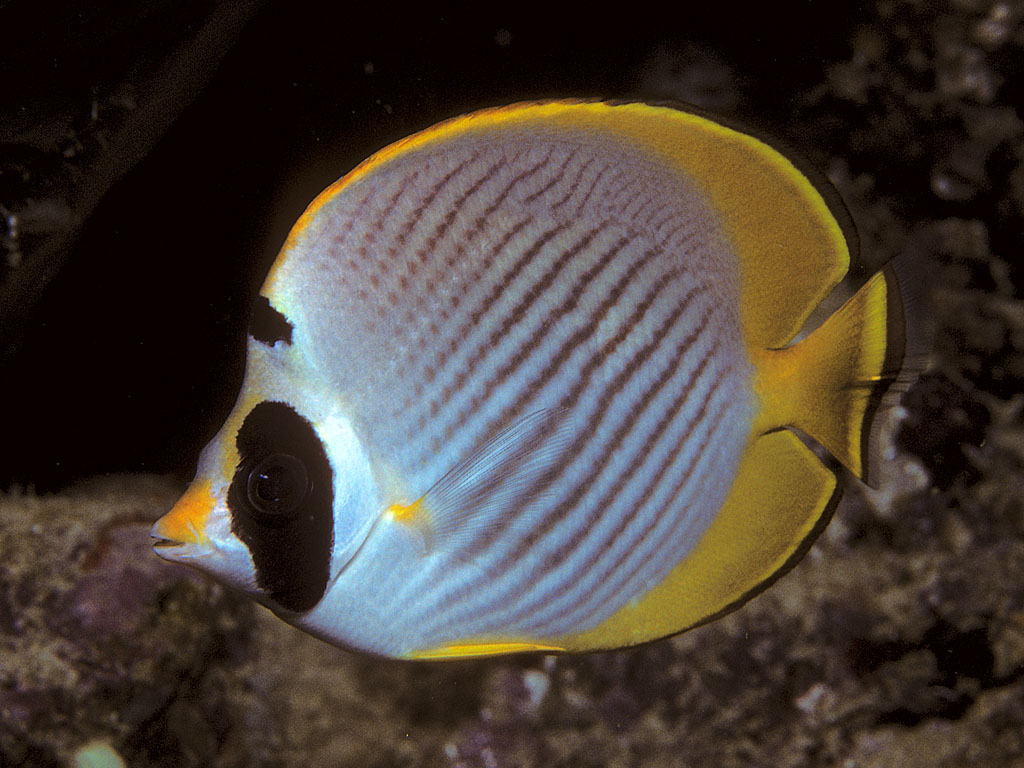

Conservation status
- Least Concern (IUCN 3.1)

Scientific classification
- Kingdom: Animalia
- Phylum: Chordata
- Class: Actinopterygii
- Division: Teleostei
- Order: Acanthuriformes
- Family: Chaetodontidae
- Genus: Chaetodon
- Subgenus: Chaetodon (Rabdophorus)
- Species: C. adiergastos

Binomial name
- Chaetodon adiergastos Seale, 1910

= Philippine butterflyfish =

Species of fish

The Philippine butterflyfish or threadfin butterflyfish (Chaetodon adiergastos), the Bantayan butterflyfish or panda butterflyfish, is a species of marine ray-finned fish, a butterflyfish belonging to the family Chaetodontidae. It is found in the western Pacific, from the Ryukyu Islands and Taiwan to Java and northwestern Australia.

It grows to a maximum length of 20 cm (nearly 8 in). The body is white with diagonal brown stripes on the sides. The dorsal, caudal, anal and pelvic fins are yellow. There are rounded broad black bands on the face, covering the eye, but not continuous from one side of the body to the other but with a separate black spot centered on the forehead.

The Philippine butterflyfish was first formally described in 1910 by the American ichthyologist Alvin Seale (1871–1958) with the type locality given as Bantayan Island in the Philippines. It belongs to the large subgenus Rabdophorus which might warrant recognition as a distinct genus. In this group, it appears to belong to a loose group including such species as the black butterflyfish (C. flavirostris), diagonal butterflyfish (C. fasciatus), raccoon butterflyfish (C. lunula) and perhaps also the unusual red-tailed butterflyfish (C. collare). Although the coloration of this group varies quite a lot, they are all largish butterflyfishes with an oval outline, and most have a pattern of ascending oblique stripes on the flanks. Except in the red-tailed butterflyfish, there is at least a vestigial form of the "raccoon" mask, with a white space between the dark crown and eye areas.

The Philippine butterflyfish is found in coral reefs at depths of 1–30 m and occurs in pairs or groups, usually near soft coral. Juveniles are solitary and found on shallow protected reefs or in estuaries.
