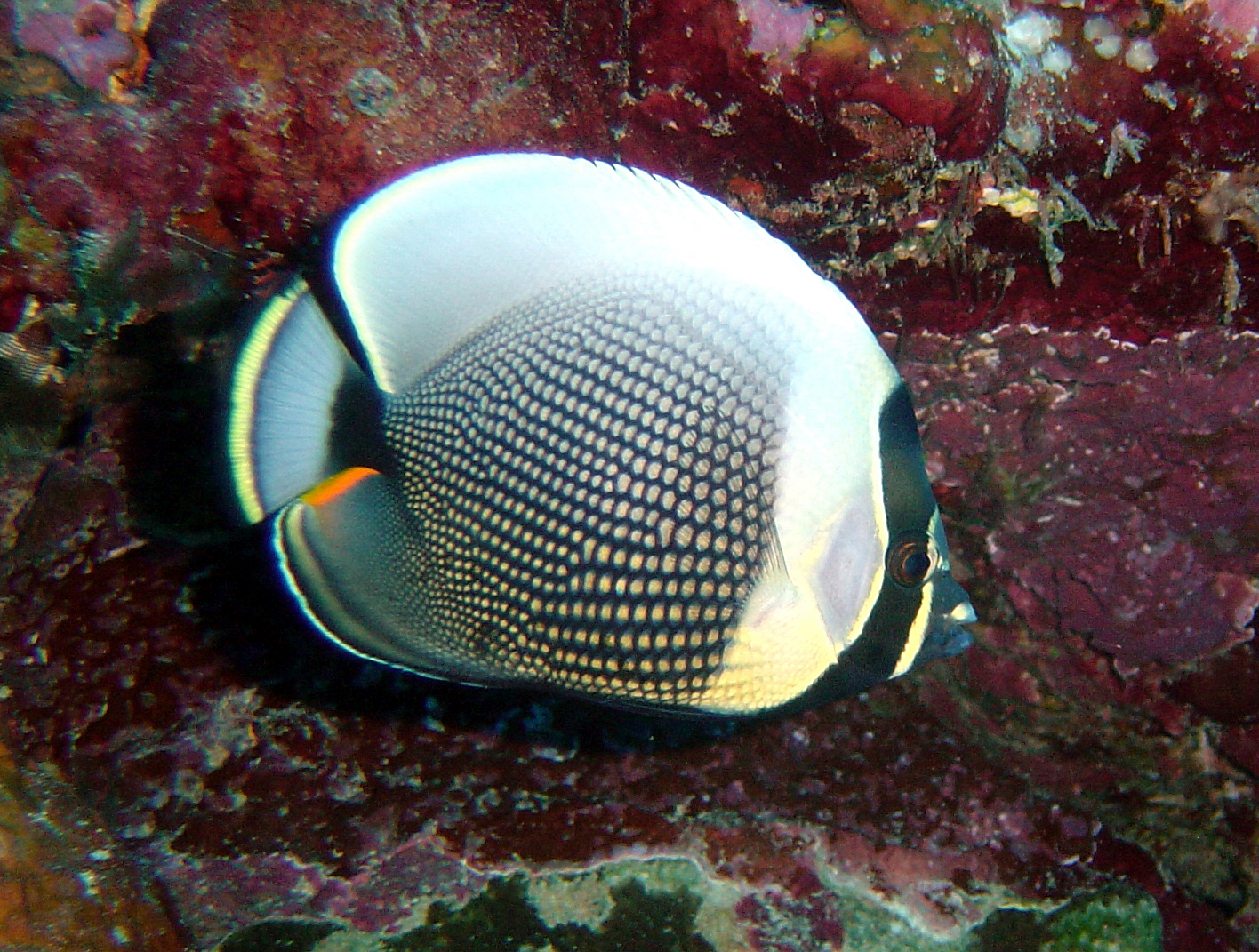

Conservation status
- Data Deficient (IUCN 3.1)

Scientific classification
- Kingdom: Animalia
- Phylum: Chordata
- Class: Actinopterygii
- Division: Teleostei
- Order: Acanthuriformes
- Family: Chaetodontidae
- Genus: Chaetodon
- Subgenus: Chaetodon (Citharoedus)
- Species: C. reticulatus

Binomial name
- Chaetodon reticulatus G. Cuvier, 1831

Synonyms
- Citharoedus reticulatus (Cuvier, 1831); Chaetodon superbus Broussonet, 1831; Chaetodon superbus Lesson, 1831

= Mailed butterflyfish =

Species of fish

The mailed butterflyfish (Chaetodon reticulatus), also known as the reticulated butterflyfish or black butterflyfish, is a species of marine ray-finned fish, a butterflyfish belonging to the family Chaetodontidae, This species is found on reefs in the central and western Pacific Ocean. It can be found in the aquarium trade.

== Description ==
The mailed butterflyfish is a relatively dull-coloured species of butterflyfish and it has a mainly blackish body with light grey centres to the scales and a pale back. It has a broad vertical band with yellow edges which runs through the eye with a broad, white vertical band behind that. The dorsal fin is white, the anal fin. The caudal peduncle is black, while the caudal fin is whitish blue with a yellow band on the margin which itself has a black submargin. The tail of juveniles is transparent. The dorsal fin has 12–13 spines and 23–29 soft rays, while the anal fin has 3 spines and 20–22 soft rays. This species attains a maximum total length of 18 centimetres (7.1 in).

== Distribution ==
The mailed butterflyfish has a wide distribution in the western central Pacific, and it is found from Taiwan and the Philippines through Polynesia as far as Hawaii, the Marquesas Islands and the Pitcairn Islands. It extends north as far as the Ryukyu Islands south to New Caledonia. In Australia, it is found on the Great Barrier Reef with juveniles as far south as the Solitary Islands.

== Habitat and biology ==
The mailed butterflyfish is a relatively common species of exposed seaward reefs, but it may also be found in sheltered lagoon areas, where there is a rich growth of corals and clear water. The juveniles prefer more protected waters than the adults. It is normally encountered in pairs, but schools have been recorded. These fish live at depths between 1 and 30 metres (3.3 and 98.4 ft) and are obligate corallivores that feed mainly on the species in the genus Acropora. This species is oviparous and they breed in monogamous pairs.

== Taxonomy ==
The mailed butterflyfish was first formally species description in 1831 by the French anatomist Georges Cuvier, with the type locality given as Tahiti. It is a close relative of the ornate butterflyfish (C. ornatissimus) and the scrawled butterflyfish (C. meyeri). Together they make up the subgenus called "Citharoedus", but as this name had already been used for the mollusc genus when given to the fish, it is invalid. They are probably close to the subgenus Corallochaetodon, which contains the melon butterflyfish (C. trifasciatus). Like these, they might be separated into Megaprotodon if the genus Chaetodon is split up.

== Utilisation ==
The mailed butterflyfish occasionally appears in the aquarium trade but its specialised diet means that captive specimens frequently starve to death.
