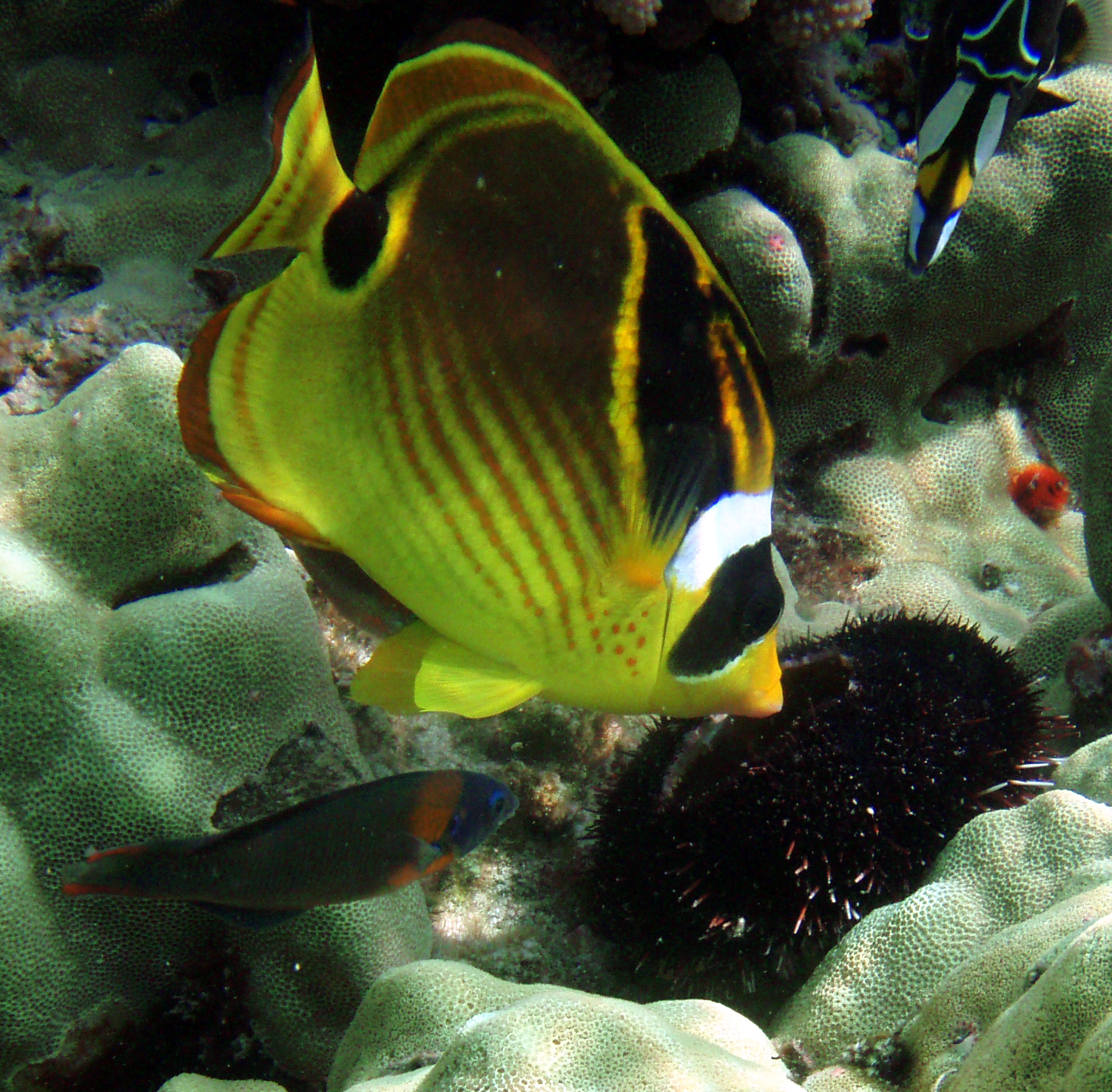
- Off Kona (Hawaiʻi), feeding on a sea urchin while a saddle wrasse, Thalassoma duperrey (lower left), waits for morsels

Conservation status
- Least Concern (IUCN 3.1)

Scientific classification
- Kingdom: Animalia
- Phylum: Chordata
- Class: Actinopterygii
- Division: Teleostei
- Order: Acanthuriformes
- Family: Chaetodontidae
- Genus: Chaetodon
- Subgenus: Chaetodon (Rabdophorus)
- Species: C. lunula

Binomial name
- Chaetodon lunula (Lacépède, 1802)

Synonyms
- Pomacentrus lunula Lacepède, 1802; Chaetodontops lunula (Lacepède, 1802); Tetragonoptrus lunula (Lacepède, 1802); Chaetodon biocellatus Cuvier, 1831; Tetragonoptrus biocellatus (Cuvier, 1831)

= Raccoon butterflyfish =

Species of fish

The raccoon butterflyfish (Chaetodon lunula), also known as the crescent-masked butterflyfish, lunule butterflyfish, halfmoon butterflyfish, moon butterflyfish, raccoon butterfly, raccoon, raccoon coralfish, and redstriped butterflyfish, is a species of marine ray-finned fish, a butterflyfish belonging to the family Chaetodontidae. It is found in the Indian and Pacific Oceans.

== Taxonomy ==
Chaetodon lunula was first formally described as Pomacentrus lunula in 1802 by the french naturalist Bernard Germain de Lacépède (1756–1825) with the type locality given as "the Indian Ocean". It belongs to the large subgenus Rabdophorus which might warrant recognition as a distinct genus. In this group, its closest relative is probably the very similar Red Sea raccoon butterflyfish or diagonal butterflyfish, C. fasciatus. Other close relatives appear to be the black butterflyfish, C. flavirostris), Philippine butterflyfish, C. adiergastos, and perhaps also the unusual redtail butterflyfish, C. collare. Although the coloration of this group varies greatly, they are all largish butterflyfishes with an oval outline, and most have a pattern of ascending oblique stripes on the flanks. Except in the red-tailed butterflyfish, there is at least a vestigial form of the "raccoon" mask, with a white space between the dark crown and eye areas.

== Description ==
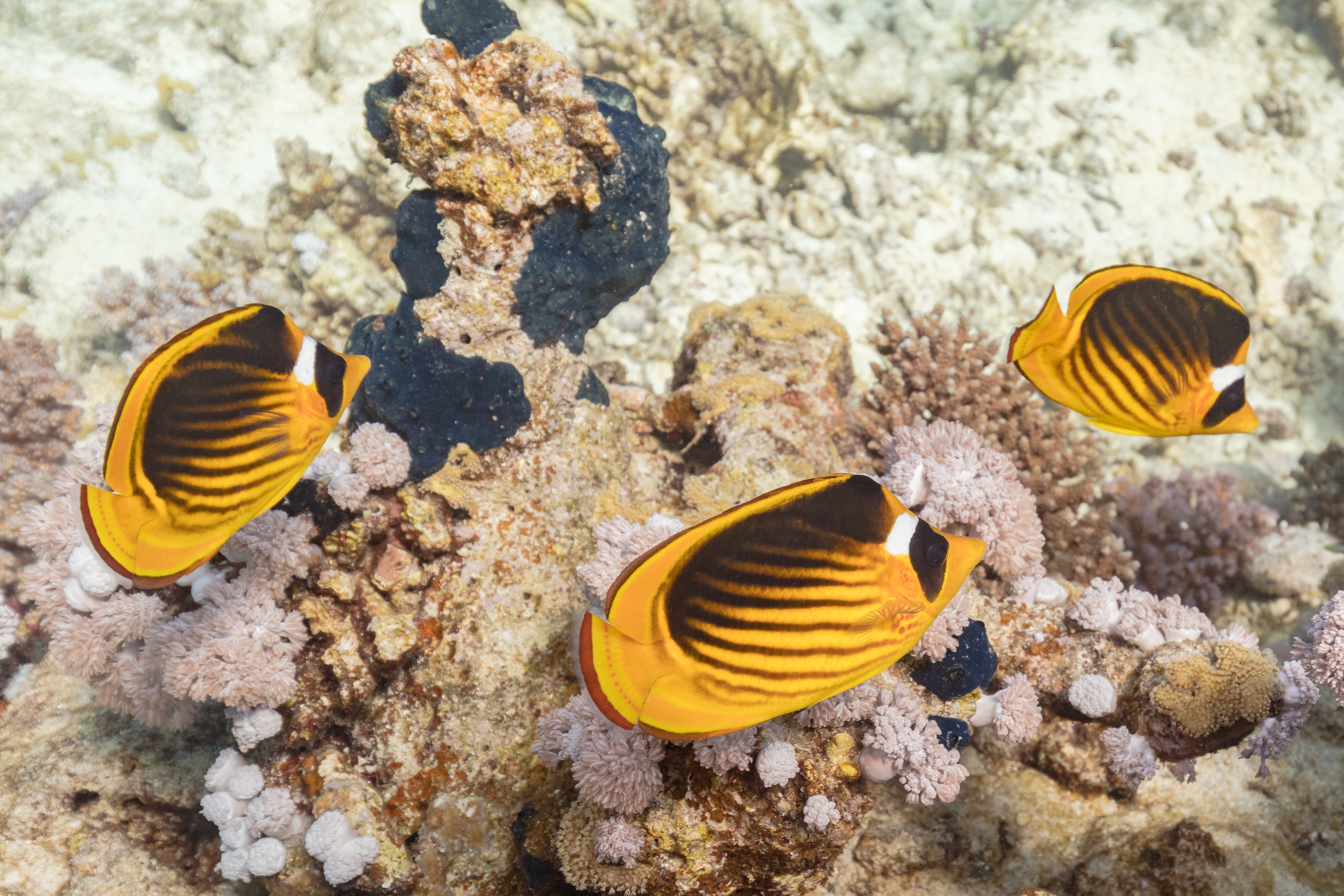
Group of the related Chaetodon fasciatus in the Red Sea

Chaetodon lunula can reach a length of 20 cm (nearly 8 in). These large butterflyfishes have an oval outline, with a pattern of ascending oblique reddish stripes on the flanks and black and white bands over the face and eyes, similar to the "raccoon" mask (hence the common name). They show a black spot on the caudal peduncle and oblique yellow stripes behind the head. They have 10–14 dorsal spines and 3 anal spines.

== Biology ==
Chaetodon lunula is a nocturnal species that usually lives in small groups. Adults feed mainly on nudibranchs and small invertebrates, but also on algae and coral polyps.

== Distribution ==
This species can be found widely throughout the tropical Indo-Pacific region (East Africa to the Hawaiian and Marquesan islands, north to southern Japan) and in the southeast Atlantic (South Africa).

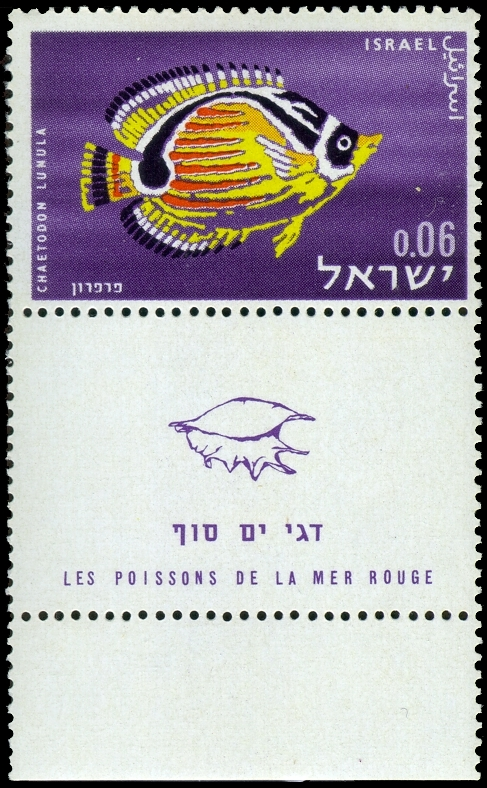
Israeli postal stamp, 1962

== Habitat ==
This species prefers seaward reefs and shallow reef flats of lagoon, at a depth of over 30 m.

== In the aquarium ==
The raccoon butterflyfish is generally not aggressive towards other fish, with the exception of lionfish and triggerfish. In captivity, the typical lifespan of a raccoon butterflyfish is five to seven years. It has been observed as a beneficial predator of Aiptasia and Majano sea anemones. They will eliminate this nuisance pest within a two- to six-week period depending on the anemone population and size of the tank; however, they will eagerly feed on any soft corals and may cause more harm than good to the decoration. In a confined environment, this species is prone to succumbing to "marine ich", infection by the ciliate Cryptocaryon irritans.
