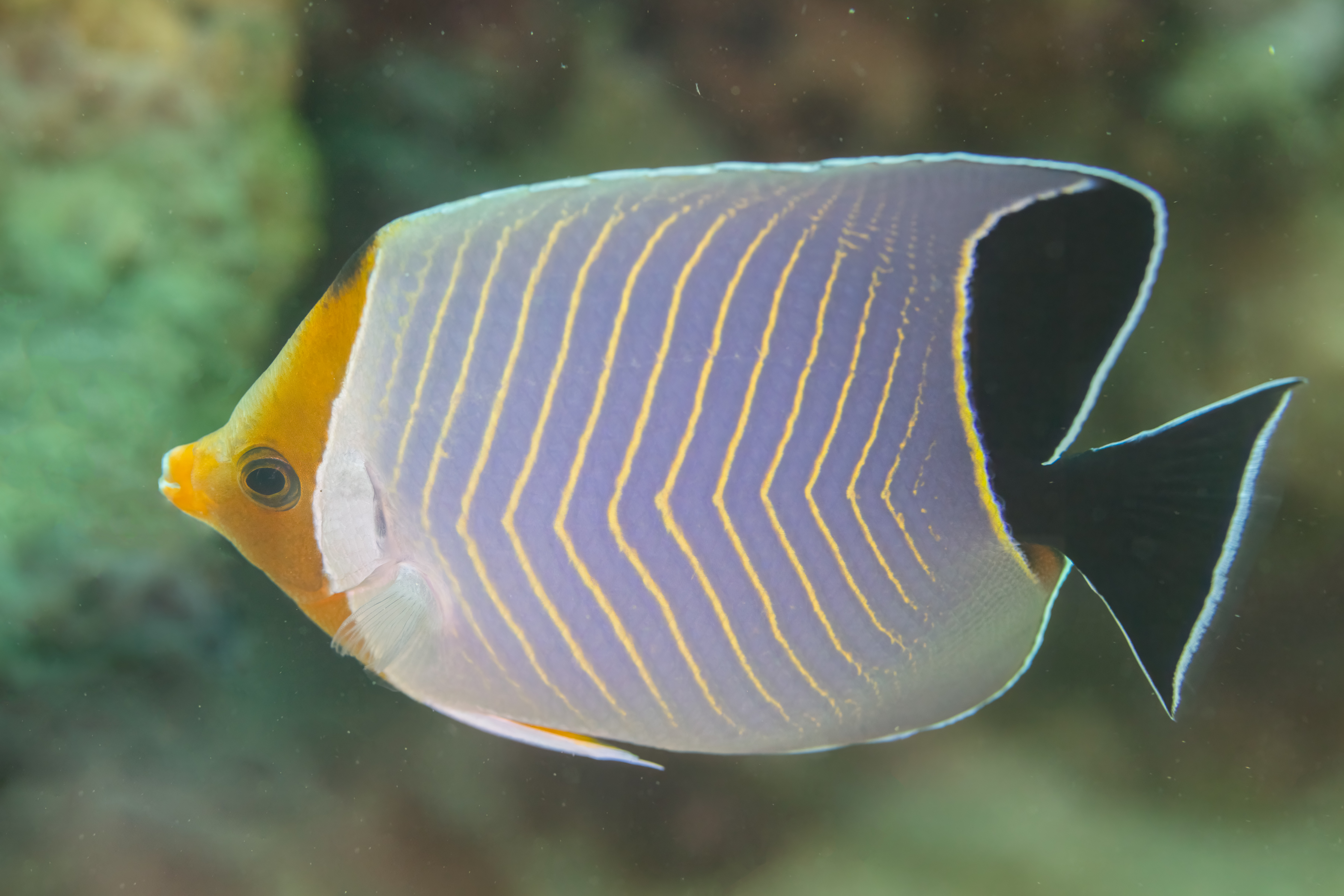

Conservation status
- Least Concern (IUCN 3.1)

Scientific classification
- Kingdom: Animalia
- Phylum: Chordata
- Class: Actinopterygii
- Order: Acanthuriformes
- Family: Chaetodontidae
- Genus: Chaetodon
- Subgenus: Chaetodon (Gonochaetodon)
- Species: C. larvatus

Binomial name
- Chaetodon larvatus G. Cuvier, 1831

Synonyms
- Chaetodon karraf Cuvier, 1831

= Chaetodon larvatus =

Species of fish

Chaetodon larvatus, commonly known as the hooded butterflyfish or orangeface butterflyfish (and with many other common names), is a species of marine ray-finned fish, a butterflyfish belonging to the family Chaetodontidae. It is found in the Red Sea and Gulf of Aden and has been recorded twice recently in the eastern Mediterranean Sea off Israel and Syria.

== Description ==
It grows to a maximum size of 12 cm (4.7 in) total length. The body is powder blue in colour with a pattern of narrow, white chevron-shaped bars. The head and front of the body are coloured intense red-orange. The back of the dorsal fin and the caudal fin are black.

== Ecology and behaviour ==
The hooded butterflyfish is found in seaward and lagoon coral reefs. They usually swim around in pairs and are territorial. Normally this species feeds exclusively on the polyps of the tubular Acropora corals. However, given that it has been observed in the Mediterranean, where coral growth is limited, it may be able to adapt to a different diet.

== Phylogeny ==
The hooded butterflyfish is a far western sister species of the triangle butterflyfish (C. triangulum), which lives in the Indian Ocean, and C. baronessa, which inhabits the Indo-Pacific. Together these species form the subgenus Gonochaetodon. If Chaetodon is split up as some researchers propose, this group might go into Megaprotodon with other high-backed and square-bodied species, but its exact relationships are still not well known.
