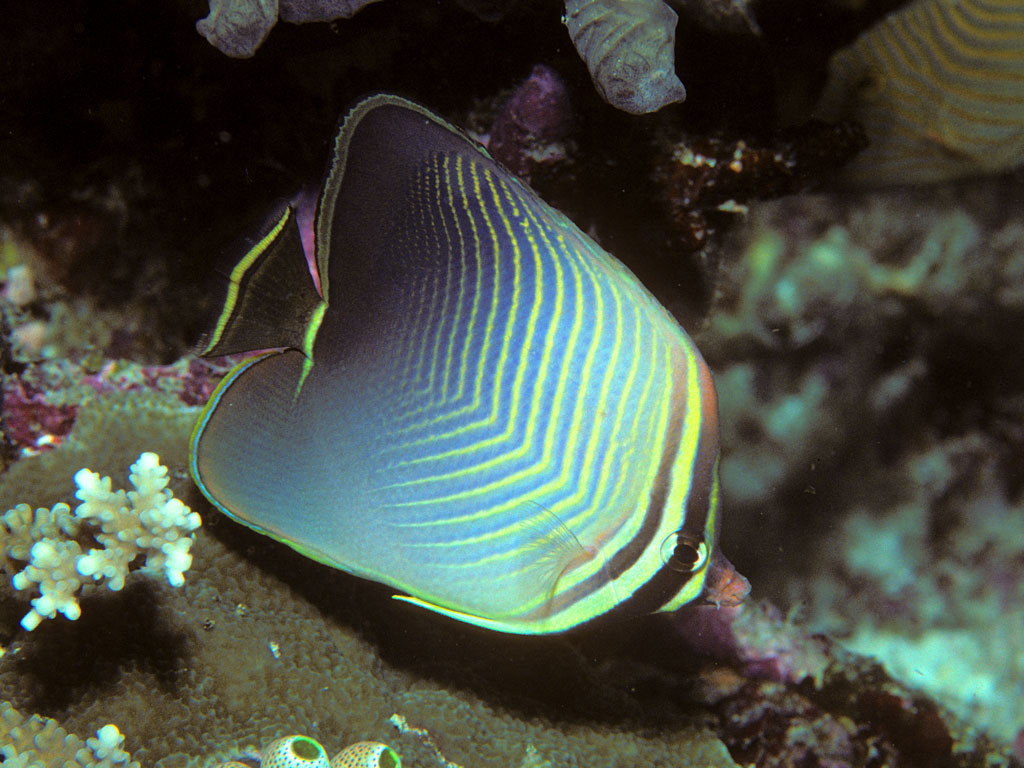

Conservation status
- Least Concern (IUCN 3.1)

Scientific classification
- Kingdom: Animalia
- Phylum: Chordata
- Class: Actinopterygii
- Order: Acanthuriformes
- Family: Chaetodontidae
- Genus: Chaetodon
- Subgenus: Chaetodon (Gonochaetodon)
- Species: C. baronessa

Binomial name
- Chaetodon baronessa G. Cuvier, 1829

Synonyms
- Citharoedus gonochaetodon baronessa (Cuvier, 1829)

= Eastern triangle butterflyfish =

Species of fish

The eastern triangle butterflyfish (Chaetodon baronessa), also known as the baroness butterflyfish, is a species of marine ray-finned fish, a butterflyfish belonging to the family Chaetodontidae. It is found in the central Indo-West Pacific region from the Cocos-Keeling Islands and Indonesia in the eastern Indian Ocean to Fiji and Tonga, north to southern Japan, south to New Caledonia and New South Wales in Australia.

== Description ==
It grows to a maximum of 16 cm long. The body has a pattern of alternating cream and grey-brown to purple chevron-shaped bars. There are three dark bars on the head, including one running across the eye.

== Habitat and behaviour ==
The eastern triangle butterflyfish is found in seaward and lagoon coral reefs. They usually swim around in pairs and are territorial. This species feeds exclusively on the polyps of the tubular Acropora corals.

== Phylogeny ==
The triangle butterflyfish (C. triangulum) is its western sister species, replacing C. baronessa in the Indian Ocean. The triangle butterflyfishes and the hooded butterflyfish (C. larvatus) form the subgenus Gonochaetodon. If Chaetodon is split up as some researchers propose, this group might go into Megaprotodon as other high-backed and square-bodied species, but its exact relationships are still not well known.
