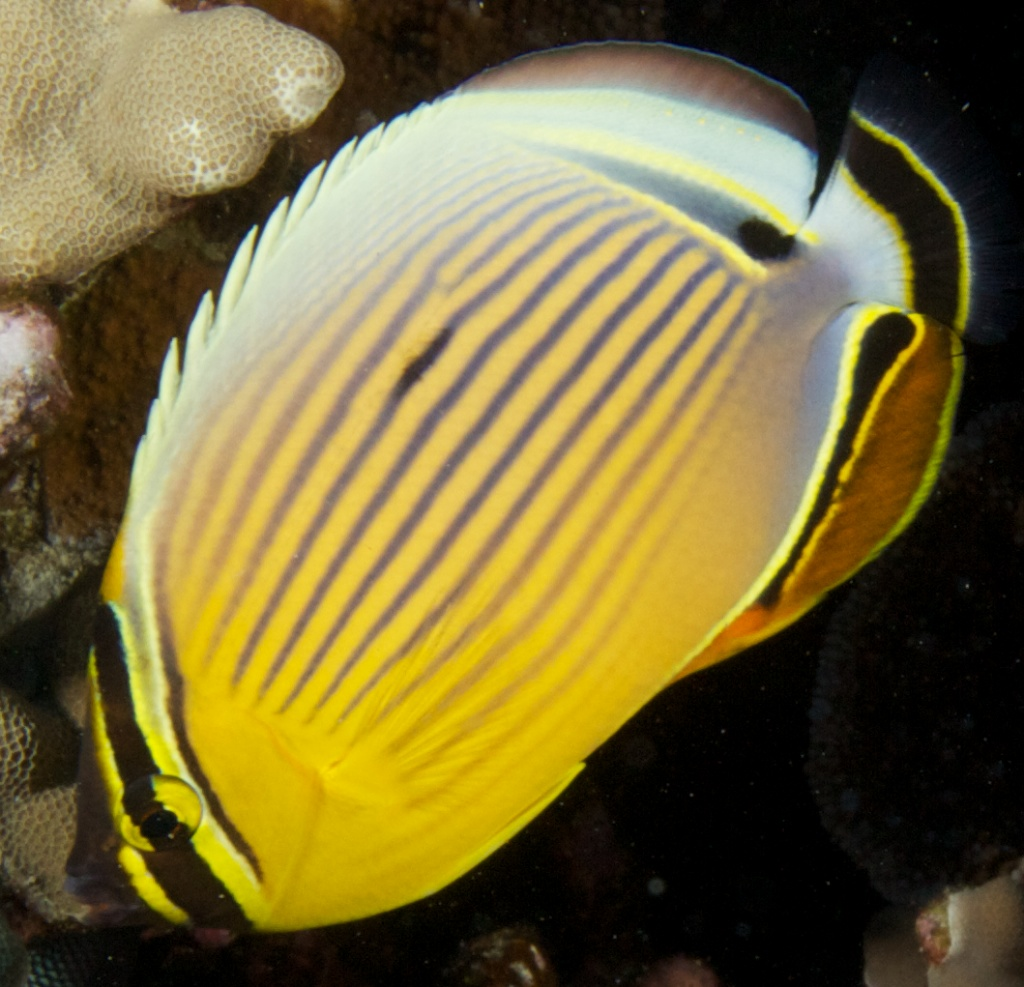

Conservation status
- Least Concern (IUCN 3.1)

Scientific classification
- Kingdom: Animalia
- Phylum: Chordata
- Class: Actinopterygii
- Division: Teleostei
- Order: Acanthuriformes
- Family: Chaetodontidae
- Genus: Chaetodon
- Subgenus: Chaetodon (Corallochaetodon)
- Species: C. lunulatus

Binomial name
- Chaetodon lunulatus Quoy & Gaimard, 1825

= Oval butterflyfish =

Species of fish

The oval butterflyfish (Chaetodon lunulatus), red-finned butterflyfish or redfin butterflyfish, is a species of marine ray-finned fish, a butterflyfish belonging to family Chaetodontidae. It is found in the Pacific Ocean from Eastern Indonesia to the Hawaiian islands. This is one species of a closely related group which includes the blacktail butterflyfish, which is found in the Red Sea and Gulf of Aden, and the melon butterflyfish, which is found in the Indian Ocean.

== Description and characteristics ==
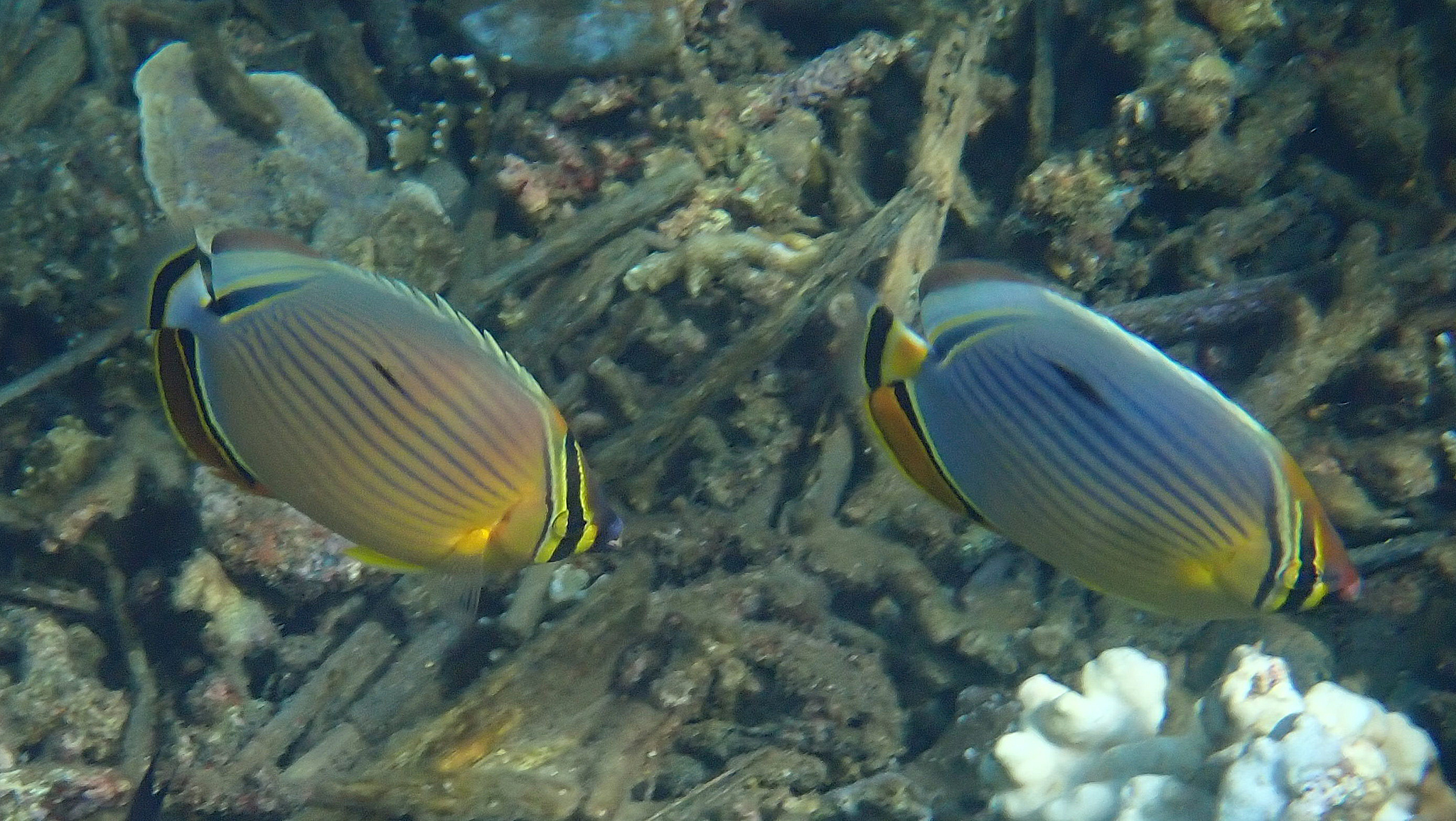
Compared to Indian redfin butterflyfish (right), in Indonesia

The blacktail butterflyfish (C. austriacus), melon butterflyfish (C. trifasciatus), and oval butterflyfish (C. lunulatus) are similar in coloration. The former has black caudal and anal fins, while the latter is an Indian Ocean species and has a more conspicuous back patch below the dorsal fin and a mainly yellow anal fin. Chaetodon lunulatus can grow up to 14 cm long. It has about 13–14 dorsal spines, 20–22 dorsal soft rays, three anal spines, and 18–21 anal soft rays.

Together with the black-tailed and melon butterflyfishes, and probably also the somewhat aberrant Arabian butterflyfish (C. melapterus), it makes up the subgenus Corallochaetodon. They are probably quite close to the subgenus "Citharoedus" (the name is a junior homonym of a mollusc genus), which contains the scrawled butterflyfish (C. meyeri). Like that group, they might be separated in Megaprotodon if the genus Chaetodon is split up.

== Habitat and range ==
Oval butterflyfish can be found in the Pacific Ocean from Japan and Australia to the North and South and Hawaii and the Tuamotu Islands to the East. They are benthopelagic and can be found in coral reefs in the tropics. They can be found at a depth of 3 to 30 meters in coral-rich lagoons and semi-protected seaward reefs. Small juveniles are secretive and hide in corals.

== Ecology and behavior ==
=== Diet ===
The butterflyfish species feeds almost exclusively on hard corals. The oval butterflyfish is a widespread corallivore and has been found to feed on 51 different types of coral, including Acropora florida, A. gemmifera, A. hyacinthus, A. intermedia, and Pocillopora damicornis.

==== Effects of coral bleaching ====
Coral bleaching has been shown to affect Chaetodon lunulatus. A 2004 study found a noticeable decline in the physiological condition of the oval butterflyfish before and immediately after a coral bleaching event, possibly leading to reductions in survivorship. A 2006 study found a significant decline in the abundance of various species of butterflyfish (including C. lunulatus) after a bleaching event in the Great Barrier Reef. Only obligate coral-feeding butterflyfishes, such as C. lunulatus, and not facultative or non-coral feeders displayed reductions in abundance. It has been suggested that these declines were due to starvation and death resulting from a lack of coral prey.

=== Reproduction and mating ===
The oval butterflyfish is oviparous and has little sexual dimorphism. In C. lunulatus, both solitary living and pair bonding occurs amongst individuals. Studies have found that heterosexual pairing predominates, most likely to facilitate reproduction. Partner fidelity appears long-lasting, with one study reporting that individuals remained paired for up to seven years. In these pair-bonds, females feed more frequently, while males tend to take the leading position when swimming in tandem. The pairs display a high level of parallel and proximate (1.5 m) swimming, and almost always remain in close range (4 m).

=== Territoriality ===
Butterflyfish defend their territories against conspecifics. A tail-up display is a common antagonistic behavior in the Chaetodon species. It is performed towards conspecifics in territorial disputes as well as in non-agonistic interactions with a pair partner. C. lunulatus may attack individuals when they do not perform the tail-up display. In territorial interactions, the fish display behavioral patterns such as encircling, staring, tail-up display, two-piled-tops fighting, parallel swimming, chasing, rushing, fleeing, and attacking. Fatal fighting only occurs over mating resources but not for resources such as shelter or food.
