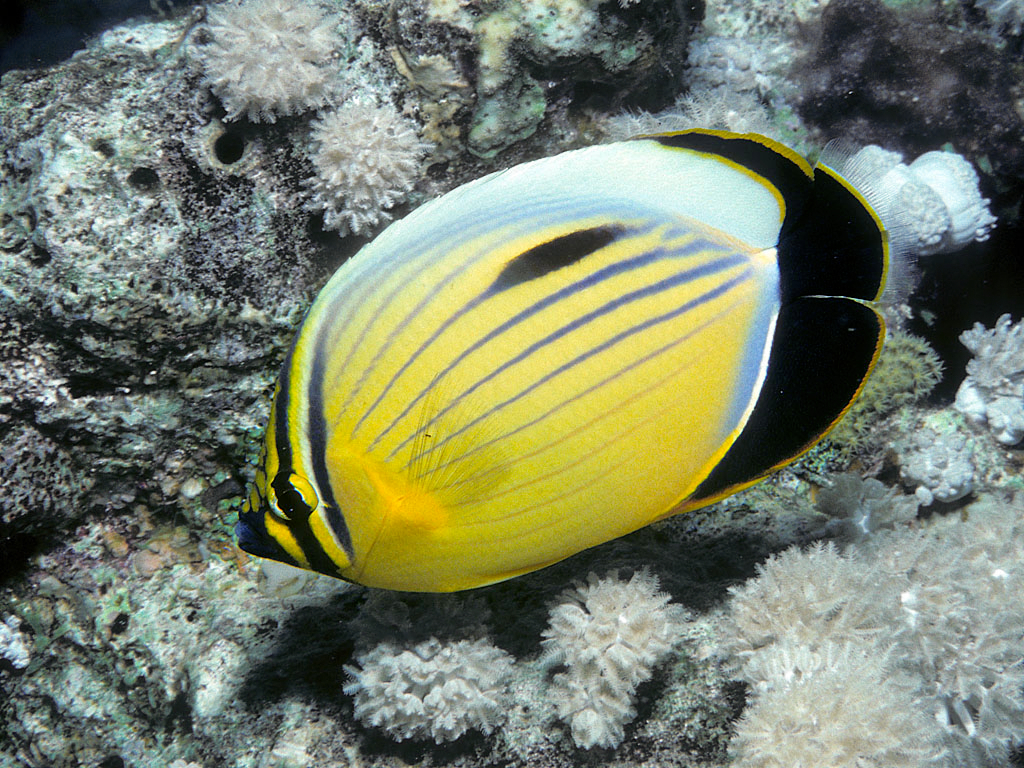

Conservation status
- Least Concern (IUCN 3.1)

Scientific classification
- Kingdom: Animalia
- Phylum: Chordata
- Class: Actinopterygii
- Order: Acanthuriformes
- Family: Chaetodontidae
- Genus: Chaetodon
- Subgenus: Chaetodon (Corallochaetodon)
- Species: C. austriacus

Binomial name
- Chaetodon austriacus Rüppell, 1836

Synonyms
- Chaetodon trifasciatus austriacus Rüppell, 1836; Citharoedus austriacus (Rüppell, 1836); Mesochaetodon corallochaetodon austriacus (Rüppell, 1836); Chaetodon klunzingeri Kossman & Räuber, 1877; Chaetodon trifasciatus klunzingeri Kossman & Räuber, 1877

= Blacktail butterflyfish =

Species of fish

The blacktail butterflyfish (Chaetodon austriacus), also known as black-tailed butterflyfish or exquisite butterflyfish, is a species marine ray-finned fish, a butterflyfish belonging to the family Chaetodontidae. It is native to the western Indian Ocean but has reached the Mediterranean Sea as a Lessepsian migrant through the Suez Canal.

== Distribution ==
The species is native to the Red Sea and southern Oman. A single record was reported in 2011 in the vicinity of Tel Aviv (Israel), a likely migrant from the Red Sea.

== Taxonomy ==
Together with the melon (C. trifasciatus) and oval (C. lunulatus) butterflyfishes and probably also the somewhat aberrant Arabian butterflyfish (C. melapterus), the blacktail butterflyfish makes up the subgenus Corallochaetodon. They are probably quite close to the subgenus called Citharoedus (that name is a junior homonym of a mollusc genus), which contains for example the scrawled butterflyfish (C. meyeri). Like that group, they might be separated in Megaprotodon if the genus Chaetodon is split up.

== Description ==
The black-tailed butterflyfish is up to 14 cm long and is orange with thin, curved black stripes. Its anal fin and tail are black. The body of juveniles is whiter above with white bands on the tail. The melon butterflyfish (C. trifasciatus) and the oval butterflyfish (C. lunulatus) are similar in coloration but have less black on the caudal and anal fins.

== Ecology ==
Black-tailed butterflyfishes tend to be found in coral-rich areas between 0.5 and 20 m deep, on seaward reefs or in lagoons or bays. Adults are generally found in pairs patrolling a territory or range while juveniles are found among coral branches. This species grazes on coral polyps and sea anemone tentacles.
