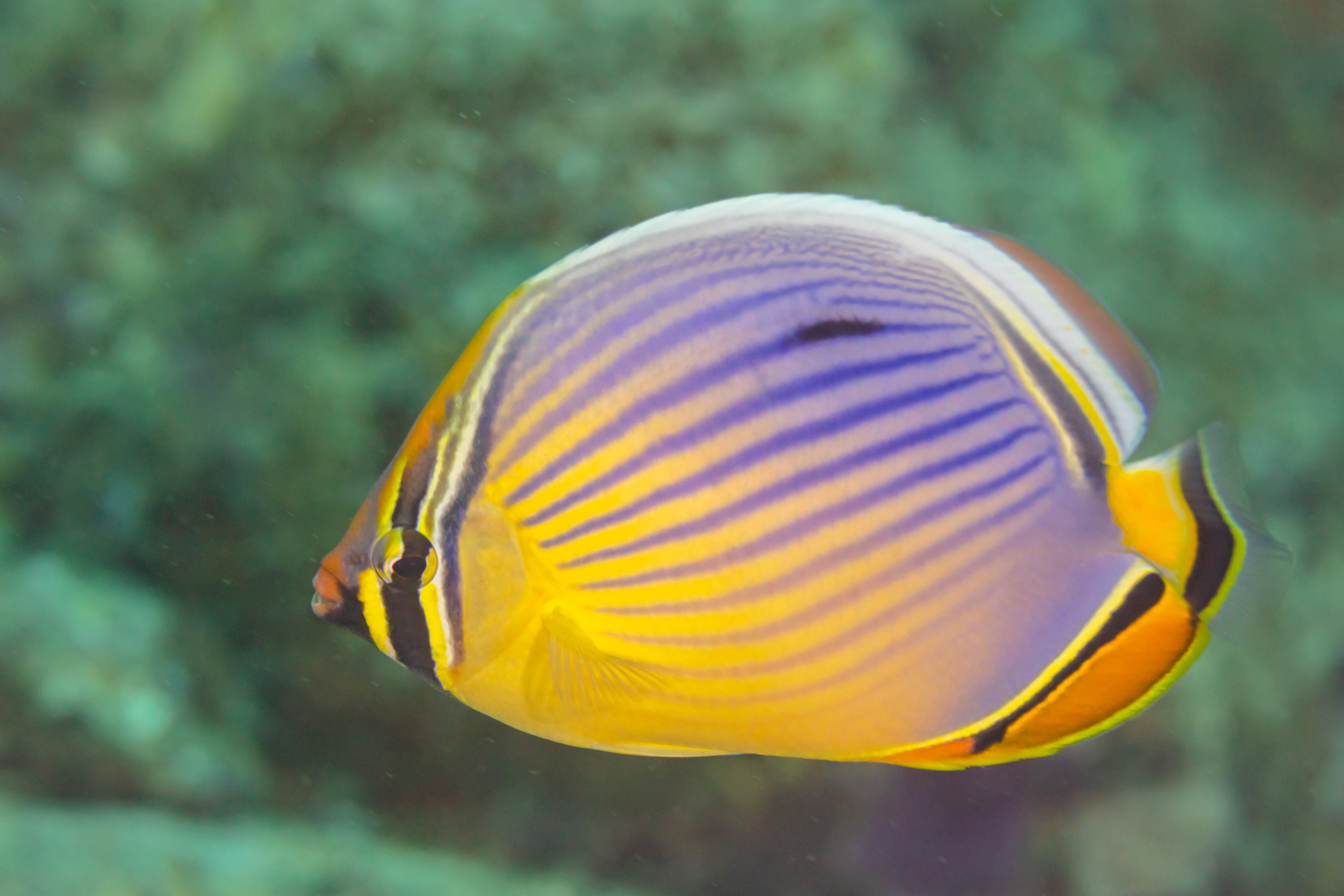

Conservation status
- Least Concern (IUCN 3.1)

Scientific classification
- Kingdom: Animalia
- Phylum: Chordata
- Class: Actinopterygii
- Order: Acanthuriformes
- Family: Chaetodontidae
- Genus: Chaetodon
- Subgenus: Chaetodon (Corallochaetodon)
- Species: C. trifasciatus

Binomial name
- Chaetodon trifasciatus M. Park, 1797

Synonyms
- List: Chaetodon trifasciatus trifasciatus Park, 1797; Mesochaetodon trifasciatus (Park, 1797); Tetragonoptrus trifasciatus (Park, 1797); Chaetodon vittatus Bloch & Schneider, 1801; Tetragonoptrus vittatus (Bloch & Schneider, 1801); Chaetodon taunigrum Cuvier, 1831; Chaetodon bellus Solander, 1839; Chaetodon layardi Blyth, 1852; Chaetodon pepek Montrouzier, 1857; Chaetodon ovalis Thiollière, 1857; Chaetodon trifasciatus caudifasciatus Ahl, 1923

= Melon butterflyfish =

Species of fish

The melon butterflyfish (Chaetodon trifasciatus) or the Indian redfin butterflyfish, is a species of marine ray-finned fish, a butterflyfish belonging to the family Chaetodontidae. It is found in the Indian Ocean from East Africa to Western Java. This is one species of a closely related group which includes the blacktail butterflyfish (C. austriacus) of the Red Sea and Gulf of Aden and the oval butterflyfish (C. lunulatus) which is found in the western Pacific, from eastern coasts of the Indonesian islands to Australia.

Melon butterflyfish should not be confused with chevron butterflyfish (C. trifascialis), three-striped butterflyfish (C. tricinctus), or three-banded butterflyfish (C. robustus).

== Description and characteristics ==
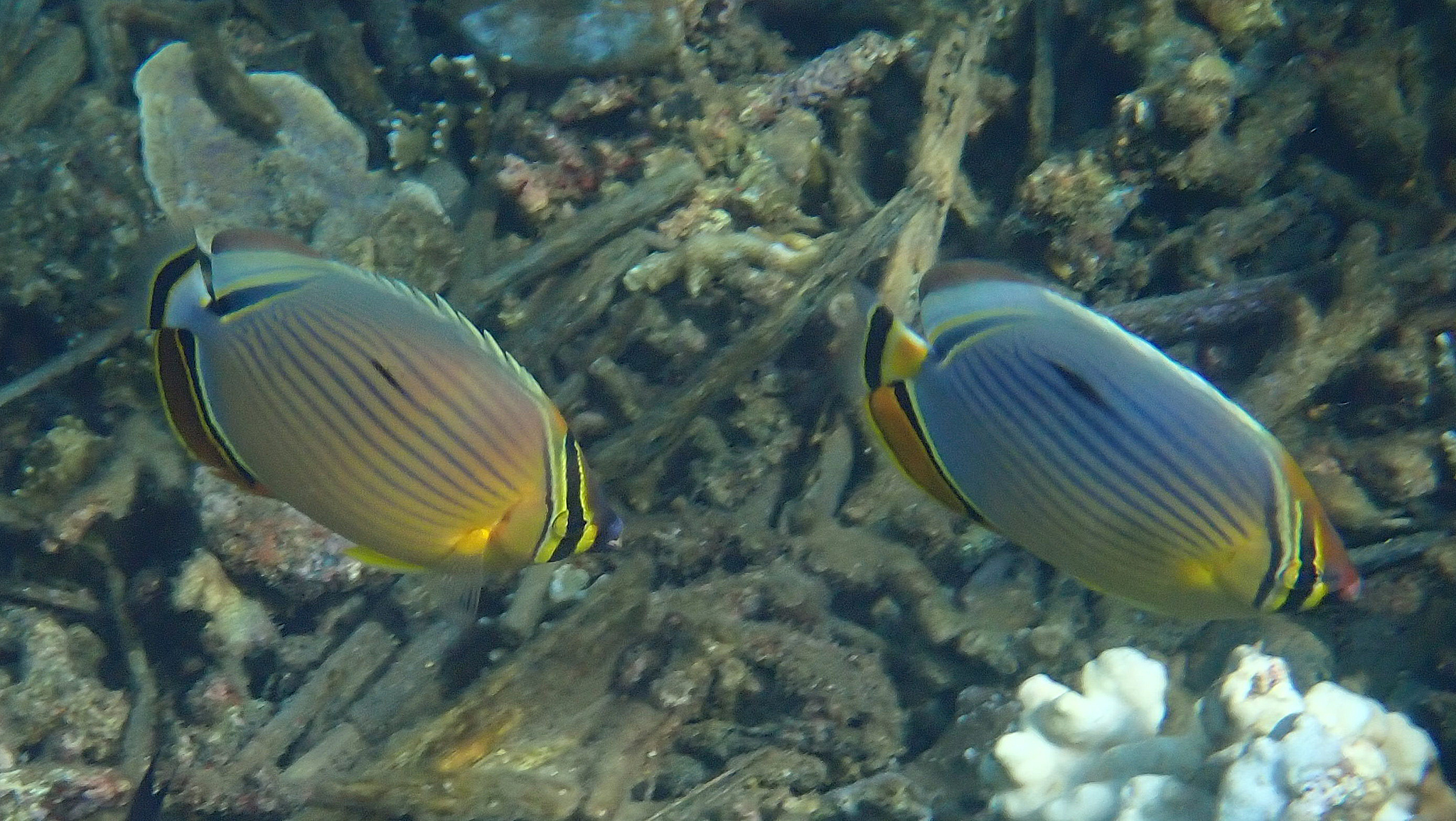
Compared to redfin butterflyfish (left), in Indonesia

The oval butterflyfish and the blacktail butterflyfish resemble C. trifasciatus in coloration. The former has a less conspicuous back patch below the dorsal fin and a mainly dark anal fin, while the latter has black caudal and anal fins.

Melon, black-tailed, oval butterflyfishes, and probably also the somewhat aberrant Arabian butterflyfish (C. melapterus) make up the subgenus Corallochaetodon, of which C. trifasciatus is the type species. They are probably quite close to the subgenus called "Citharoedus" (that name is a junior homonym of a mollusc genus), which contains for example the scrawled butterflyfish (C. meyeri). Like that group, they might be separated in Megaprotodon if the genus Chaetodon is split up.

== Habitat and range ==
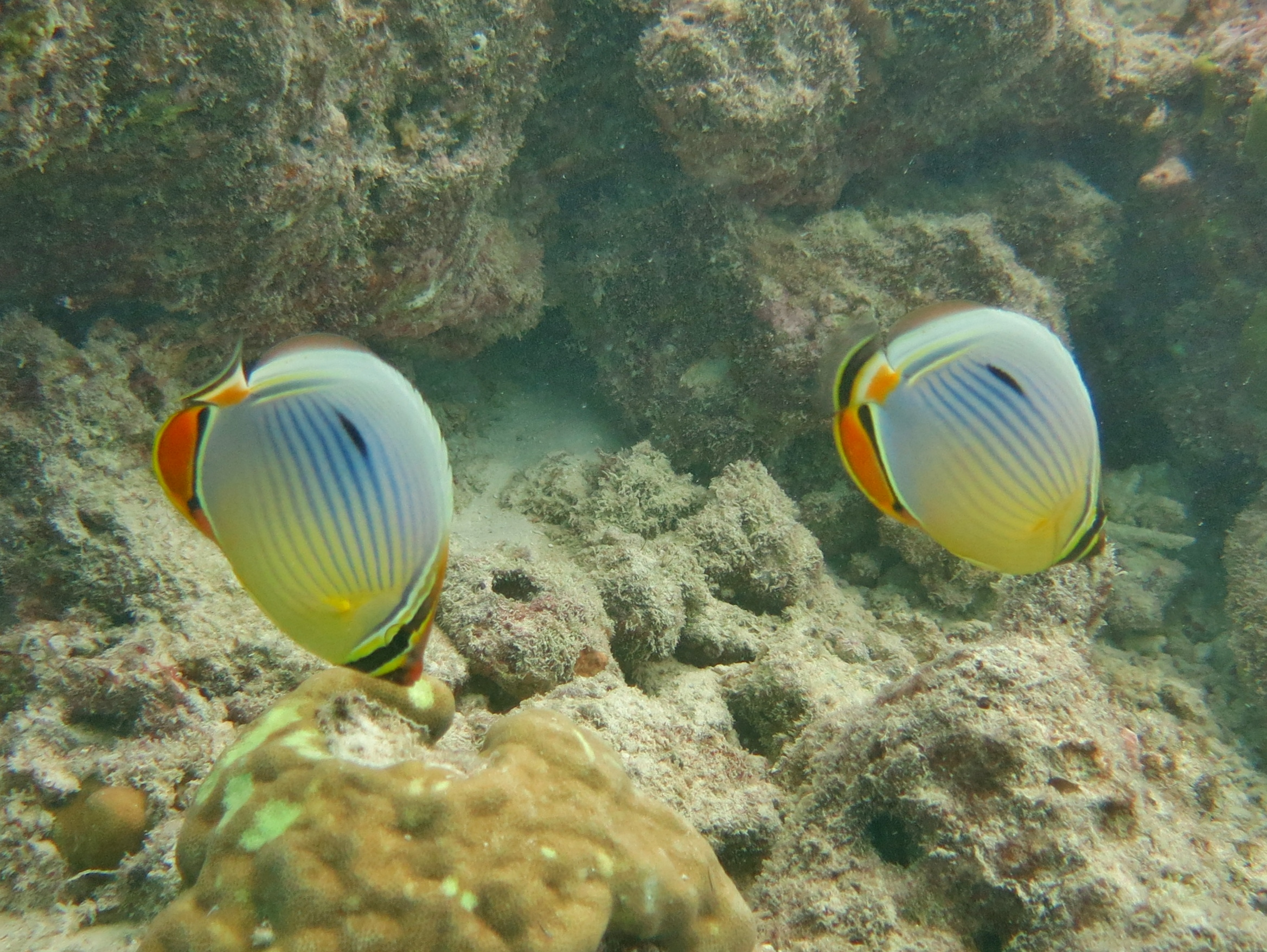
A pair in the Maldives.

The melon butterflyfish is found in the Indian Ocean from East Africa to Western Java, at depths between 2 and 20 m, in coral-rich lagoons and semi-protected seaward reefs. Small juveniles are secretive and hide in corals.

== Ecology and behaviour ==
Growing to a maximum of 15 cm long, the monogamous adults swim in pairs and may be territorial and aggressive to other Chaetodon. Melon butterflyfish feed exclusively on coral polyps, particularly of Pocillopora. They are oviparous.
