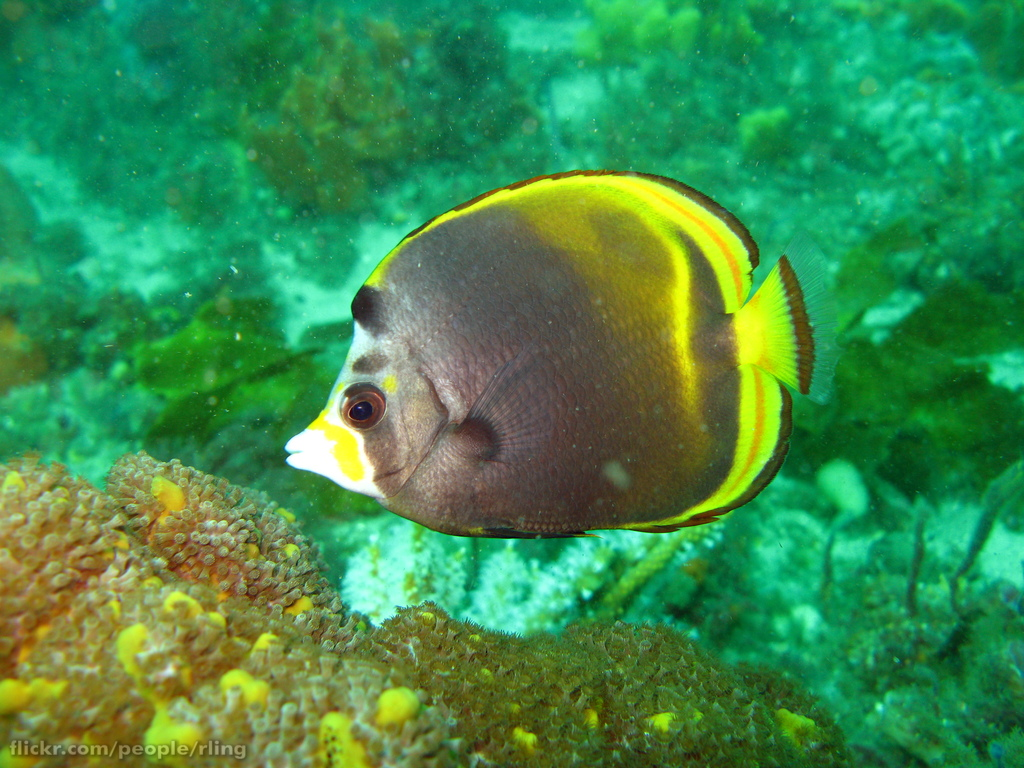

Conservation status
- Least Concern (IUCN 3.1)

Scientific classification
- Kingdom: Animalia
- Phylum: Chordata
- Class: Actinopterygii
- Division: Teleostei
- Order: Acanthuriformes
- Family: Chaetodontidae
- Genus: Chaetodon
- Subgenus: Chaetodon (Rabdophorus)
- Species: C. flavirostris

Binomial name
- Chaetodon flavirostris Günther, 1874

Synonyms
- Chaetodontops flavirostris (Günther, 1874); Chaetodon aphrodite Ogilby, 1889; Chaetodon dorsiocellatus Ahl, 1923

= Black butterflyfish =

Species of fish

The black butterflyfish (Chaetodon flavirostris), also known as the dusky butterflyfish, is a species of marine ray-finnedfish, a butterflyfish belonging to the family Chaetodontidae. It is native to the Pacific Ocean.

== Description ==
The black butterflyfish has a darkish bluish-grey body with a contrasting white mouth, and a narrow yellow band on its snout. There is a dark darker bump on the forehead. The dorsal, anal, and caudal fins are yellow. There is an orange band which runs across the dorsal and anal fins and across the caudal peduncle, these fins also have black margins, as does the tail. Juveniles have paler grey bodies and yellow median fins. The dorsal fin has 12–13 spines and 24–27 soft rays while the anal fin has 3 spines and 20–21 soft rays. This species reaches a maximum total length of 20 centimetres (7.9 in).

== Distribution ==
The black butterflyfish is found in the southern Pacific Ocean where it occurs from the Great Barrier Reef and New South Wales, Lord Howe Island east as far as Easter Island, including American Samoa, the Cook Islands, Fiji, French Polynesia, New Caledonia, Niue, Norfolk Island, Pitcairn Island, Samoa, the Solomon Island, Tonga, Vanuatu, and Wallis and Futuna. The record from Easter Island is thought to refer to a vagrant. It is also found in the Indian Ocean in the Cocos (Keeling) Islands.

== Habitat and biology ==
The black butterflyfish is found at depths of 2 to 20 metres (6.6 to 65.6 ft) in rocky areas which have good coverage of coral and algae in lagoons and on seaward reefs, they can occur in estuaries. It is an omnivorous species, consuming algae, coral, and small benthic invertebrates. They are oviparous and breed as pairs. They also live as a pair. In some areas aggregations are known. The juveniles are found in protected inner reefs.

== Systematics ==
The black butterflyfish was first formally described in 1874 by the German born British ichthyologist Albert Günther (1830–1914) with the type locality given as Vavau, Tonga. It belongs to the large subgenus Rabdophorus which might warrant recognition as a distinct genus. In this group close relatives appear to be the diagonal butterflyfish (Chaetodon fasciatus), the raccoon butterflyfish (C. lunula) and the Philippine butterflyfish (C. adiergastos), and perhaps also the unusual red-tailed butterflyfish (C. collare). Although the colouration of this group varies quite a lot, they are all largish butterflyfishes with an oval outline, and most have a pattern of ascending oblique stripes on the flanks. Except in the red-tailed butterflyfish, there is at least a vestigial form of the "raccoon" mask, with a white space between the dark crown and eye areas.

== Utilisation ==
The black butterflyfish is occasionally found in the aquarium trade but this species does not thrive in captivity and has a poor survival rate in transit too.
