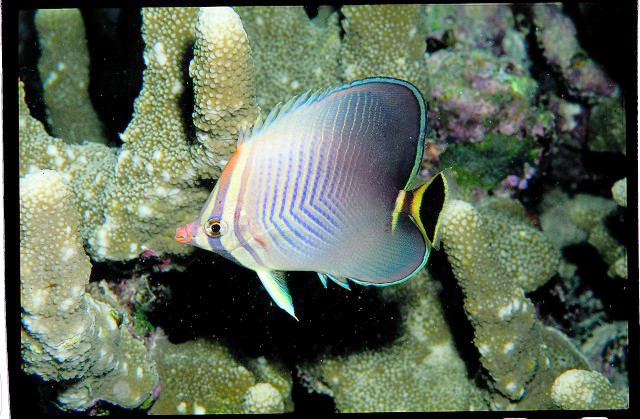

Conservation status
- Least Concern (IUCN 3.1)

Scientific classification
- Kingdom: Animalia
- Phylum: Chordata
- Class: Actinopterygii
- Division: Teleostei
- Order: Acanthuriformes
- Family: Chaetodontidae
- Genus: Chaetodon
- Subgenus: Chaetodon (Gonochaetodon)
- Species: C. triangulum

Binomial name
- Chaetodon triangulum Cuvier, 1831

Synonyms
- Gonochaetodon triangulum (Cuvier, 1831)

= Chaetodon triangulum =

Species of fish

Chaetodon triangulum, the triangle butterflyfish or herringbone butterflyfish, is a species of marine ray-finned fish, a butterflyfish belonging to the family Chaetodontidae. It is native to the tropical Indian Ocean.

== Description ==
Chaetodon triangulum has a flat triangular shaped body, emphasised when the fins are fully spread, and an elongated snout. Its body is predominantly whitish in colour with many broad, vertical grey chevron-shaped bands along the sides, Its mouth is orange, and there is a brownish orange vertical band through the eye, which grows brighter orange closer to the top of the head widening as it extends rearward on the base of the dorsal fin in adults. The caudal peduncle is black, as is the caudal fin but its margins are yellow. The dorsal fin has 11–12 spines and 23–26 soft rays while the anal fin contains 3 spines and 20–21 soft rays. This species attains a maximum total length of 16 centimetres (6.3 in).

== Distribution ==
Chaetodon triangulum has a wide distribution in the Indian Ocean from the coast of tropical East Africa east to the Andaman Sea and along the Indian Ocean coastlines of Sumatra and Java. It also appears at the Seribu Islands and has been reported near Bali.

== Habitat and biology ==
Chaetodon triangulum is found in lagoon and seaward reefs where it is strongly associated with corals in the genus Acropora, especially staghorn corals. This is a territorial species which lives in pairs, although solitary juveniles hide among coral branches. Triangle butterflyfish are obligate corallivores that feed primarily on Acropora corals. They defend patches of these corals and actively chase other butterflyfishes from these territories and the food supply it contains.

== Taxonomy ==
Chaetodon triangulum was first formally described in 1831 by the French anatomist Georges Cuvier (1769–1832) with the type locality given as Jakarta.
