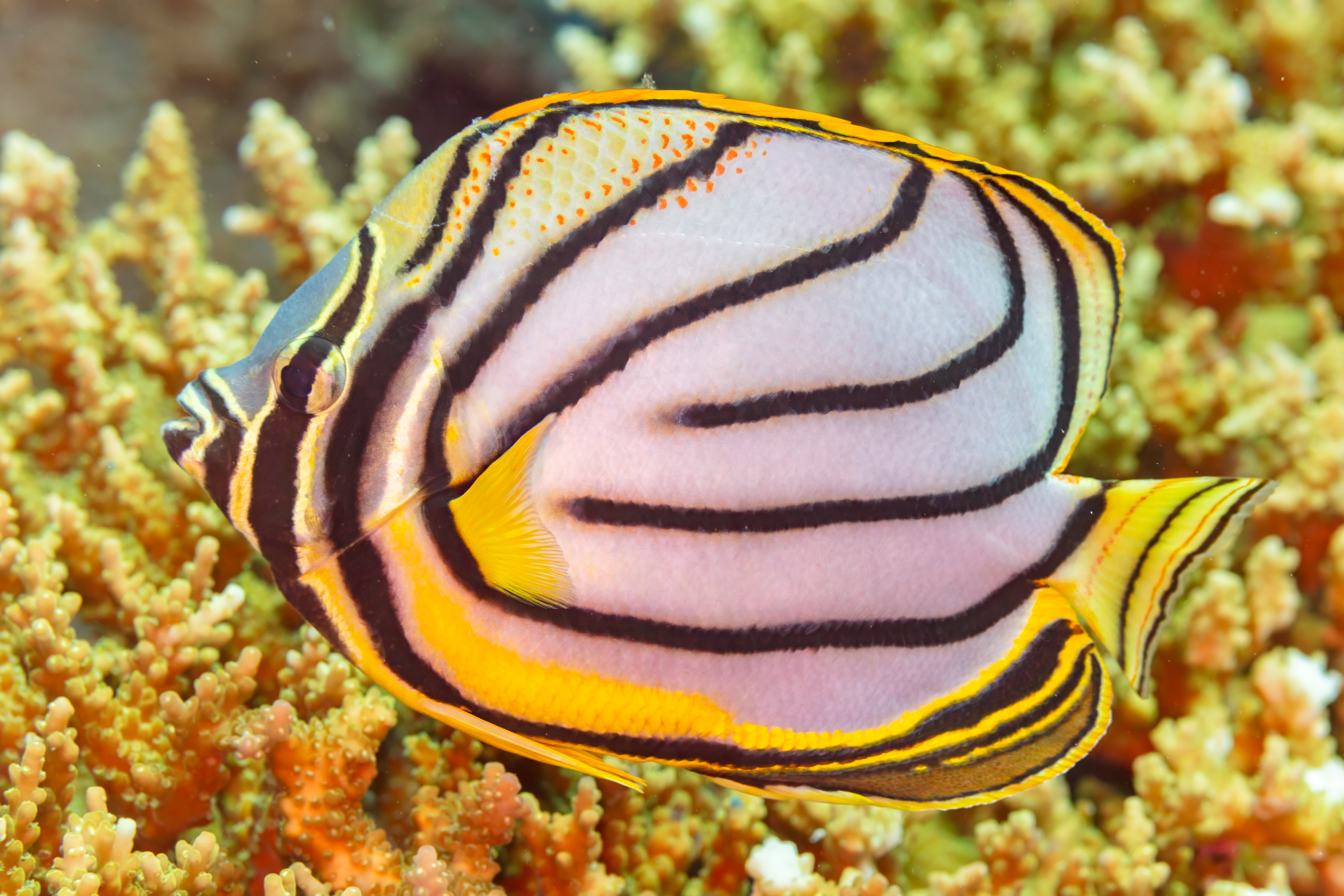

Conservation status
- Least Concern (IUCN 3.1)

Scientific classification
- Kingdom: Animalia
- Phylum: Chordata
- Class: Actinopterygii
- Division: Teleostei
- Order: Acanthuriformes
- Family: Chaetodontidae
- Genus: Chaetodon
- Subgenus: Chaetodon (Citharoedus)
- Species: C. meyeri

Binomial name
- Chaetodon meyeri Bloch & J. G. Schneider, 1801

Synonyms
- Holacanthus flavoniger Lacépède, 1802

= Scrawled butterflyfish =

Species of fish

The scrawled butterflyfish (Chaetodon meyeri), also known as Meyer's butterflyfish or the maypole butterflyfish, is a species of marine ray-finned fish, a butterflyfish belonging to the family Chaetodontidae. It is found in the Indian and Pacific Oceans.

== Description ==
The scrawled butterflyfish has a whitish or bluish-white body that is marked with curved and diagonal black bars on its flanks, on the curved bars the curve is towards the rear. A yellow edged black bar runs through the eye and a similar bar is on the snout, around the mouth. This species has 12–13 spines and 23–25 soft rays in its dorsal fin and 3 spines and 18–20 soft rays in its anal fin. It attains a maximum total length of 20 centimetres (7.9 in).

== Distribution ==
The scrawled butterflyfish has an Indo-Pacific distribution. It is found along the eastern coast of Africa from Somalia to Durban across the Indian and Pacific Oceans as far east as the Line Islands and Hawaii. Its range extends north to the Ryukyu Islands of Japan and south to the Great Barrier Reef, New Caledonia and Tonga. Vagrants have been recorded in the eastern Pacific Ocean at the Galapagos Islands, Ecuador, and the Revillagigedo Islands of Mexico.

== Habitat and biology ==
The scrawled butterflyfish is found at depths between 2 and 25 metres (6.6 and 82.0 ft) where it inhabits area rich in coral in clear lagoons and seaward reefs. The juveniles are normally solitary and live among branching corals while the adults typically live as pairs and have a home range. They are oviparous and breed in pairs. It is an obligate corrallivore but it is thought that they feed on the mucus of the coral rather than the actual coral tissue.

== Systematics ==
The scrawled butterflyfish was first formally described in 1801 by the German naturalists Marcus Elieser Bloch (1723–1799) and Johann Gottlob Theaenus Schneider (1750–1822) with the type locality given as Ambon Island in Indonesia. The identity of the person that the specific name honours is not given by Black and Schneider but the type specimen was in the collection of the Museo Meyeri Lugduni Batavorum or Meyer's Museum in Leiden, Netherlands. This Meyer could have been Johan Frederik Meijer, who was a "bookkeeper" at Ambon Island and who had kept a small natural-history cabinet in the Netherlands during the 1700s.

It is a close relative of the mailed butterflyfish (C. reticulatus) and the ornate butterflyfish (C. ornatissimus). Together they make up the subgenus called "Citharoedus", but as this name had already been used for a mollusc genus when it was given to the fish, it is not valid. They are probably quite close to the subgenus Corallochaetodon which contains for example the melon butterflyfish (C. trifasciatus). Like these, they might be separated in Megaprotodon if the genus Chaetodon is split up.
