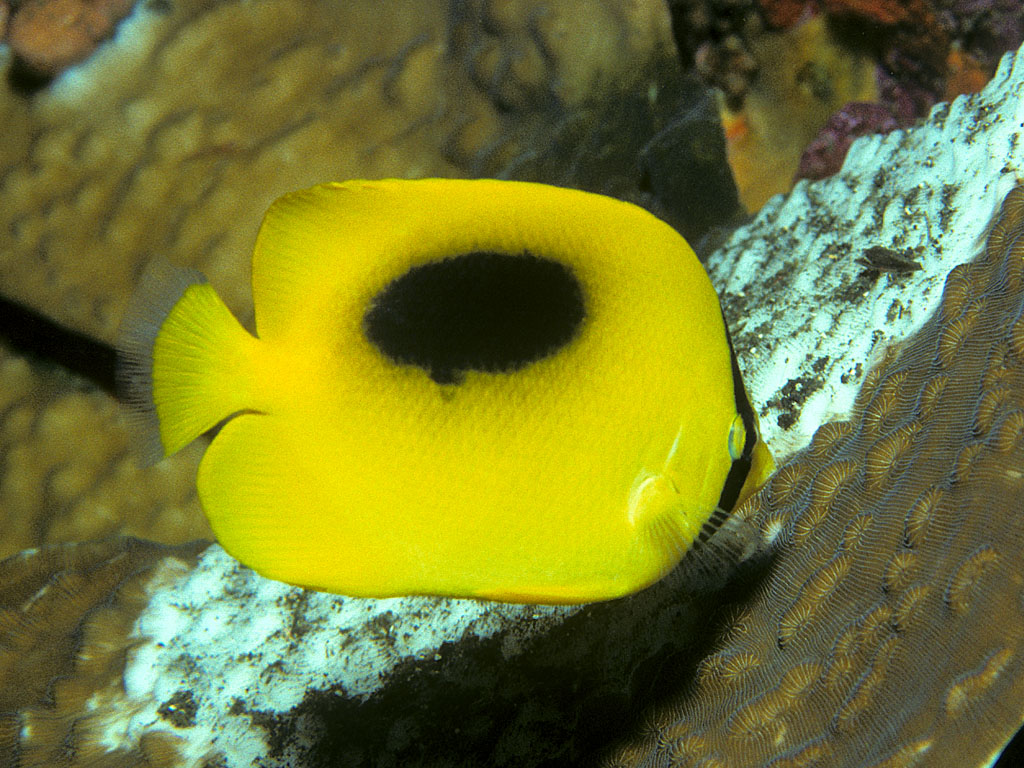

Conservation status
- Least Concern (IUCN 3.1)

Scientific classification
- Kingdom: Animalia
- Phylum: Chordata
- Class: Actinopterygii
- Division: Teleostei
- Order: Acanthuriformes
- Family: Chaetodontidae
- Genus: Chaetodon
- Subgenus: Chaetodon (Tetrachaetodon)
- Species: C. speculum

Binomial name
- Chaetodon speculum G. Cuvier, 1831

Synonyms
- Nalbantius speculum (Cuvier, 1831); Chaetodon spilopleura Cuvier, 1831; Chaetodon ocellifer V. Franz, 1910

= Mirror butterflyfish =

Species of fish

The mirror butterflyfish or oval-spot butterflyfish (Chaetodon speculum) is a species of butterflyfish (family Chaetodontidae). It is found in the Indo-Pacific region from Indonesia to Japan and south to the Great Barrier Reef and Papua New Guinea. The species has also been reported from Madagascar, Mauritius and Réunion.

It grows to a maximum of 18 cm (7 in) in length. There are 14 spines and 17–18 soft rays in the dorsal fin and 3 spines and 15–16 soft rays in the anal fin. The body color is a bright to orange-yellow with a big black blotch below the dorsal fin and a vertical black bar running through the eye.

The mirror butterflyfish was first formally described in 1831 by the French anatomist Georges Cuvier (1769–1832) with the type locality given as Jakarta.

Like the other butterflyfishes with angular yellow bodies with black eyestripes and a single differently-colored patch (except in the quite basal blue-lashed butterflyfish, C. bennetti), it belongs in the subgenus Tetrachaetodon. Among this group it seems to be particularly close to the Zanzibar butterflyfish (Chaetodon zanzibarensis) which has a smaller black blotch and traces of horizontal stripes on the flanks. If Chaetodon is split up, the subgenus Tetrachaetodon would be placed in Megaprotodon.

The Mirror Butterflyfish is found in coral reefs at depths between 3 and 30 m. It favors coastal reef slopes rich in hydroids and sea anemones. Small juveniles hide in coral thickets. Usually, this species is solitary and relatively uncommon. They feed on coral polyps and invertebrates.
