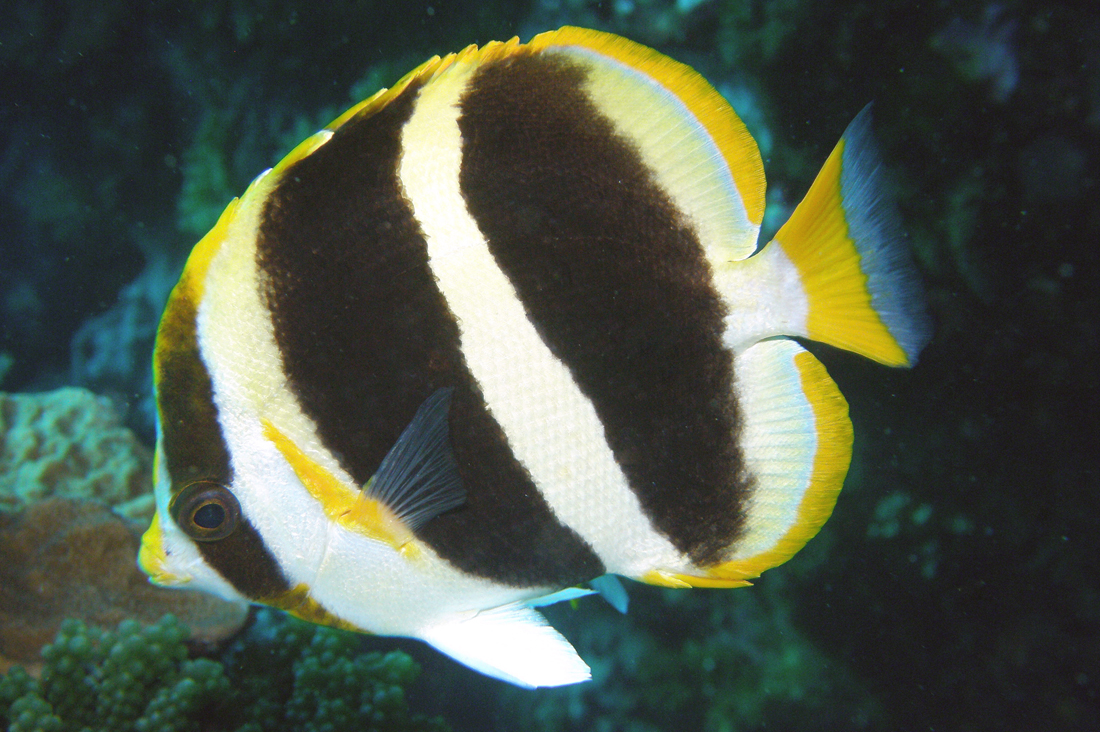

Conservation status
- Least Concern (IUCN 3.1)

Scientific classification
- Kingdom: Animalia
- Phylum: Chordata
- Class: Actinopterygii
- Division: Teleostei
- Order: Acanthuriformes
- Family: Chaetodontidae
- Genus: Chaetodon
- Subgenus: Chaetodon (Discochaetodon)
- Species: C. tricinctus

Binomial name
- Chaetodon tricinctus Waite, 1901

= Three-striped butterflyfish =

Species of fish

The three-striped butterflyfish (Chaetodon tricinctus) is a species of marine ray-finned fish, a butterflyfish belonging to the family Chaetodontidae. It is native to eastern Australia, Lord Howe Island and Norfolk Island in the Tasman Sea. It is found a depths of 3 to 15 metres (9.8 to 49.2 ft) on coral-rich lagoons and outer reefs. This species reaches a maximum length of 15 centimetres (5.9 in) TL.
