= Heniochus pleurotaenia =

Conservation status
- Least Concern (IUCN 3.1)

Scientific classification
- Kingdom: Animalia
- Phylum: Chordata
- Class: Actinopterygii
- Division: Teleostei
- Order: Acanthuriformes
- Family: Chaetodontidae
- Genus: Heniochus
- Species: H. pleurotaenia

Binomial name
- Heniochus pleurotaenia Ahl, 1923

Species of fish

Heniochus pleurotaenia, the phantom bannerfish, is a marine fish belonging to the family Chaetodontidae, native from the central Indo-Pacific area.

== Description ==
The phantom bannerfish is a small-sized fish that can reach a maximum length of 17 cm.

Its body is compressed laterally, with the first rays of its dorsal fin stretched in short white feather-like filaments. The background color is white with light chocolate to dark areas and a brown face mask covering the mouth, eyes and reaches to the base of the first rays of the dorsal fin. Its stretched snout has a small terminal protractile mouth. A little horn adorns the axis between the eyes and a rounded frontal outgrowth gives the impression that the profile of its face is concave. A second area forms an inverted "v" starting at the ventral fins and ending on the anal fin. A third chocolate area runs from the last rays of the dorsal fin to the base of caudal peduncle.

The phantom bannerfish can be confused with the very similar horned bannerfish, Heniochus varius, which however does not have the reversed "v" pattern on its sides. Juveniles who lack the white insert can be distinguished by the shorter extension of the first rays of the dorsal fin.

== Distribution and habitat ==
The phantom bannerfish is widespread throughout the tropical and subtropical waters of the central Indo-Pacific from the Maldives to the western coast of Thailand and from the south tip of India to Java (Indonesia). It inhabits areas rich in coral in shallow lagoons and external reef slopes from the surface to a depth of 25 meters.

== Habitat and biology ==
Heniochus pleurotaenia is found in coral-rich areas of lagoons and seaward reefs where it occurs in pairs or aggregations. In Indonesia it is normally observed in pairs in coastal waters while in offshore areas these fish may aggregate to create schools and in some areas, such as the Maldives, they can be seen in very large schools. The phantom bannerfish are found at various depths, they are frequently on shallow reef crest which are subject to surge. They seem to prefer mixed algae and coral habitats down to depths of 15 metres (49 ft) but are also found in deeper, offshore waters. This is an oviparous species which forms pairs during breeding.

== Conservation status ==
In some geographic areas, the phantom bannerfish is occasionally harvested for the aquarium trade, however, the species does not currently appear threatened and is listed as Least Concern (LC) by the IUCN.
