= Orange-tailed coralfish =

Scientific classification
- Kingdom: Animalia
- Phylum: Chordata
- Class: Actinopterygii
- Order: Acanthuriformes
- Family: Chaetodontidae
- Genus: Coradion
- Species: C. calendula

Binomial name
- Coradion calendula Matsunuma, Motomura & Seah, 2023

Species of fish

The orange-tailed coralfish (Coradion calendula), is a species of butterflyfish native to the coast of Australia. It was described based on 44 individuals collected in Western Australia, the Northern Territory, and north Queensland and closely resembles the orange-banded coralfish, but with an orange tail.
