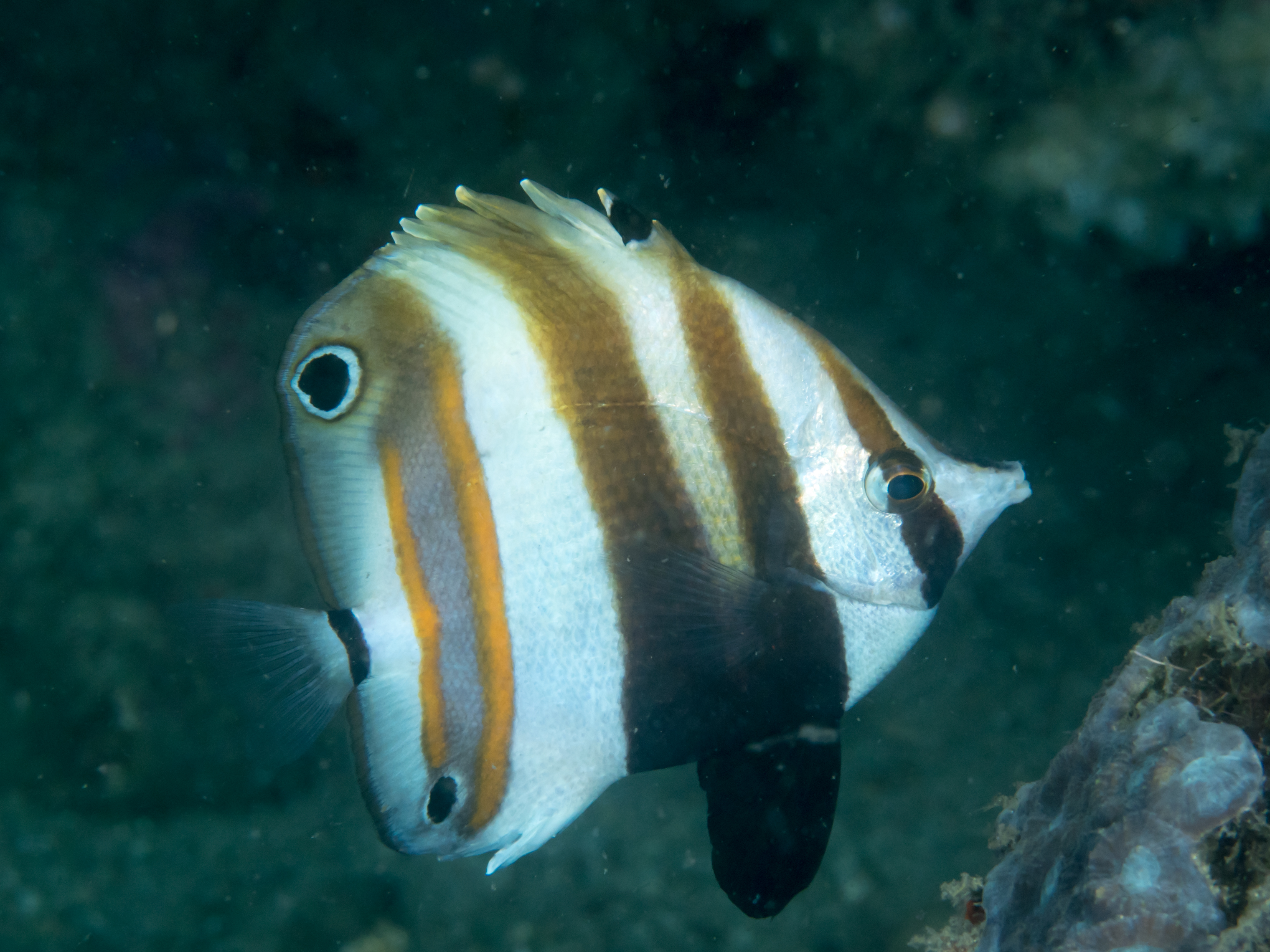

Conservation status
- Least Concern (IUCN 3.1)

Scientific classification
- Kingdom: Animalia
- Phylum: Chordata
- Class: Actinopterygii
- Order: Acanthuriformes
- Family: Chaetodontidae
- Genus: Coradion
- Species: C. melanopus

Binomial name
- Coradion melanopus (Cuvier, 1831)

Synonyms
- Chaetodon melanopus Cuvier, 1831; Tetragnoptrus melanopus (Cuvier, 1831)

= Coradion melanopus =

Species of fish, the twospot coralfish

Coradion melanopus, known commonly as the twospot coralfish, is a species of marine ray-finned fish, a butterflyfish in the family Chaetodontidae. It is widespread throughout the tropical waters of the central Indo-Pacific region, from Indonesia to the Philippines. The twospot coralfish is a small size species which attains a maximum size of 15 cm length. It is a cautious species which inhabits sheltered lagoons or exposed outer reefs where it feeds on sponges, especially along drop offs. It forms pair to breed.
