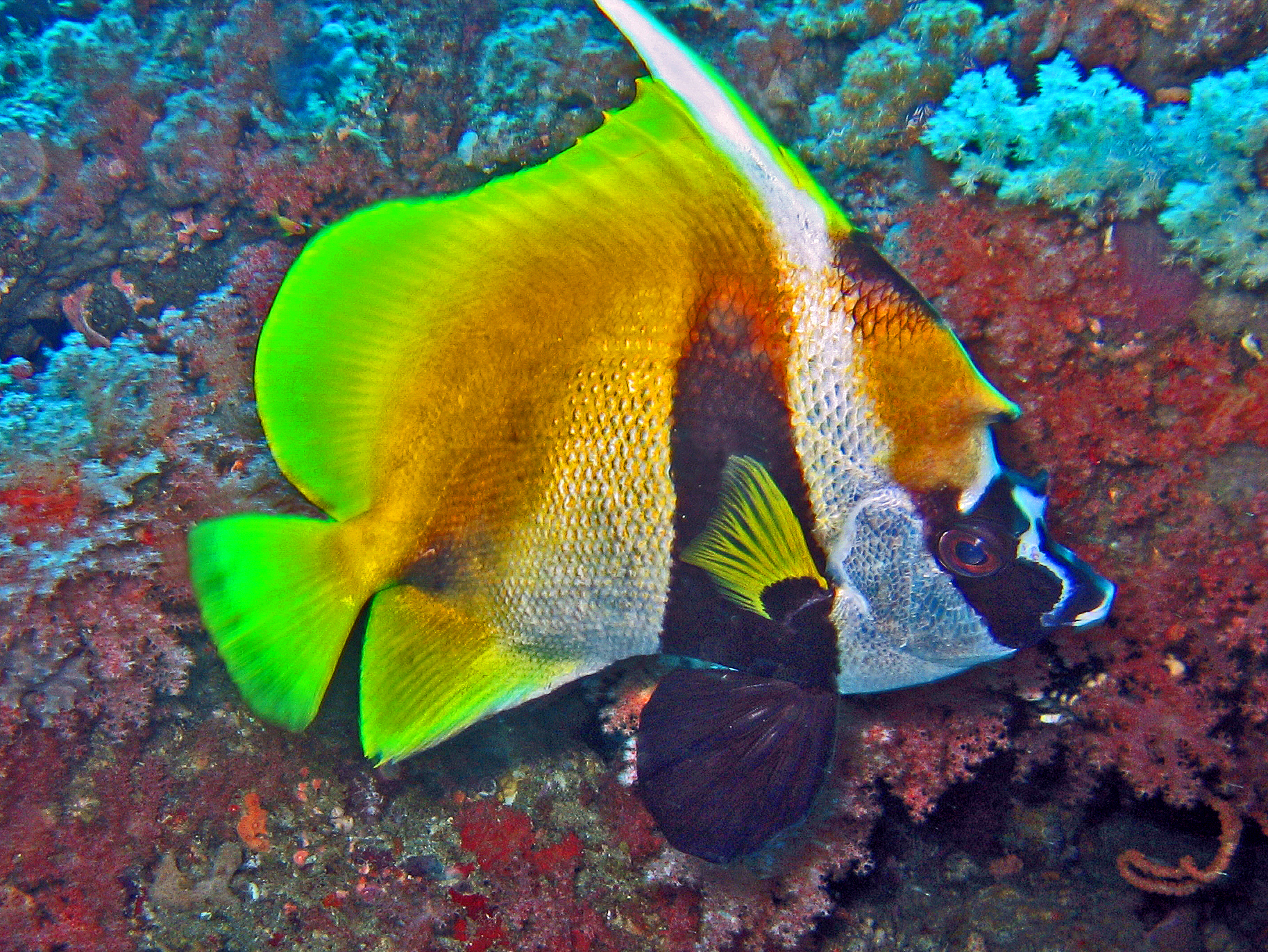
- Heniochus monoceros from Maldives

Conservation status
- Least Concern (IUCN 3.1)

Scientific classification
- Kingdom: Animalia
- Phylum: Chordata
- Class: Actinopterygii
- Order: Acanthuriformes
- Family: Chaetodontidae
- Genus: Heniochus
- Species: H. monoceros

Binomial name
- Heniochus monoceros G. Cuvier, 1831

Synonyms
- Taurichthys monoceros (Cuvier, 1831)

= Heniochus monoceros =

Species of fish

Heniochus monoceros, the masked bannerfish, is a marine ray-finned fish, a butterflyfish belonging to the family Chaetodontidae. It is found in the Indo-Pacific area.

== Description ==
The masked bannerfish is a small-sized fish that can reach a maximum length of 23 cm. Its body is compressed laterally, the first rays of its dorsal fin stretch in a white filament outlined with yellow. The background body color is white with two black vertical bands. The first band masks its face starting at its mouth, and runs to the base of the first rays of the dorsal fin including at the same time its snout and eyes. The lips are white and a fin whitish band runs between the eyes and another one occurs on top of the eyes. the masked bannerfish has a small growth on the axis of the forehead from which radiates a bright whitish to yellowish area. The second band is right in the middle of the fish side. A yellow area extends from the posterior edge of the second black band to the middle of the anal fin including on the way the dorsal and caudal fins. Within this yellow area close to the caudal peduncle, a brown-yellow blotch, variable in size from one fish to another, emerges.

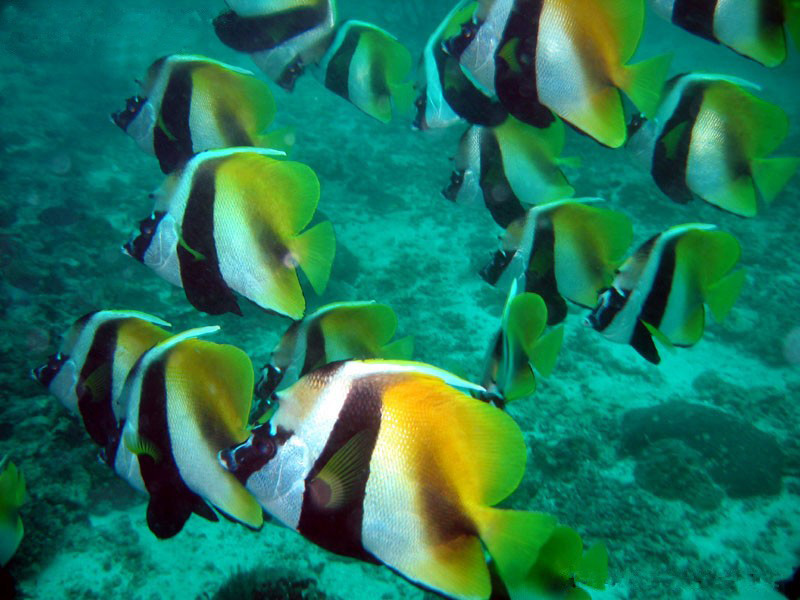
Heniochus monoceros

== Distribution & habitat ==
The masked bannerfish is widespread throughout the tropical and subtropical waters of the Indo-Pacific area from the eastern coast of Africa to Polynesia and from south Japan to New-Caledonia).

The masked bannerfish typically lives in external reef slopes and in lagoon rich in corals, at a depth of 2–30 metres (6 ft 7 in – 98 ft 5 in).

== Biology ==
Depending on the geographic area, the masked bannerfish lives in pairs or in groups (i.e. especially along island reefs in the Indian Ocean) but always close by its shelter reef and feeds on benthic invertebrates.

== Conservation status ==
In some geographic area the masked bannerfish is harvested occasionally for the aquarium trade. However, there do not appear to be any current threats to this species and it is listed as Least Concern (LC) by the IUCN.
