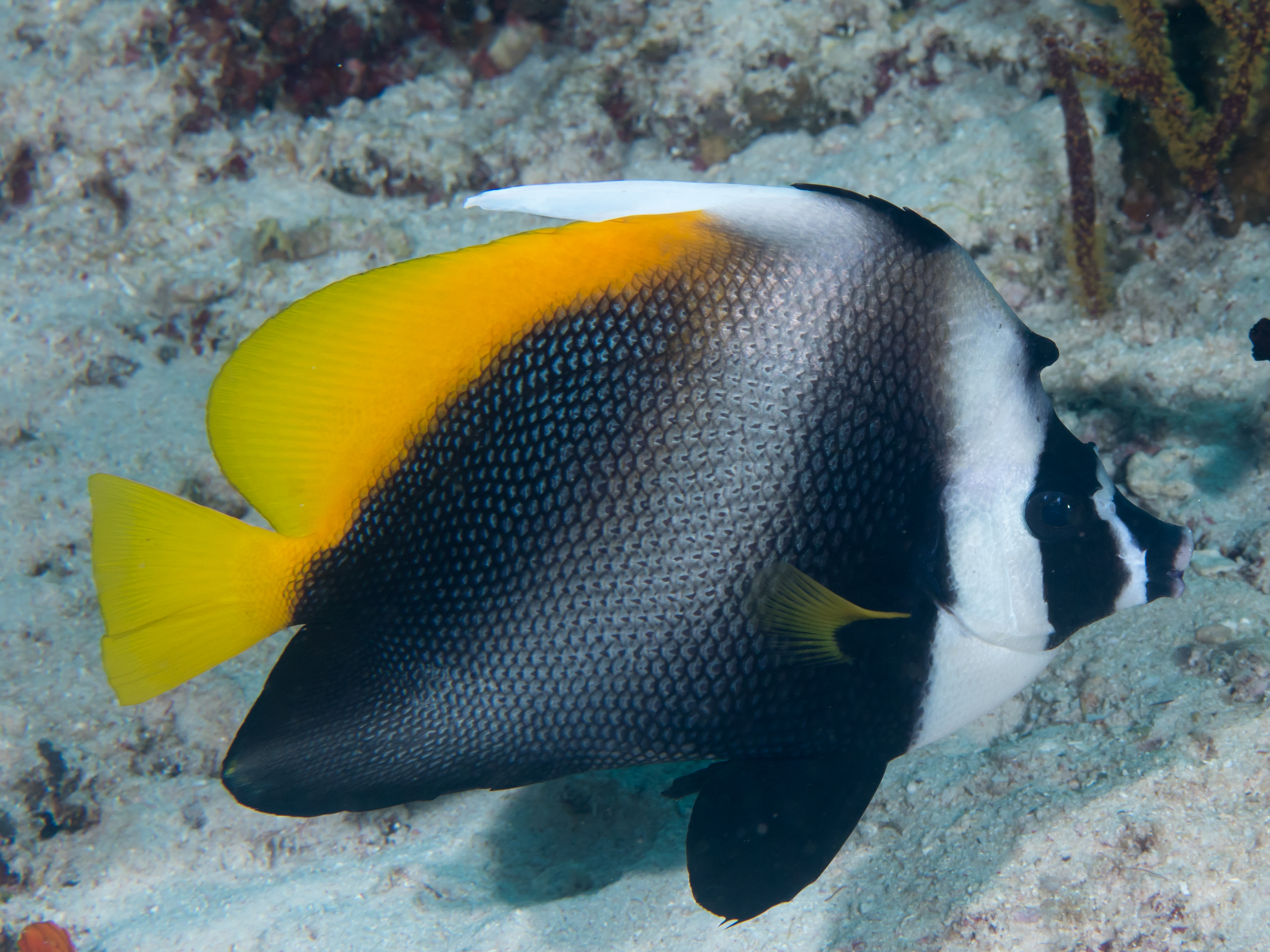

Conservation status
- Least Concern (IUCN 3.1)

Scientific classification
- Kingdom: Animalia
- Phylum: Chordata
- Class: Actinopterygii
- Division: Teleostei
- Order: Acanthuriformes
- Family: Chaetodontidae
- Genus: Heniochus
- Species: H. singularius

Binomial name
- Heniochus singularius H. M. Smith & Radcliffe, 1911

= Heniochus singularius =

Species of fish

Heniochus singularius, the singular bannerfish, is a species of marine ray-finned fish, a butterflyfish from the family Chaetodontidae. It is found in the Indo-Pacific region.

== Description ==
Heniochus singularius adults and juveniles are rather different in appearance, the juveniles have the 4th spine of the spiny part of the dorsal fin elongated to form a white banner and this makes its triangular shape more obvious. The adults have a less lengthy banner, giving them a fuller shape which more closely resembles the typical butterflyfish shape. The colour pattern on the body starts with a white band encircling the mouth, then there are a number of black bands. These include an eye stripe which runs from above the eye to the chin. Following the eye stripe there is a band in the middle of the body to the front of the dorsal fin. The final black band runs diagonally from the start of the soft-rayed part of the dorsal fin to the rear of the anal fin. The soft rayed part of the dorsal fin and the caudal fin are bright canary yellow. In the adults the body between the black bands has a fine reticulated pattern. There is a bony bump on the head. The dorsal fin contains 11–12 spines and 25–27 soft rays while the anal fin has 3 spines and 17–18 soft rays. This species attains a maximum total length of 30 centimetres (12 in) and is the largest species of the genus Heniochus.

== Distribution ==
Heniochus singularius has a wide Indo-Pacific distribution which extends from the central Indian Ocean around the Maldives and the Chagos Islands east to Samoa. The range extends north to southern Japan and south to northern Australia. In Australia it is found from Shark Bay to the Dampier Archipelago and the offshore reefs of Western Australia, and along the northern Great Barrier Reef south as far as Moreton Bay in Queensland; it also occurs at Christmas Island.

== Habitat and biology ==
Heniochus singularius is found along coastal, inner and outer reef slopes. It shows a preference for areas with plentiful coral growth and varied topography. The juveniles are normally found in shallow lagoons, but may also be found in deeper water in the vicinity of caves and rock shelters. They feed on coral polyps, possibly including live coral, benthic invertebrates and algae. They are oviparous and form pairs to breed.

== Taxonomy ==
Heniochus singularius was first formally described in 1911 by the American zoologists Hugh McCormick Smith and Lewis Radcliffe with the type locality given as Alibijaban in Ragay Gulf of Luzon in the Philippines.

== Utilisation ==
Heniochus singularius is uncommon in the wild and is also uncommon in the aquarium trade.
