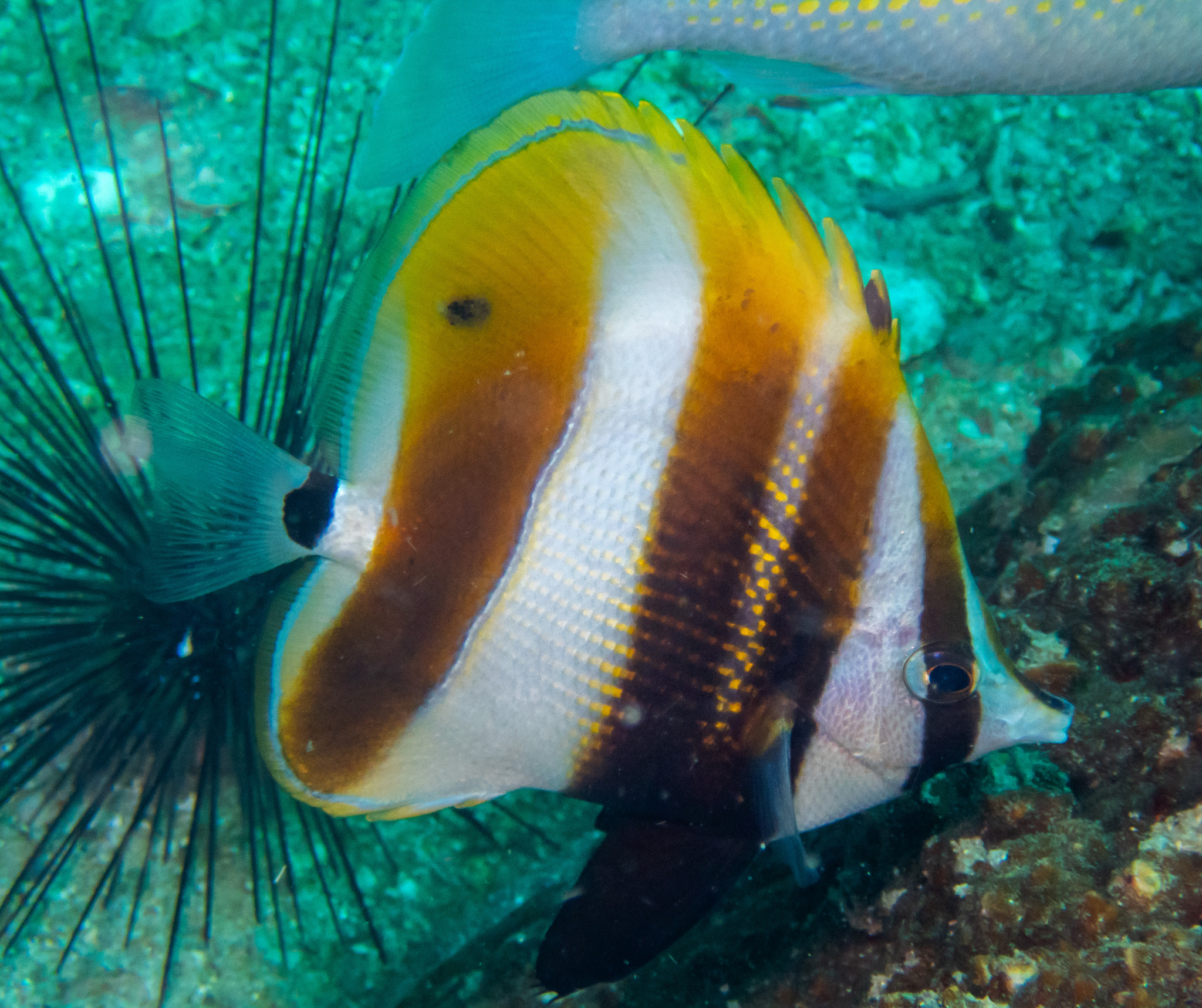

Conservation status
- Least Concern (IUCN 3.1)

Scientific classification
- Kingdom: Animalia
- Phylum: Chordata
- Class: Actinopterygii
- Order: Acanthuriformes
- Family: Chaetodontidae
- Genus: Coradion
- Species: C. altivelis

Binomial name
- Coradion altivelis McCulloch, 1916

Synonyms
- Coradion fulvocinctus Tanaka, 1918

= Coradion altivelis =

Species of fish

Coradion altivelis, the highfin coralfish or highfin butterflyfish, is a species of marine ray-finned fish, a butterflyfish from the family Chaetodontidae. It is found in the Indo-West Pacific region from the Andaman Sea and Sumatra east to Papua New Guinea, north to southern Japan, south to northwest Australia and the Great Barrier Reef.

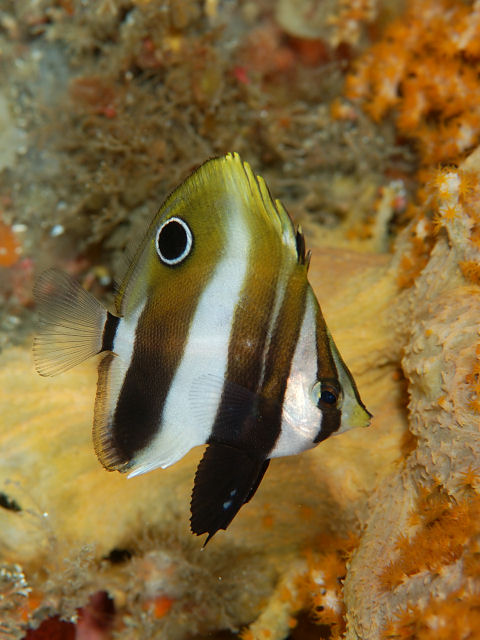
Juvenile

This species can be found in coastal habitats including the seaward side of reefs, drop offs and quite shallow waters with silty substrates. They are omnivorous, although sponges comprise the major part of their diet. They form pairs for breeding.
