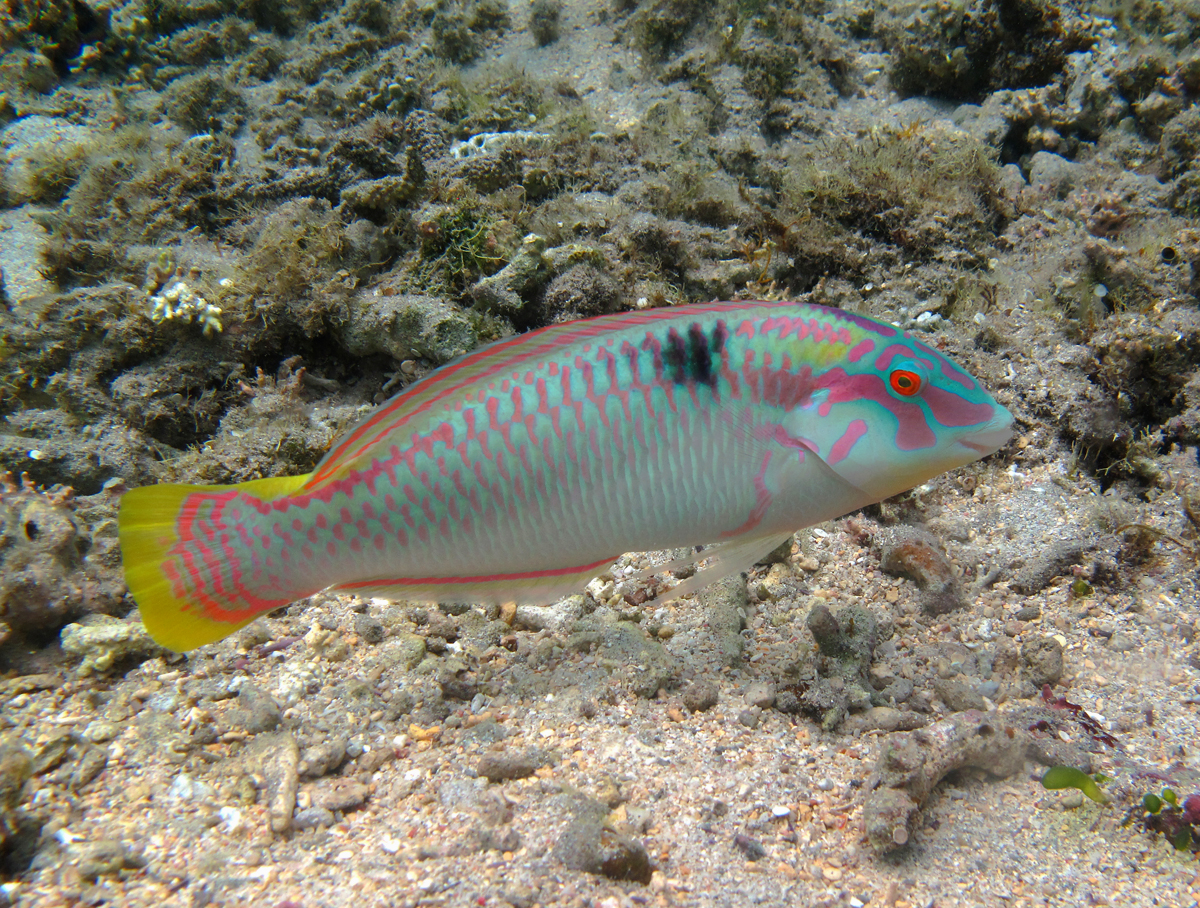

Conservation status
- Least Concern (IUCN 3.1)

Scientific classification
- Kingdom: Animalia
- Phylum: Chordata
- Class: Actinopterygii
- Order: Labriformes
- Family: Labridae
- Genus: Halichoeres
- Species: H. scapularis

Binomial name
- Halichoeres scapularis (Bennett, 1832)

Synonyms
- Julis scapularis Bennett, 1832

= Halichoeres scapularis =

Species of fish

Halichoeres scapularis, commonly called the zigzag wrasse, is a species of marine ray-finned fish in the family Labridae. It is native to the Indo-West Pacific.

== Description ==
The zigzag wrasse is a relatively small fish, with a maximum length of 20 cm (7.9 in). It has a thin, elongate body with a terminal mouth. A juvenile or female zigzag wrasse has a pearly white background with a black or yellow stripe zigzagging along the lateral line, and the body coloration of males is much more elaborated: the inferior side of the lateral line is pearly with pinkish reflection, the aforementioned black or yellow stripe along the lateral line is present (but tends to disappear with age or may be reduced to a short dash), and the superior side is greenish with pink accents until the base of the dorsal fin, which is bright yellow. Superimposed over this yellow line is a blue line, a yellow line, green line and finally a pinkish one, in that order. The irises are orange.

== Distribution and habitat ==
The zigzag wrasse is widespread throughout the tropical and subtropical waters of the Indo-West Pacific, from the eastern coast of Africa, Red Sea included, to the Philippines, and from New Caledonia to southern Japan.

The zigzag wrasse appreciates mixed areas of top reef (sand/rubble/corals) in shallow water down to 20 meters depth.

== Biology ==
The zigzag wrasse can live in small groups, but is usually solitary and may even be aggressive towards conspecifics. Like most other wrasses, the zigzag wrasse is a protogynous hermaphrodite, with all individuals starting life as female with the capability of switching sex later on.

== Conservation status ==
The species is targeted but not thought to be threatened by the aquarium trade, and is listed as a Least Concern (LC) species by the IUCN.
