= Narrow-barred butterflyfish =

Conservation status
- Data Deficient (IUCN 3.1)

Scientific classification
- Kingdom: Animalia
- Phylum: Chordata
- Class: Actinopterygii
- Order: Acanthuriformes
- Family: Chaetodontidae
- Genus: Amphichaetodon
- Species: A. melbae

Binomial name
- Amphichaetodon melbae W. E. Burgess & D. K. Caldwell, 1978

Species of fish

The narrow-banded butterflyfish (Amphichaetodon melbae) is a species of marine ray-finned fish, a butterflyfish from the family Chaetodontidae. It is found in the eastern Pacific Ocean around Easter Island, the Desventuradas Islands and the Juan Fernández Islands/ The biology of this fish is little understood but it is thought to be strongly associated with rocky reefs. The name of the person honoured in the specific name was not defined but it is considered to, almost certainly, be D.K. Cladwell's wife, the marine mammalogist Melba Caldwell of the University of Florida in Gainesville.
