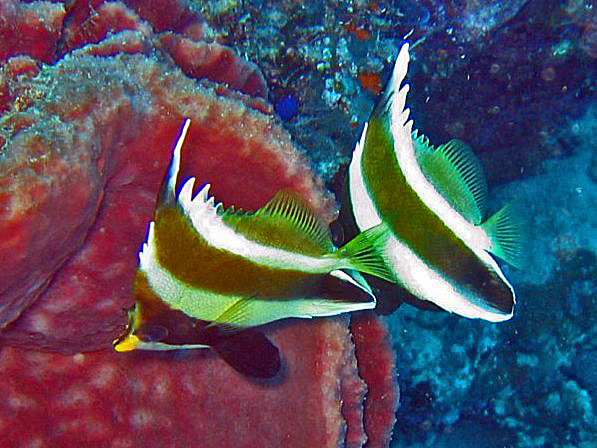
- Heniochus chrysostomus from Borneo

Conservation status
- Least Concern (IUCN 3.1)

Scientific classification
- Kingdom: Animalia
- Phylum: Chordata
- Class: Actinopterygii
- Order: Acanthuriformes
- Family: Chaetodontidae
- Genus: Heniochus
- Species: H. chrysostomus

Binomial name
- Heniochus chrysostomus G. Cuvier, 1831

Synonyms
- Chaetodon teatae Curtiss, 1938; Heniochus drepanoides Thiollière, 1857; Heniochus melanistion Bleeker, 1854; Heniochus permutatus Cuvier, 1831

= Heniochus chrysostomus =

Species of fish

Heniochus chrysostomus, also known as the threeband pennantfish, threeband bannerfish or pennant bannerfish, is a marine ray-finned fish, a butterflyfish from the family Chaetodontidae. It is found in the Indo-Pacific region.

== Distribution ==
Heniochus chrysostomus is widespread throughout the tropical and subtropical waters of the central Indo-Pacific from the western coast of India to Polynesia and from south Japan to New-Caledonia.

== Habitat ==
Heniochus chrysostomus typically inhabits coral-rich areas of reef flats, lagoon and seaward reefs at a depth of 2–40 metres (6 ft 7 in – 131 ft 3 in). Juveniles are usually found in lagoons and estuaries.

== Description ==
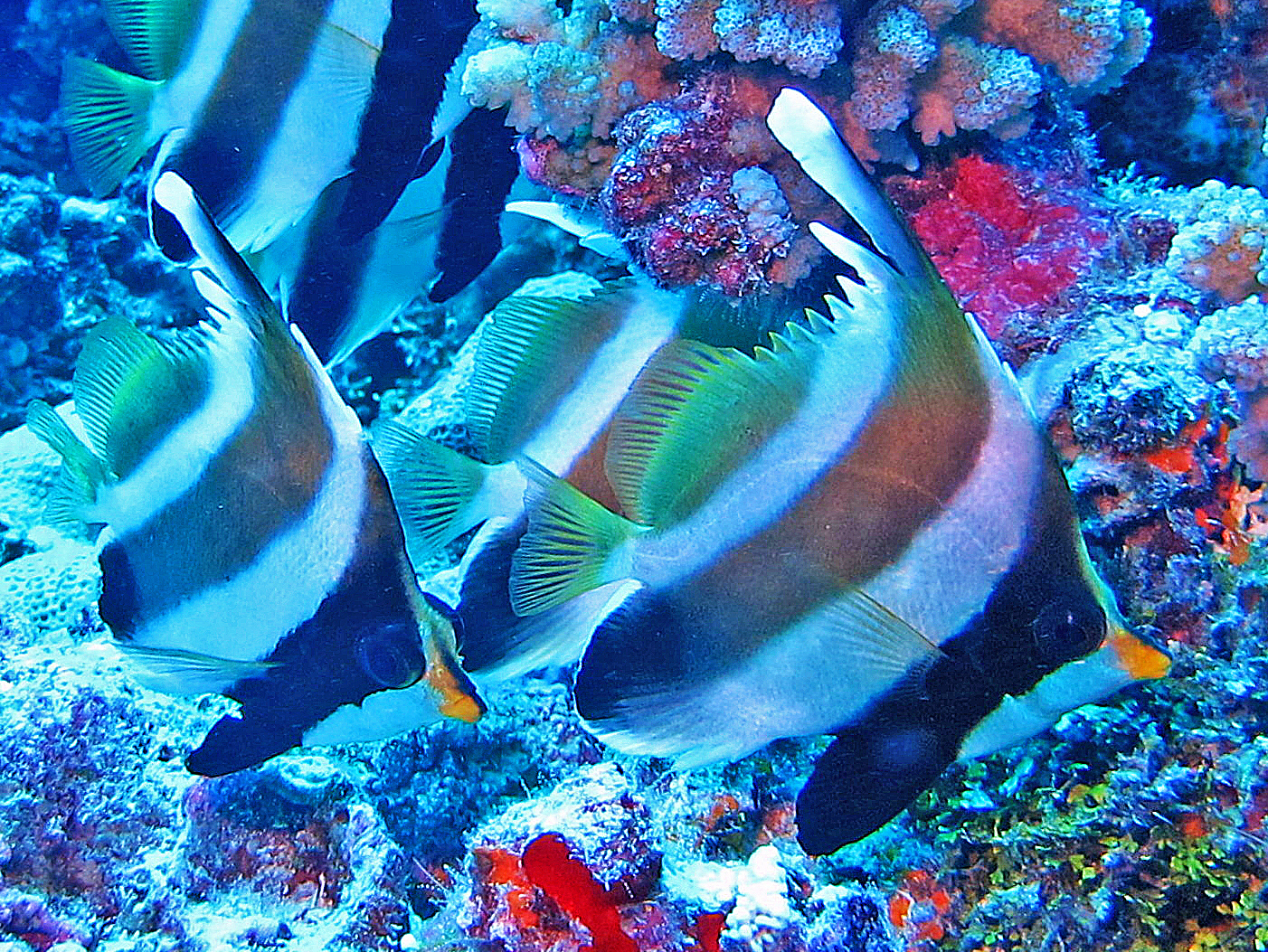
Heniochus chrysostomus from French Polynesia

Heniochus chrysostomus is a small-sized fish that can reach a maximum length of 18 cm. The body is laterally strongly flattened, with a basic white color and three broad oblique brown bands. The first dark brown band runs from the forehead up to the ventral fins, the second from the dorsal fin to the anal fin, the third is adjacent to the dorsal fin. The first rays of the dorsal fin is elongated and looks like a black and white feather.

Head shows a short snout and a small protractile mouth. This bannerfish has a distinctive yellow coloration pattern on the mouth, top of the snout and running between its eyes. The posterior part of its dorsal fin, its caudal fin and the pectoral fins are orange-yellow. Juveniles have an ocellus which is a black spot rimmed with orange-yellow, on the bottom of its anal fin.

== Biology ==
Heniochus chrysostomus form pairs during breeding. They mainly fed on coral polyps. Juveniles are solitary.

== Conservation status ==
Heniochus chrysostomus is subject to some fishing activities to collect some specimen for aquarium, there do not appear to be any current threats to this species. However, it is listed as Least Concern (LC) by the IUCN.
