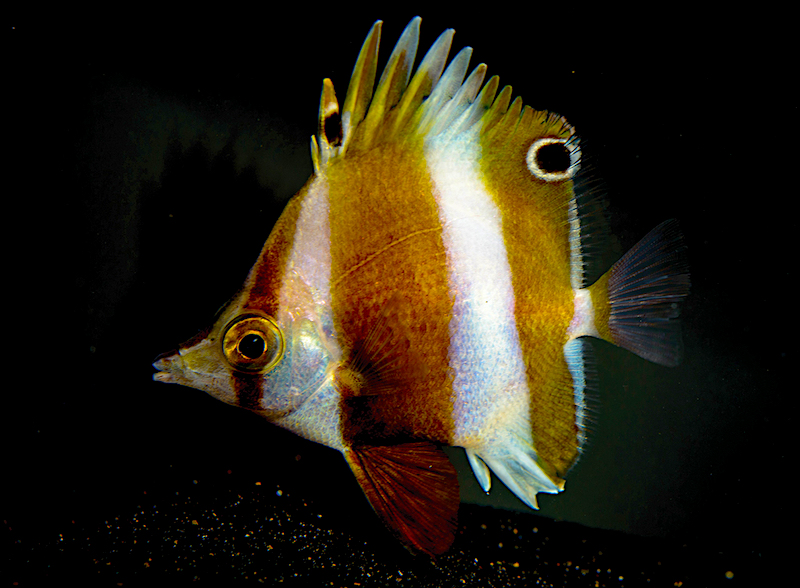

Scientific classification
- Kingdom: Animalia
- Phylum: Chordata
- Class: Actinopterygii
- Order: Acanthuriformes
- Family: Chaetodontidae
- Genus: Roa
- Species: R. rumsfeldi

Binomial name
- Roa rumsfeldi Rocha, Pinheiro, Wandell, Rocha & Shepherd, 2017

= Roa rumsfeldi =

Species of fish

Roa rumsfeldi is a species of marine ray-finned fish, a butterflyfish belonging to the family Chaetodontidae. It is the fifth known species of the genus Roa and was discovered in Anilao, Philippines in 2016. This species has vertical white and brown stripes and has a black spine on the ventral fin contrary to the other Roa specimens.

== Etymology ==
The specific name honours the former US Secretary of Defense Donald Rumsfeld, because his quote “there are known knowns; there are things we know we know. We also know there are known unknowns; that is to say we know there are some things we do not know. But there are also unknown unknowns – the ones we don’t know we don’t know” applies to the describers view on what is known about mesophotic fish species.
