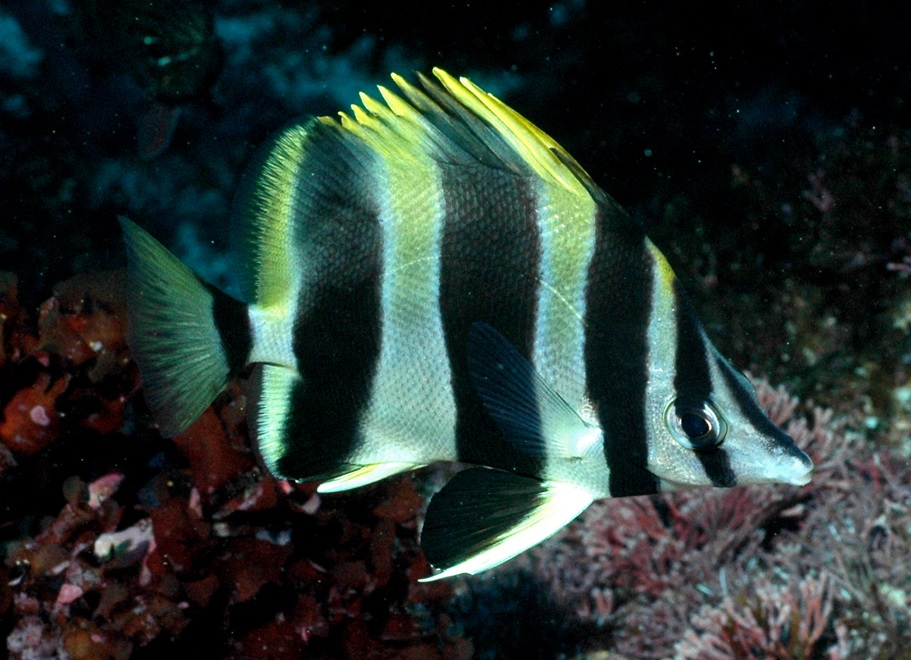

Conservation status
- Least Concern (IUCN 3.1)

Scientific classification
- Kingdom: Animalia
- Phylum: Chordata
- Class: Actinopterygii
- Order: Acanthuriformes
- Family: Chaetodontidae
- Genus: Amphichaetodon
- Species: A. howensis

Binomial name
- Amphichaetodon howensis (Waite, 1903)

Synonyms
- Chaetodon howensis Waite, 1903

= Lord Howe Island butterflyfish =

Species of fish

The Lord Howe Island butterflyfish (Amphichaetodon howensis) is a butterflyfish of the family Chaetodontidae, found along the east coast of Australia, around Lord Howe Island, and down the east coast of Northland in New Zealand, at depths of between 10 and 150 m. They are up to 20 cm long with black and yellow/white vertical stripes.
