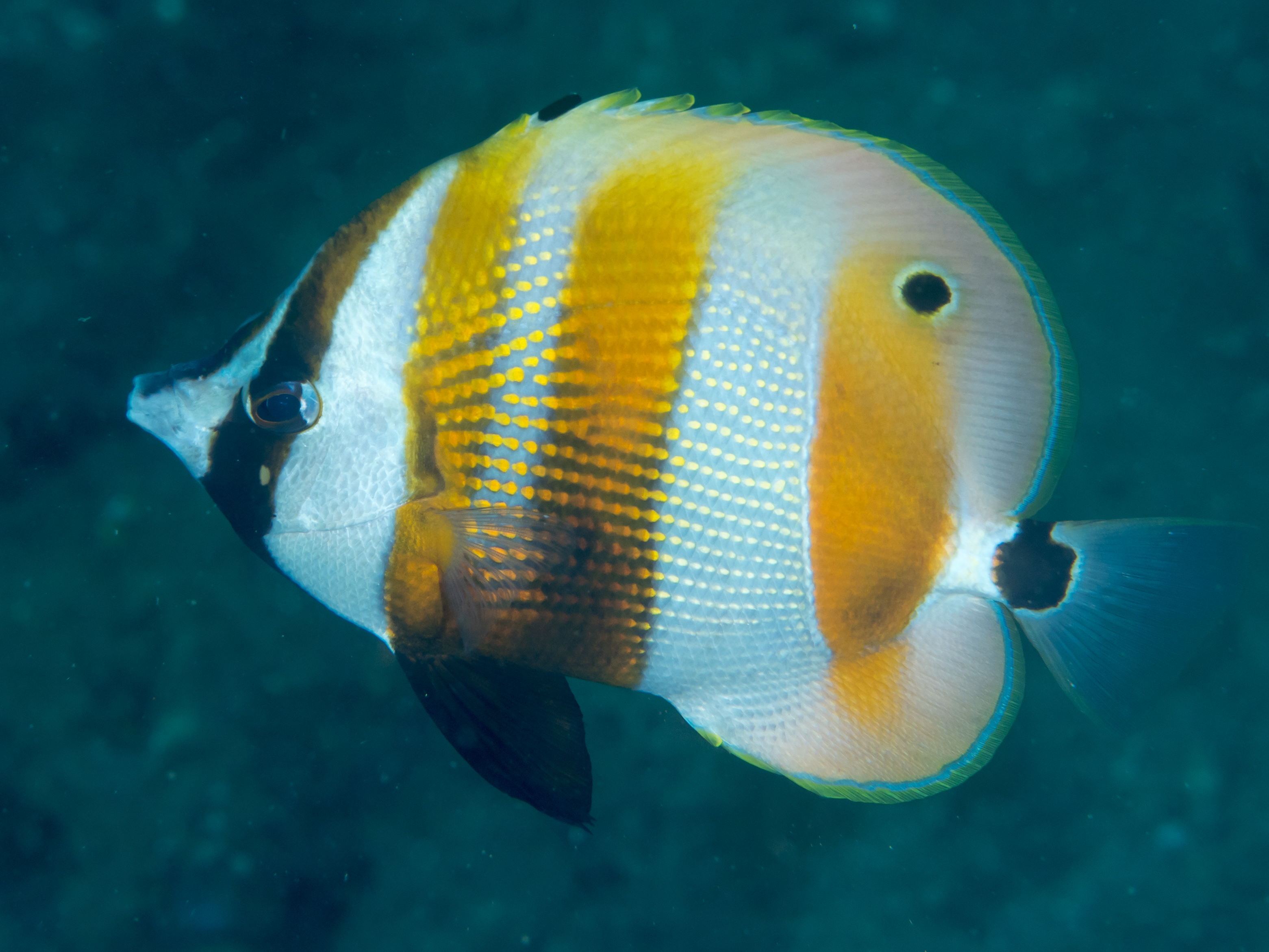

Conservation status
- Least Concern (IUCN 3.1)

Scientific classification
- Kingdom: Animalia
- Phylum: Chordata
- Class: Actinopterygii
- Order: Acanthuriformes
- Family: Chaetodontidae
- Genus: Coradion
- Species: C. chrysozonus

Binomial name
- Coradion chrysozonus (Cuvier, 1831)

Synonyms
- Chaetodon chrysozonus Cuvier, 1831; Chaetodon labiatus Cuvier, 1831; Chaetodon guttatus Gronow, 1854

= Coradion chrysozonus =

Species of fish

Coradion chrysozonus, the orangebanded coralfish or goldengirdled coralfish, is a species of marine ray-finned fish, a butterflyfish from the family Chaetodontidae. It is found in the Indo-Pacific with a distribution consisting of colonies scattered along the coast of Queensland, the Frankland Group off north Queensland west to Western Australia, New Guinea; Indonesia and the Philippines. It is rare along the Chinese coast and had recently been recorded from Tonga.

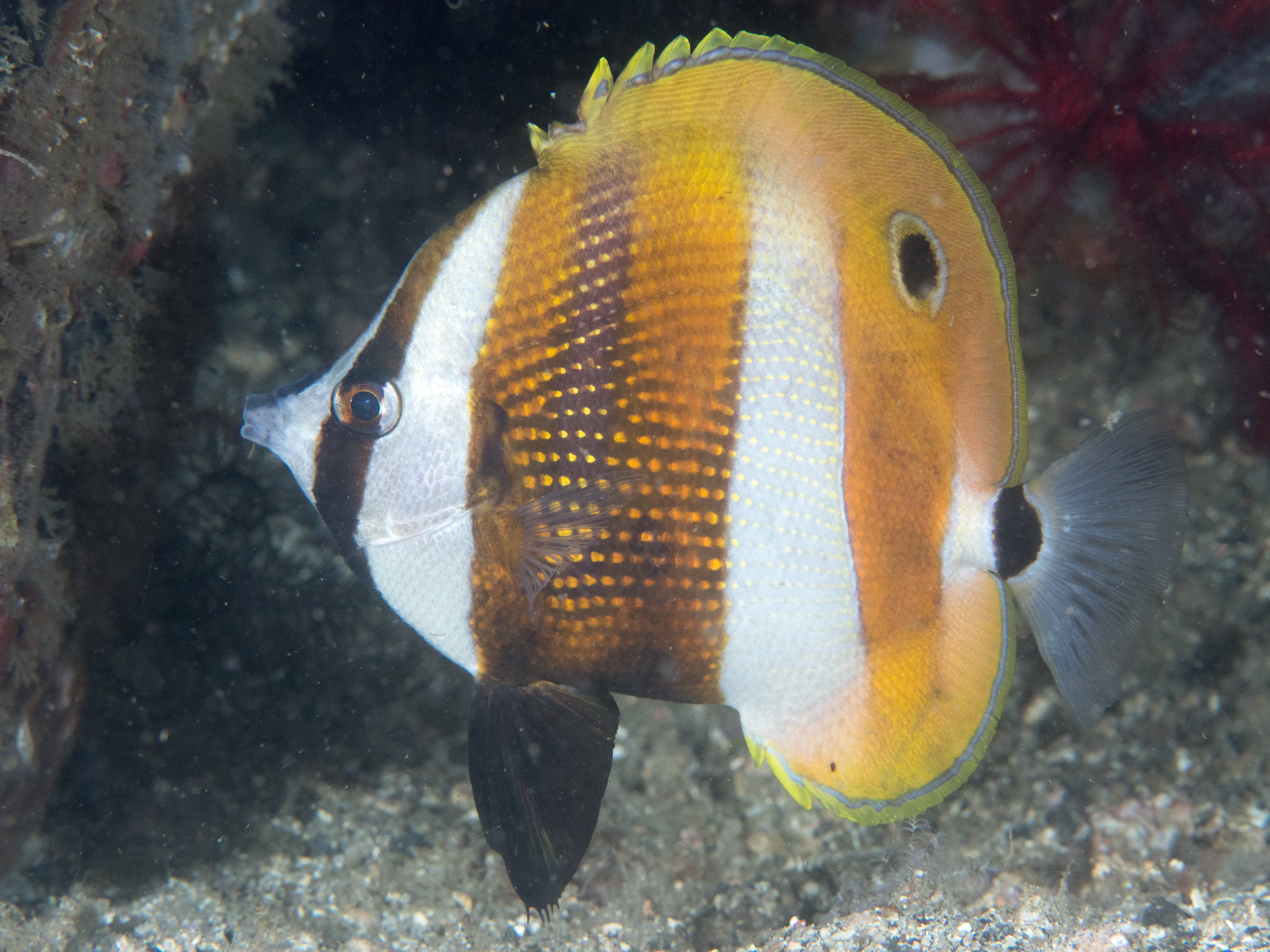
In Indonesia

It is normally encountered as solitary individuals or in pairs which inhabit a range of coastal to outer reefs habitats and which have rich growths of invertebrates. This species may prefer reefs in deeper cooler water. It is an omnivorous species which feeds mainly on sponges but also on small invertebrates which it grazes off the surface of the sponges.
