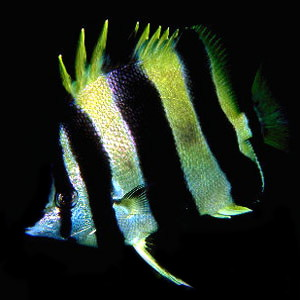
- Lord Howe Island butterflyfish (A. howensis)

Scientific classification
- Kingdom: Animalia
- Phylum: Chordata
- Class: Actinopterygii
- Order: Acanthuriformes
- Family: Chaetodontidae
- Genus: Amphichaetodon; W. E. Burgess, 1978

Type species
- Amphichaetodon melbae W. E. Burgess & D. K. Caldwell, 1978

Species
- 2

= Amphichaetodon =

Genus of fishes

Amphichaetodon is a genus of marine ray-finned fish in the family Chaetodontidae, the butterflyfishes. They are native to the southern Pacific Ocean.

== Species ==
There are currently two recognized species in this genus:

- Amphichaetodon howensis (Waite, 1903) – Lord Howe Island butterflyfish
- Amphichaetodon melbae W. E. Burgess & D. K. Caldwell, 1978 – narrow-barred butterflyfish
