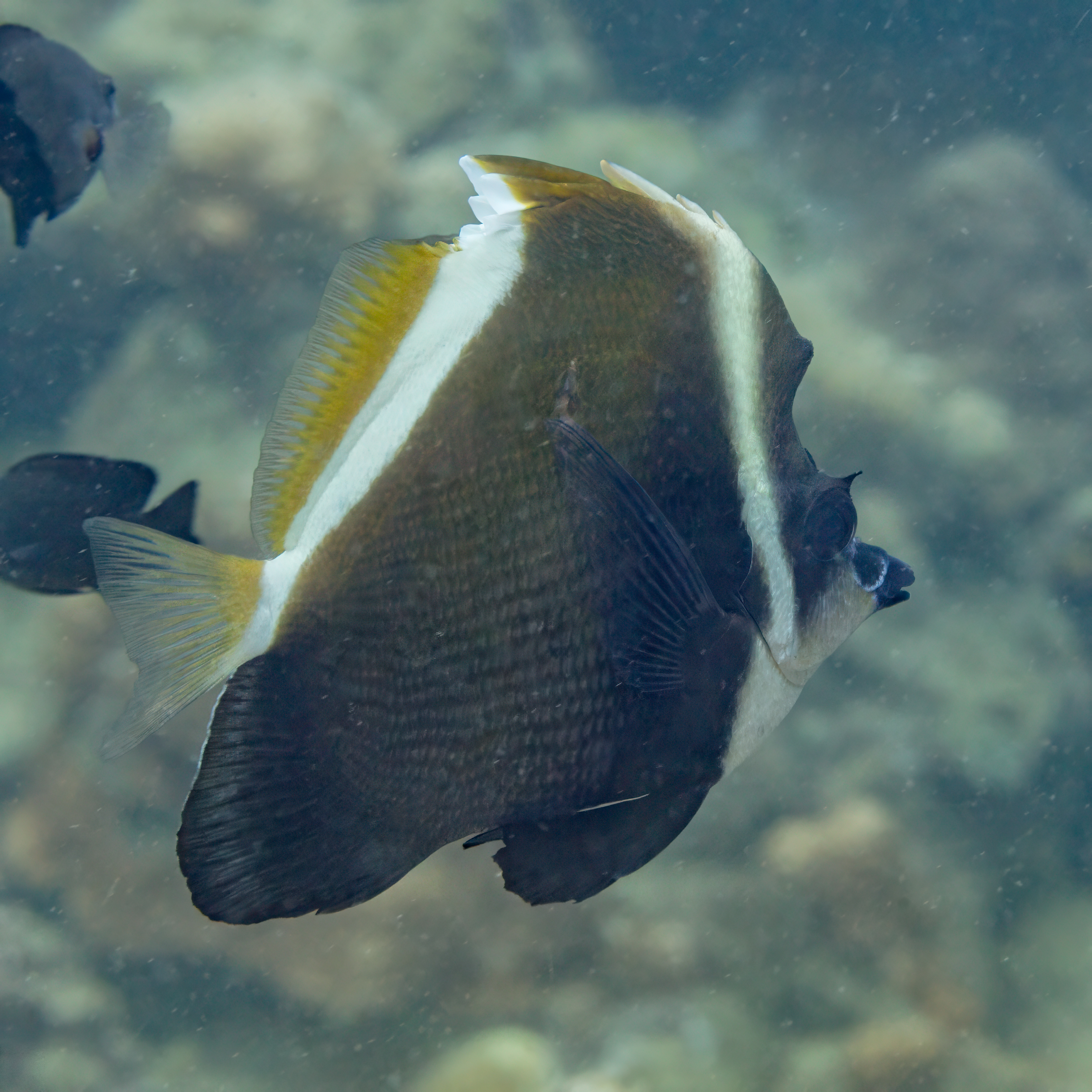

Conservation status
- Least Concern (IUCN 3.1)

Scientific classification
- Kingdom: Animalia
- Phylum: Chordata
- Class: Actinopterygii
- Division: Teleostei
- Order: Acanthuriformes
- Family: Chaetodontidae
- Genus: Heniochus
- Species: H. varius

Binomial name
- Heniochus varius (Cuvier, 1829)

Synonyms
- Taurichthys varius Cuvier, 1829; Taurichthys viridis Cuvier, 1831; Taurichthys bleekeri Castelnau, 1875

= Heniochus varius =

Species of fish

Heniochus varius, the horned bannerfish or humphead bannerfish, is a species of marine ray-finned fish, a butterflyfish belonging to the family Chaetodontidae, native from the central Indo-Pacific area.

== Description ==
The horned bannerfish is a small-sized fish that can reach a maximum length of 19 centimetres (7.5 in). It has the typical deep-bodied and highly compressed body, typical of butterflyfishes.

The horned bannerfish is told apart from its congeners by the adults having a pair of obvious horns on the forehead, just above the eyes and a prominent bump on the forehead. The predominant colour on the body is brown to blackish broken by a thin white band behind the head and a second running from the spiny part of the dorsal fin to the caudal peduncle. The two white stripes create a triangle of the base colour on the body. The dorsal fin has 11 spines and 22–25 soft rays while the anal fin contains 3 spines and 17–18 soft rays.

== Distribution and habitat ==
The horned bannerfish is widespread throughout the tropical and subtropical waters of the central Indo-Pacific from Indonesia to Polynesia and from south Japan to New-Caledonia.

It inhabits areas rich in coral in shallow lagoons and external reef slopes from the surface to a depth of 30 meters.

== Biology ==
The horned bannerfish is a solitary fish but it can live in pairs or even in small groups. Its diet is varied and consists of coral polyps and various benthic invertebrates.

== Taxonomy ==
Heniochus varius was first formally described as Taurichthys varius in 1829 by the French anatomist Georges Cuvier (1769–1832) with the type locality given as Ambon Island in Indonesia.

== Conservation status ==
In some geographic areas, the horned bannerfish is occasionally harvested for the aquarium trade; however, the species does not currently appear threatened and is listed as least concern (LC) by the IUCN.
