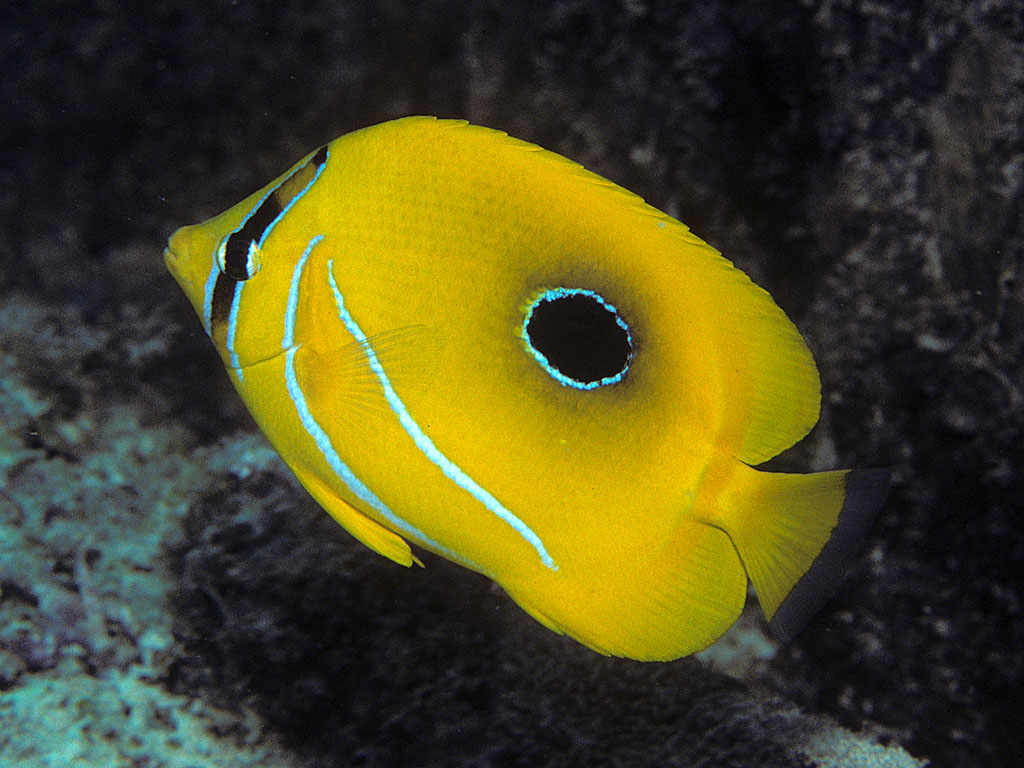

Conservation status
- Data Deficient (IUCN 3.1)

Scientific classification
- Kingdom: Animalia
- Phylum: Chordata
- Class: Actinopterygii
- Order: Acanthuriformes
- Family: Chaetodontidae
- Genus: Chaetodon
- Subgenus: Chaetodon (Tetrachaetodon)
- Species: C. bennetti

Binomial name
- Chaetodon bennetti G. Cuvier, 1831

Synonyms
- Chaetodon vinctus Lay & Bennett, 1839

= Bluelashed butterflyfish =

Species of fish

The bluelashed butterflyfish (Chaetodon bennetti), also known as the eclipse butterflyfish, archer butterflyfish or Bennett's butterflyfish, is a species of marine ray-finned fish, a butterflyfish belonging to the family Chaetodontidae, It is found in the Indo-Pacific.

== Description ==
The bluelashed butterflyfish has a body which is yellow with a black patch surrounded by a blue circle below the dorsal fin and two curved blue lines above the belly. Its vertical black eyestripe is flanked by two blue lines. The dorsal fin contains 13–14 spines and 15–17 soft rays while the anal fin has 3 spines and 14–16 soft rays. This species attains a maximum total length of 20 centimetres (7.9 in).

== Distribution ==
The bluelashed butterflyfish has a wide Indo-Pacific range. In the eastern Indian Ocean they are found along the eastern coast of Africa from Somalia to South Africa and across the Indian Ocean as far north as India and Sri Lanka and into the Pacific Ocean where they extend as far north as Kashiwa-jima in southern Japan, south to Lord Howe Island and east to Mangarava in French Polynesia. In Australia this species occurs on the Indian Ocean territories of the Cocos (Keeling) Islands and Christmas Island. In Western Australia it is found at the Rowley Shoals and Scott Reef. They are also found at the Ashmore Reef in the Timor Sea, the northern Great Barrier Reef in Queensland south to Moreton Bay,

== Habitat and biology ==
The bluelashed butterflyfish is found in seaward and lagoon reefs in areas with rich coral growth. Juveniles may be found in shallow Acropora thickets. Adults occur in pairs. This species feeds largely on coral polyps.

== Systematics ==
The bluelashed butterflyfish was first formally described in 1831 by the French anatomist Georges Cuvier (1769–1832). The specific name honours the English naturalist Edward Turner Bennett (1797–1836) who had the type specimen of this species shown to Cuvier.

Like the other butterflyfishes with angular yellow bodies with black eyestripes and, except for this species which is regarded as the most basal of them, a single differently-colored patch, it belongs in the subgenus Tetrachaetodon. Among this group it seems to be the most basal living species. If Chaetodon is split up, this subgenus would be placed in Megaprotodon.
