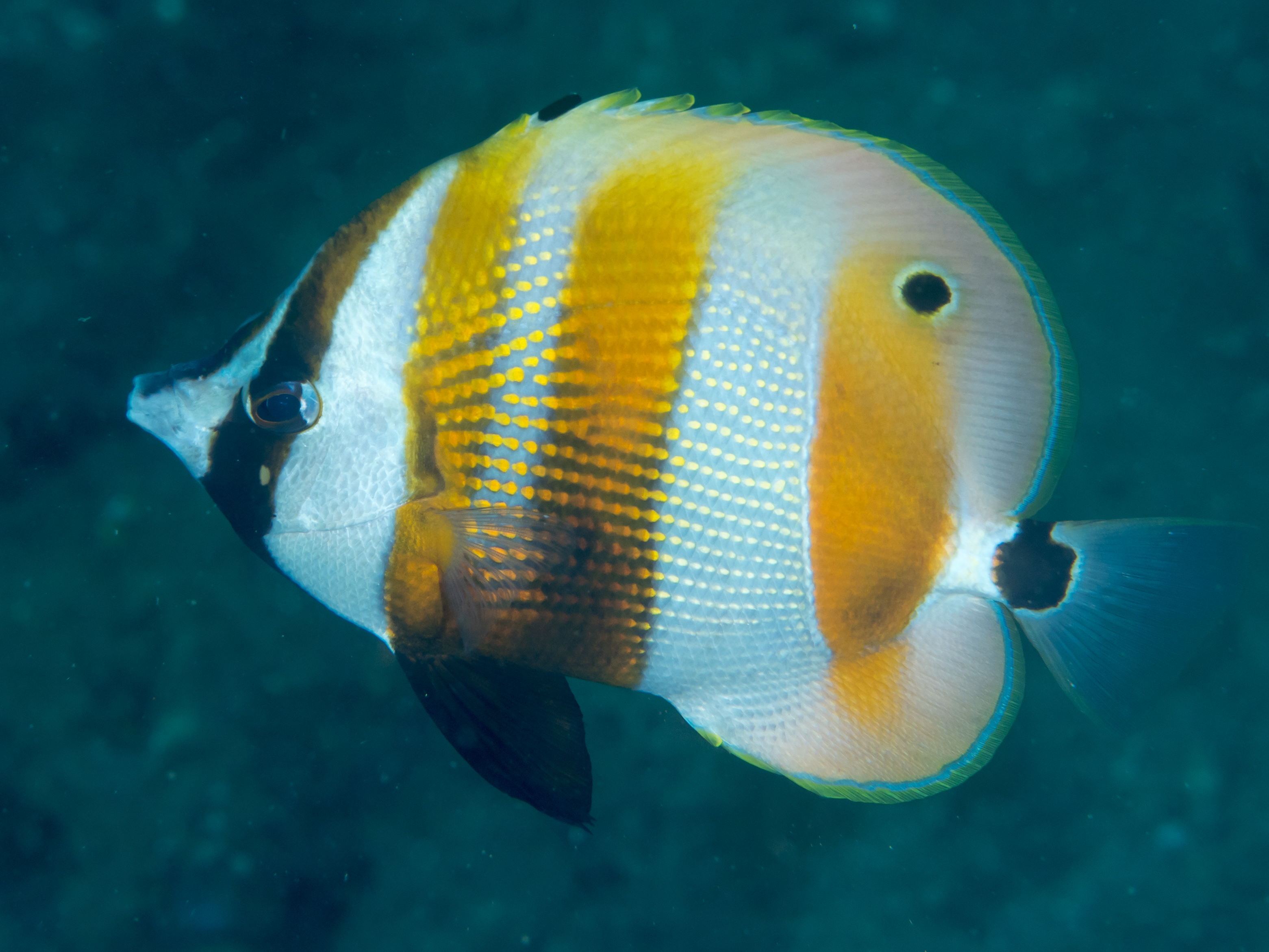
- Goldengirdled coralfish (C. chrysozonus)

Scientific classification
- Kingdom: Animalia
- Phylum: Chordata
- Class: Actinopterygii
- Order: Acanthuriformes
- Family: Chaetodontidae
- Genus: Coradion; Kaup, 1860

Type species
- Chaetodon chrysozonus Cuvier, 1831

= Coradion =

Genus of fishes

Coradion is a genus of marine ray-finned fish in the family Chaetodontidae, the butterflyfishes. They are native to the Indian and Pacific Oceans.

== Species ==
There are currently four recognized species in this genus:

- Coradion altivelis McCulloch, 1916 – highfin coralfish
- Coradion calendula Matsunuma, Tatsuya Matsumoto, Motomura, Ying Giat Seah & Tun Nurul Aimi Mat Jaafar, 2023
- Coradion chrysozonus (G. Cuvier, 1831) – goldengirdled coralfish
- Coradion melanopus (G. Cuvier, 1831) – twospot coralfish
