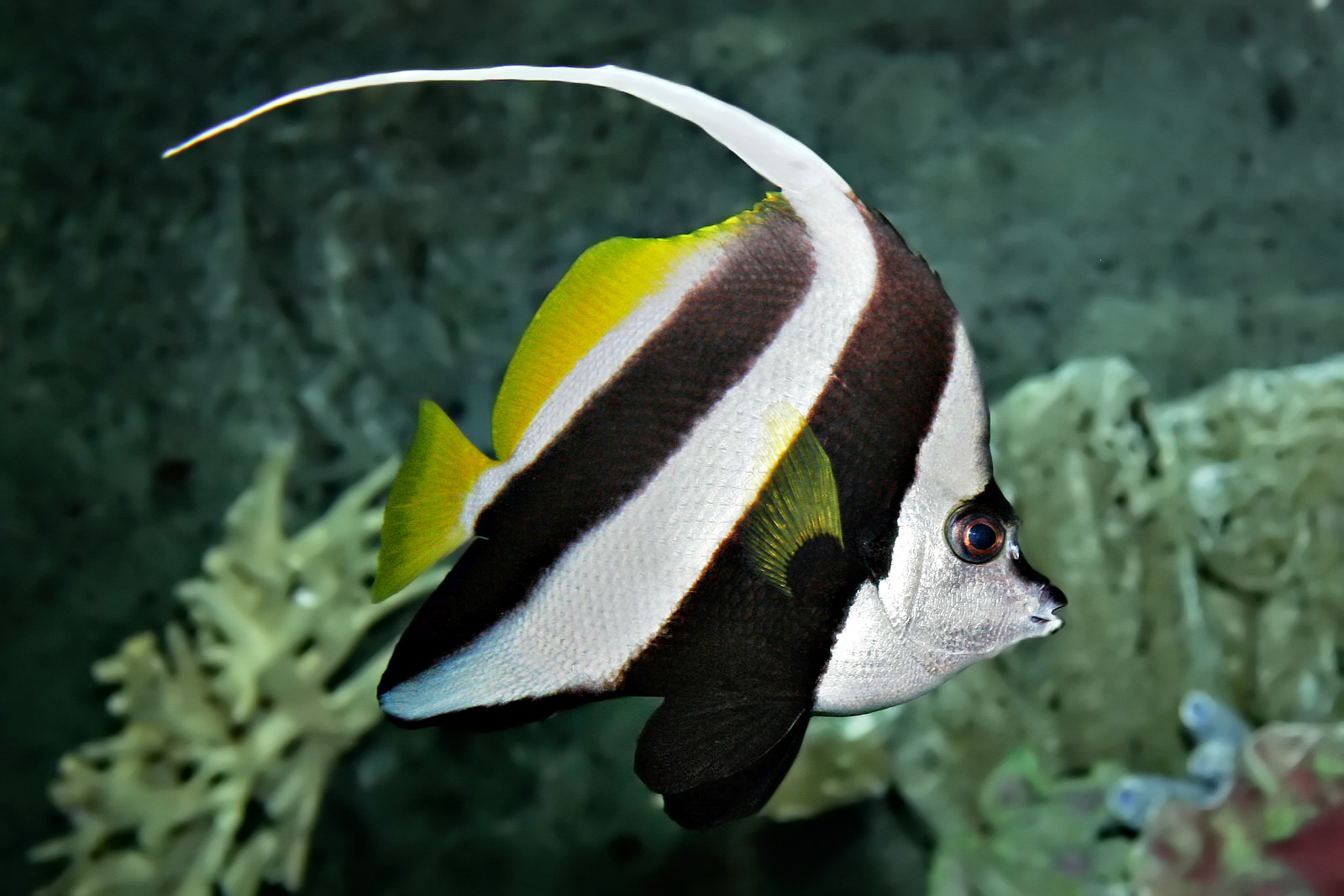
- Pennant coralfish (Heniochus acuminatus)

Scientific classification
- Kingdom: Animalia
- Phylum: Chordata
- Class: Actinopterygii
- Division: Teleostei
- Order: Acanthuriformes
- Family: Chaetodontidae
- Genus: Heniochus; G. Cuvier, 1816

Type species
- Chaetodon macrolepidotus Linnaeus, 1758

Synonyms
- Diphreutes Cantor, 1849; Taurichthys Cuvier 1829

= Heniochus =

Bannerfishes

Genus of fishes

Heniochus is a genus of marine ray-finned fish, butterflyfishes from the family Chaetodontidae. They are native to the Indo-Pacific. Though very similar in appearance to the Moorish idol (Zanclus cornutus), the members of this genus are not closely related to it.

== Characteristics ==
Heniochus species are distinguished within the Chaetodontidae by having the fourth spine in the dorsal fin elongated, or even forming a filament. The supraorbital crests in adults have spines or horn-like protuberances. They normally have a hump, or at least a robust bony growth on the nape.

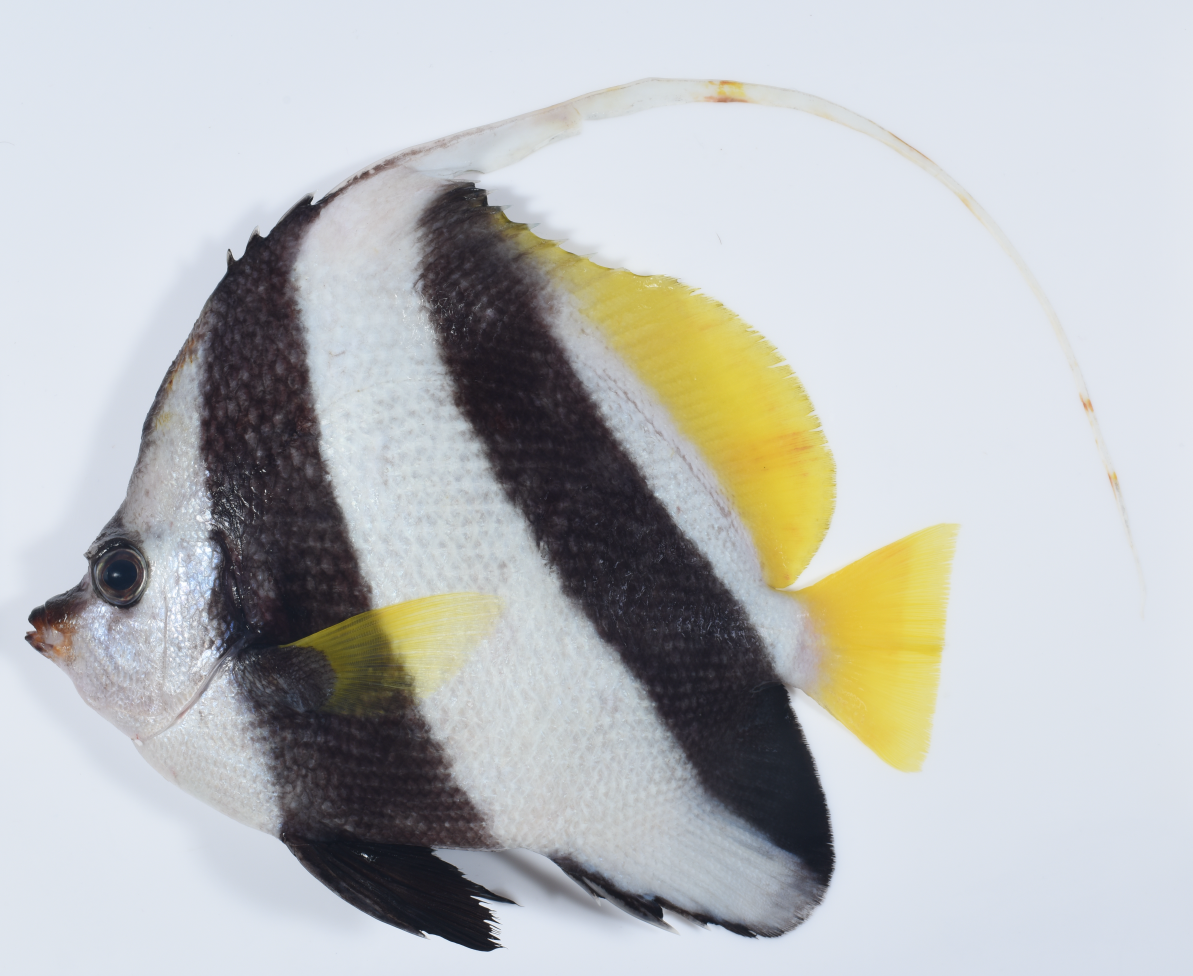
Heniochus acuminatus

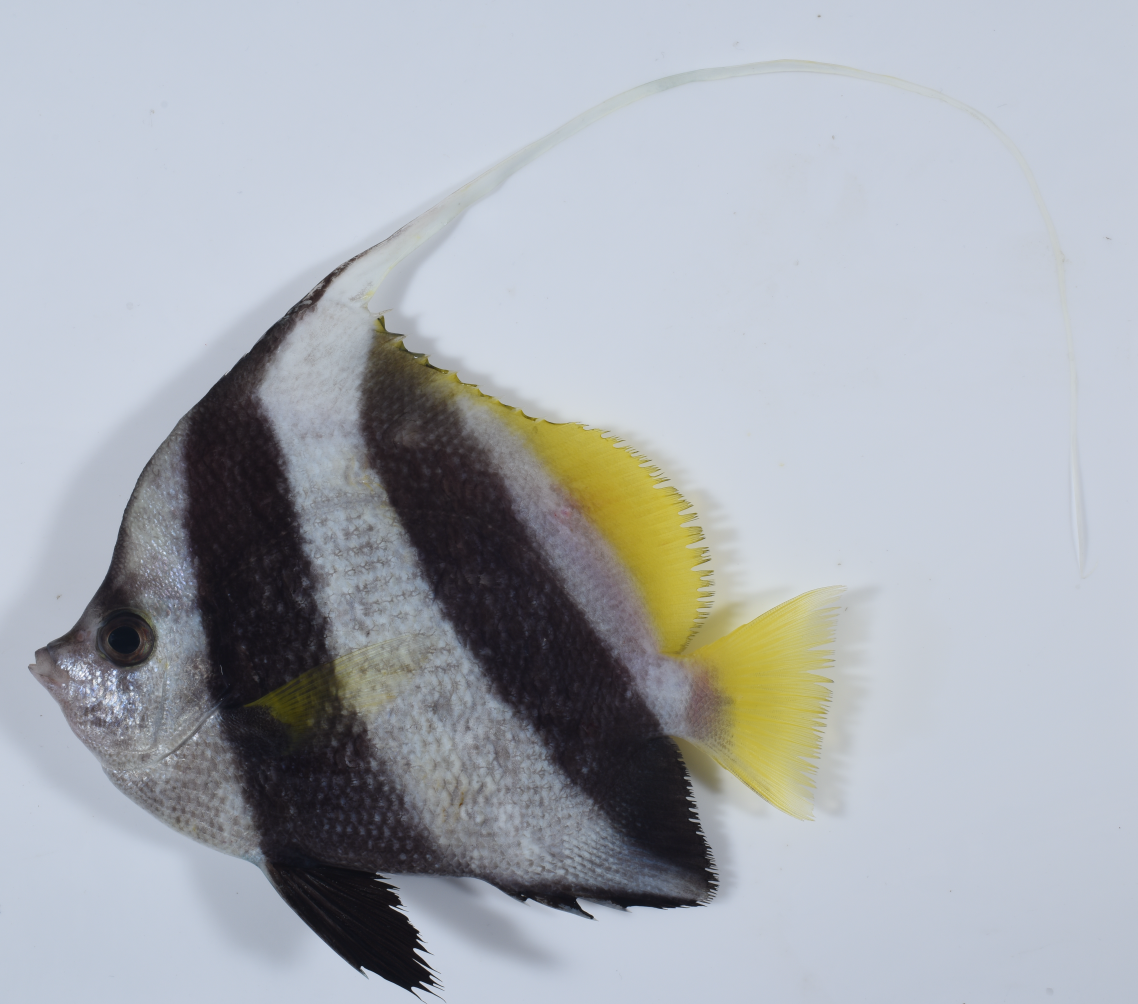
Heniochus diphreutes

Skeleton of Heniochus sp.

== Etymology ==
Heniochus is Greek for a “carriage driver” or “coachman” and is a reference to the long, filamentous 4th dorsal spine of these fish, resembling the whip of a coachman.

== Species ==
There are currently eight recognized species in this genus:

Species	Common name	Image
Heniochus acuminatus (Linnaeus, 1758)	Pennant coralfish	
Heniochus chrysostomus G. Cuvier, 1831	Threeband pennantfish	
Heniochus diphreutes D. S. Jordan, 1903	False moorish idol	
Heniochus intermedius Steindachner, 1893	Red Sea bannerfish	
Heniochus monoceros G. Cuvier, 1831	Masked bannerfish	
Heniochus pleurotaenia C. G. E. Ahl, 1923	Phantom bannerfish	
Heniochus singularius H. M. Smith & Radcliffe, 1911	Singular bannerfish	
Heniochus varius (G. Cuvier, 1829)	Horned bannerfish	
