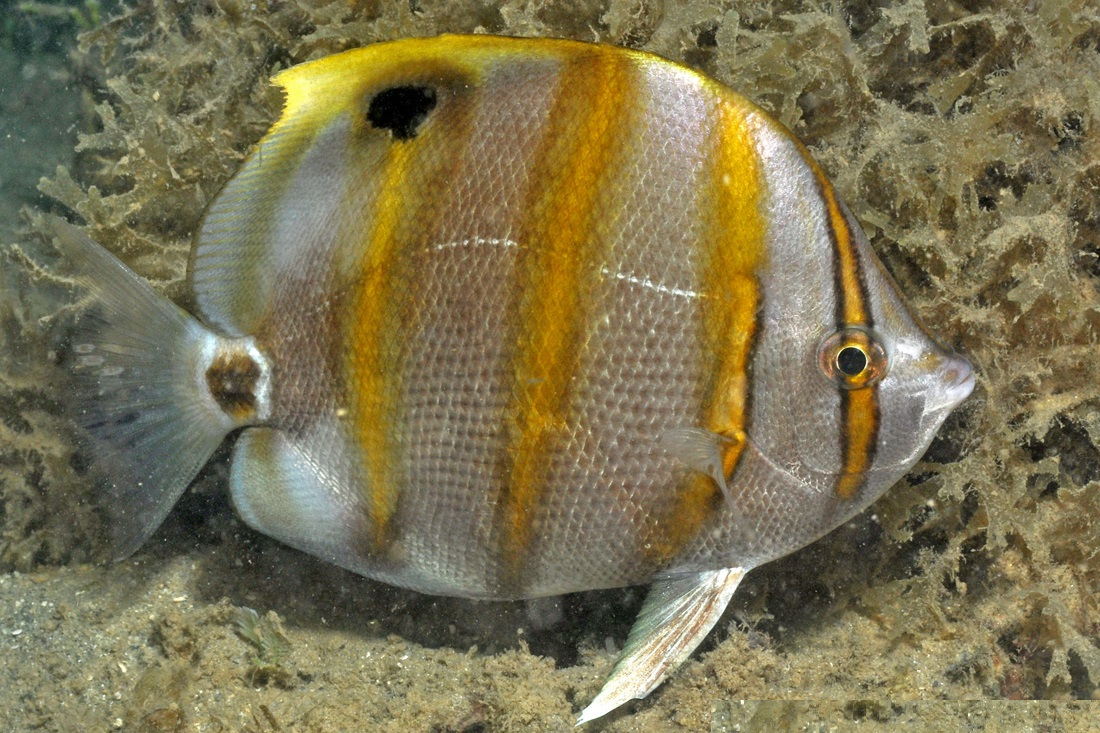

Conservation status
- Least Concern (IUCN 3.1)

Scientific classification
- Kingdom: Animalia
- Phylum: Chordata
- Class: Actinopterygii
- Order: Acanthuriformes
- Family: Chaetodontidae
- Genus: Parachaetodon; Bleeker, 1874
- Species: P. ocellatus

Binomial name
- Parachaetodon ocellatus (Cuvier, 1831)

Synonyms
- Platax ocellatus Cuvier, 1831; Chaetodon oligacanthus Bleeker, 1850; Chaetodon townleyi De Vis, 1884

= Parachaetodon =

Genus of fishes

Parachaetodon is a monotypic genus of butterflyfishes, the only species being the sixspine butterflyfish (Parachaetodon ocellatus), which is also known as the ocellate butterflyfish or eyespot butterflyfish. is a species of butterflyfish native to tropical reefs of the eastern Indian Ocean and the western Pacific Ocean.

== Description ==
Parachaetodon ocellatus has a largely yellow, triangular dorsal fin. The background colour of the body is white and there are five brow or orange bands. The first of these runs through the eye and is orange in colour edged with black. The band that starts underneath the centre of the dorsal fin has a dark blotch near the base of the fin. Another, oval shaped black mark with a silvery forward margin is located on the caudal peduncle. There is a fainter bar along the margins of the dorsal and anal fins. The dorsal fin contains 6-7 spines and 28-30 soft rays while the anal fin has 3 spines and 18-20 soft rays. This species attains a maximum total length of 18 centimetres (7.1 in).

== Distribution ==
Parachaetodon ocellatus has an Indo-Pacific distribution which extends from eastern India and Sri Lanka east through the south-east Asia, Indonesia and the Philippines and into the Pacific Ocean as far as the Fiji. It reach as far north as the Ryukyu Islands and Ogasawara Islands of Japan and south to Australia. in Australia it ranges from the Houtman Abrolhos in Western Australia, although juveniles have been recorded as far south as Perth, north around Australia's tropical coast then as far south as Sydney on the east coast.

== Habitat and biology ==
Parachaetodon ocellatus is found on coastal and inner reefs, typically as pairs or in small aggregations over open areas with a sand or silt substrate, These normally have scattered patches of sponge. Juveniles are occasionally recorded in seagrass in sheltered areas such as bays or lagoons. The diet consists of small benthic invertebrates and maybe some sponges. it is an oviparous species forming pairs for spawning.

== Systematics ==
Parachaetodon ocellatus was first formally described in 1831 as Platax ocellatus by the French anatomist Georges Cuvier (1768-1832). The Dutch ichthyologist Pieter Bleeker described a new species of butterflyfish, Chaetodon oligacanthus, from Java in 1850. In 1874 Bleeker placed C. ocellatus in the new genus Parachaetodon. This was considered by later workers to be closely related or synonymous with Cuvier's Platax ocellatus.
