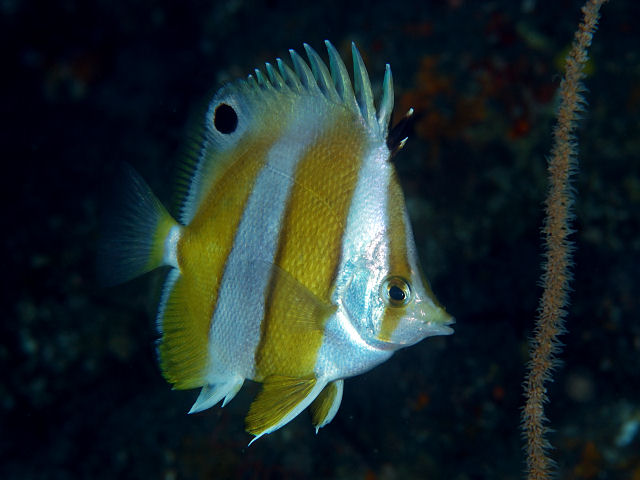
- Roa modesta

Scientific classification
- Kingdom: Animalia
- Phylum: Chordata
- Class: Actinopterygii
- Order: Acanthuriformes
- Family: Chaetodontidae
- Genus: Roa; D. S. Jordan, 1923

Type species
- Loa excelsa D. S. Jordan, 1921

= Roa (fish) =

Genus of fishes

Roa is a genus of butterflyfishes native to the Indian and Pacific oceans. The six species are widely distributed: R. australis near Australia, R. excelsa near Hawaii and nearby islands, R. jayakari near India, R. modesta near Japan and China, R. rumsfeldi in the Philippines, and R. haraguchiae near Japan and the Philippines.

== Species ==
There are currently eight recognized species in this genus:

- Roa australis Kuiter, 2004 (Triple-banded butterflyfish)
- Roa excelsa (D. S. Jordan, 1921) (Hawaiian gold-barred butterflyfish)
- Roa haraguchiae (Uejo, Senou & Motomura, 2020) (Haraguchi's butterflyfish)
- Roa jayakari (Norman, 1939) (Indian golden-barred butterflyfish)
- Roa modesta (Temminck & Schlegel, 1844) (Japanese golden-barred butterflyfish)
- Roa rumsfeldi (Rocha, Pinheiro, Wandell, Rocha & Shepherd, 2017) (Deep-blackfin butterflyfish)
- Roa semilunaris (Matsunuma & Motomura 2022) (Semilunar-spot butterflyfish)
- Roa uejoi (Matsunuma & Motomura 2022) (Uejo's butterflyfish)
