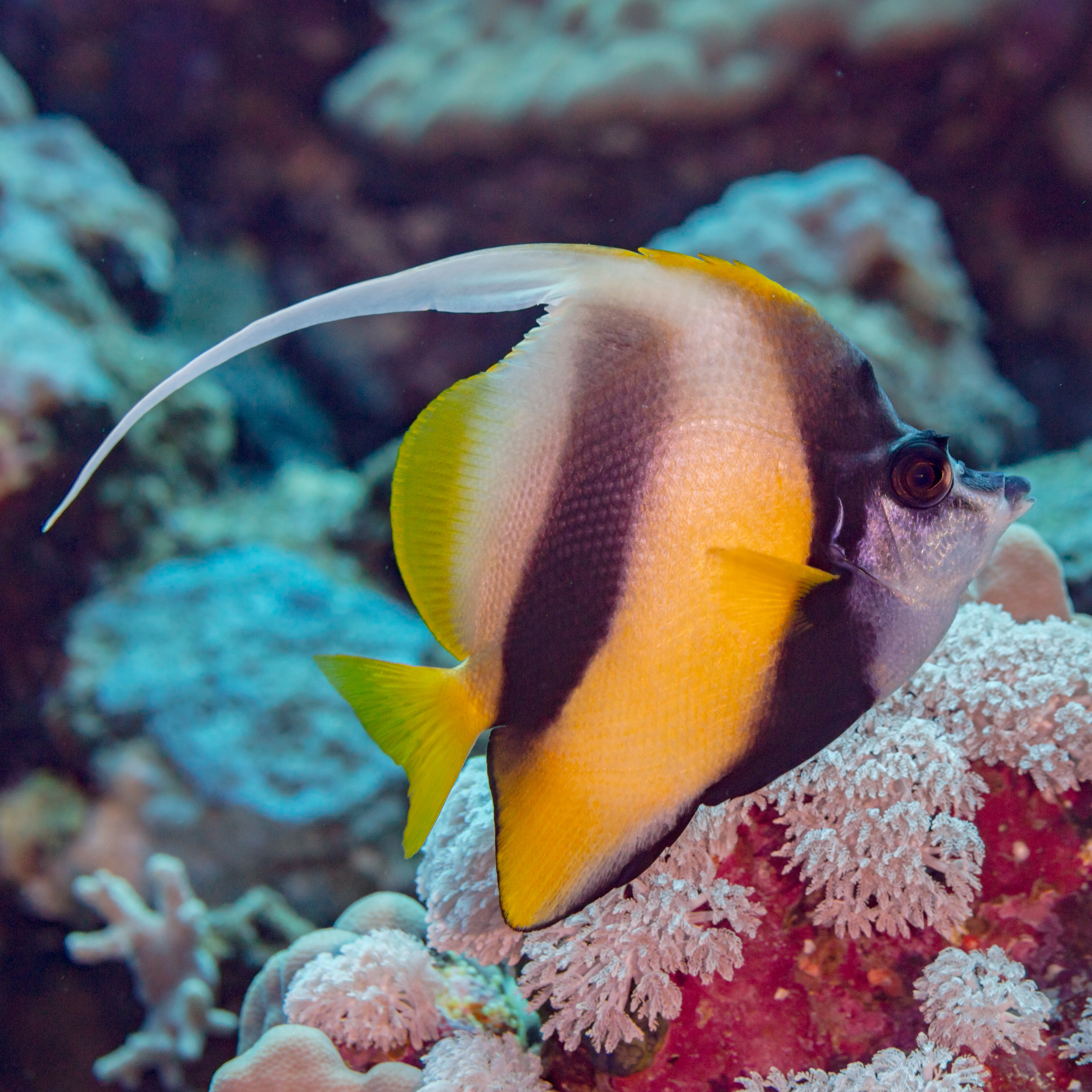

Conservation status
- Least Concern (IUCN 3.1)

Scientific classification
- Kingdom: Animalia
- Phylum: Chordata
- Class: Actinopterygii
- Division: Teleostei
- Order: Acanthuriformes
- Family: Chaetodontidae
- Genus: Heniochus
- Species: H. intermedius

Binomial name
- Heniochus intermedius Steindachner, 1893

= Red Sea bannerfish =

Species of fish

The Red Sea bannerfish (Heniochus intermedius) is a species of marine ray-finned fish, a butterflyfish from the family Chaetodontidae. It is found in the western Indian Ocean. It has been recorded as an introduced species off Florida and as a Lessepsian migrant in the eastern Mediterranean Sea off Turkey.

== Description ==
The Red Sea bannerfish has a deeply compressed body which is coloured pale yellow fading to white on the beck towards the head. There are 2 wide, angled oblique vertical blackish bands, these are darker below and become more diffuse towards the back. The forward band starts at the origin of the dorsal fin, adjacent to or over the eye and runs to the pelvic fin. The rear band starts at the spiny part of the dorsal fin and runs to rear part of the anal fin. The pectoral, the soft part of the dorsal and anal fins and the caudal fin are yellow, while the pelvic fins are black. It has a very elongated white filament extending from the anterior part of the dorsal fin dorsal filament which moves while the fish is swimming, resembling a banner being blown in the wind. The dorsal fin contains 11 spines and 25–26 soft rays while the anal fin has 3 spines and 17–18 soft rays. This species attains as maximum total length of 18 centimetres (7.1 in).

== Distribution ==
The Red Sea bannerfish is native to the western Indian Ocean where it is found in the Red Sea and the Gulf of Aden. It has been introduced to the waters off south eastern Florida, probably by means of escapes or releases from the aquarium or trade. Recently recorded in the Gulf of Antalya on the Mediterranean coast of Turkey following a likely introduction via the Suez Canal from the Red Sea, it remains very rare.

== Habitat and biology ==
The Red Sea bannerfish is associated with coral reefs where it is most frequently recorded as a solitary fish or in pairs, although large schools have been recorded. The juveniles form large schools, particularly in areas of deep reef where there is a low density of corals. They feed on both zooplankton and benthic invertebrates but the extent to which they feed on live coral has still to be determined. It is an oviparous species which forms monogamous pairs for spawning.

== Utilisation ==
The Red Sea bannerfish is collected for the aquarium trade but its collection is of a limited scale and is not believed to be a threat to the species population.

== Gallery ==
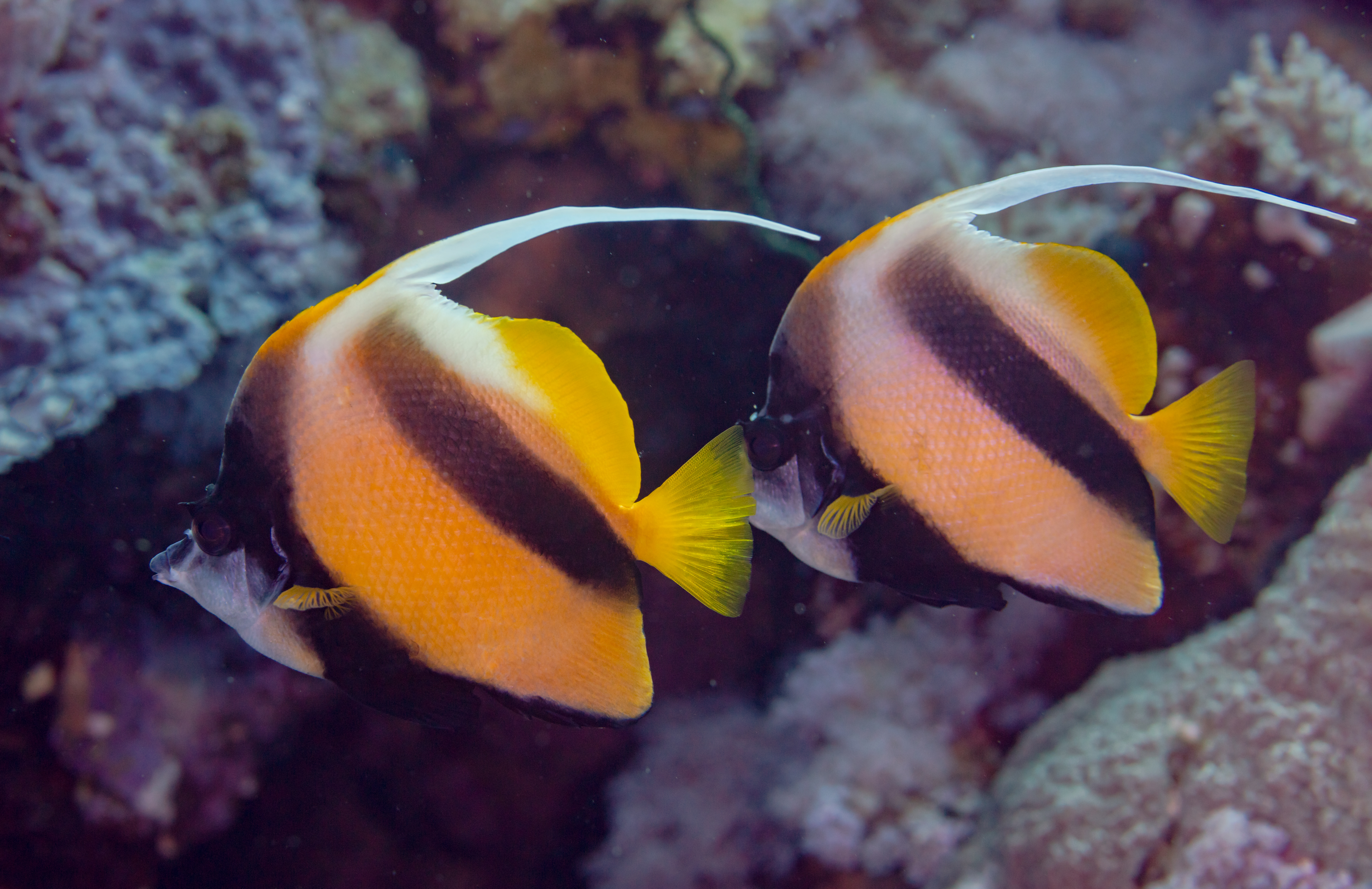

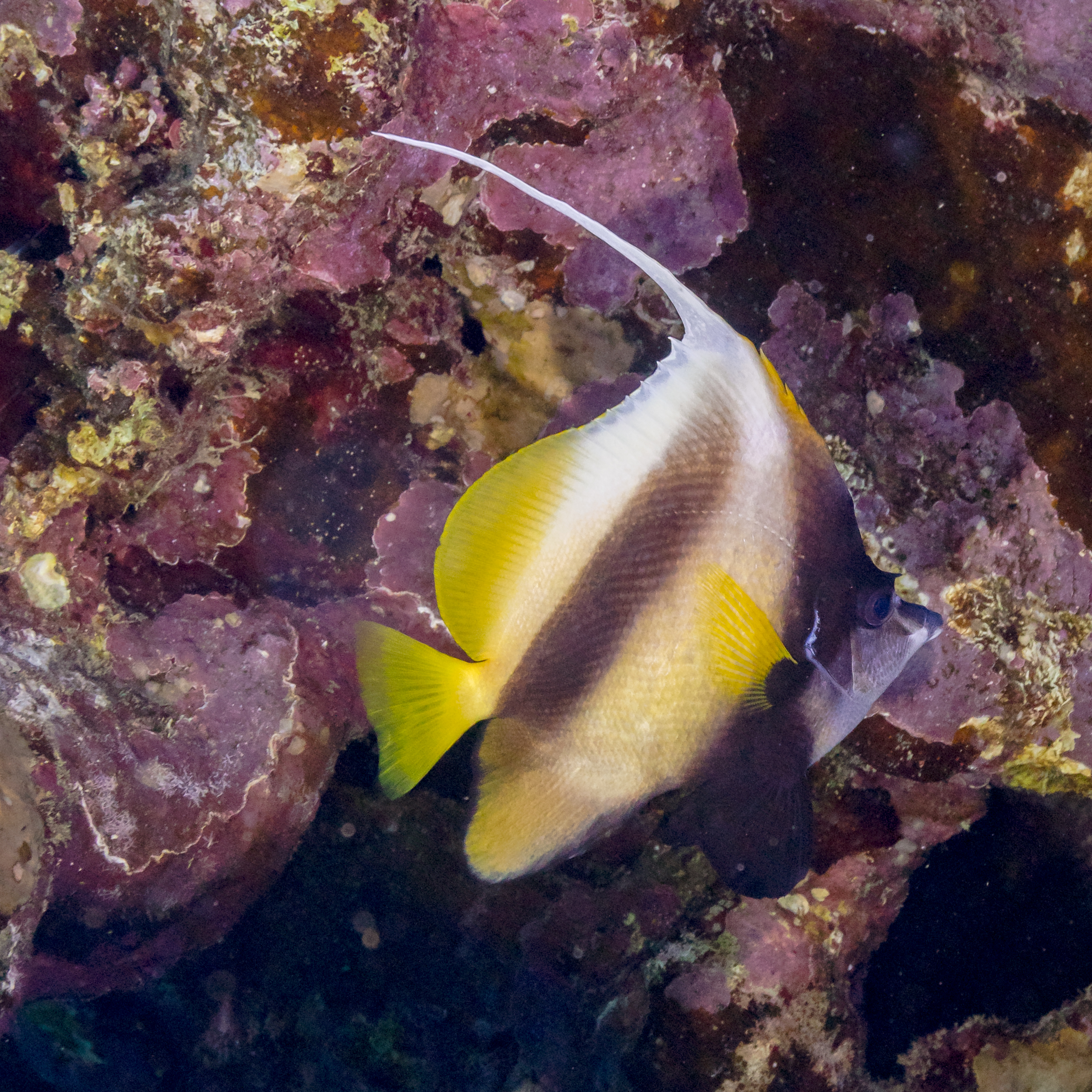

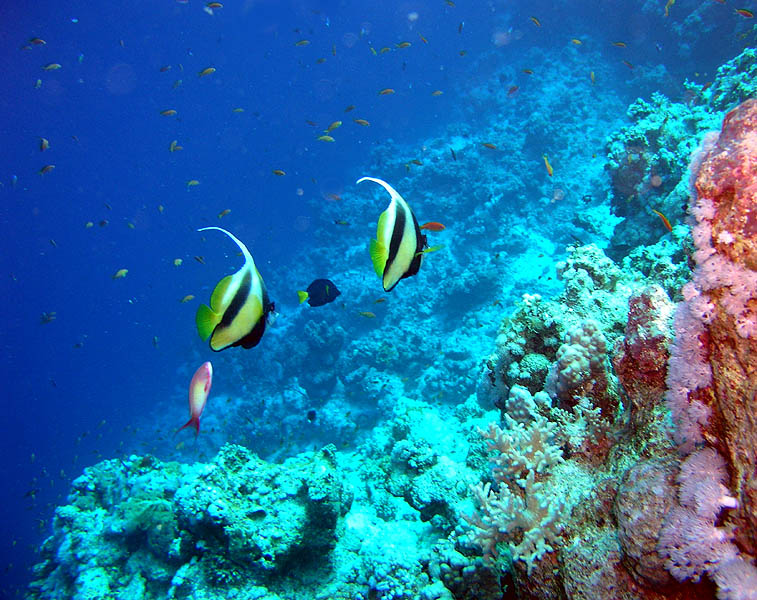

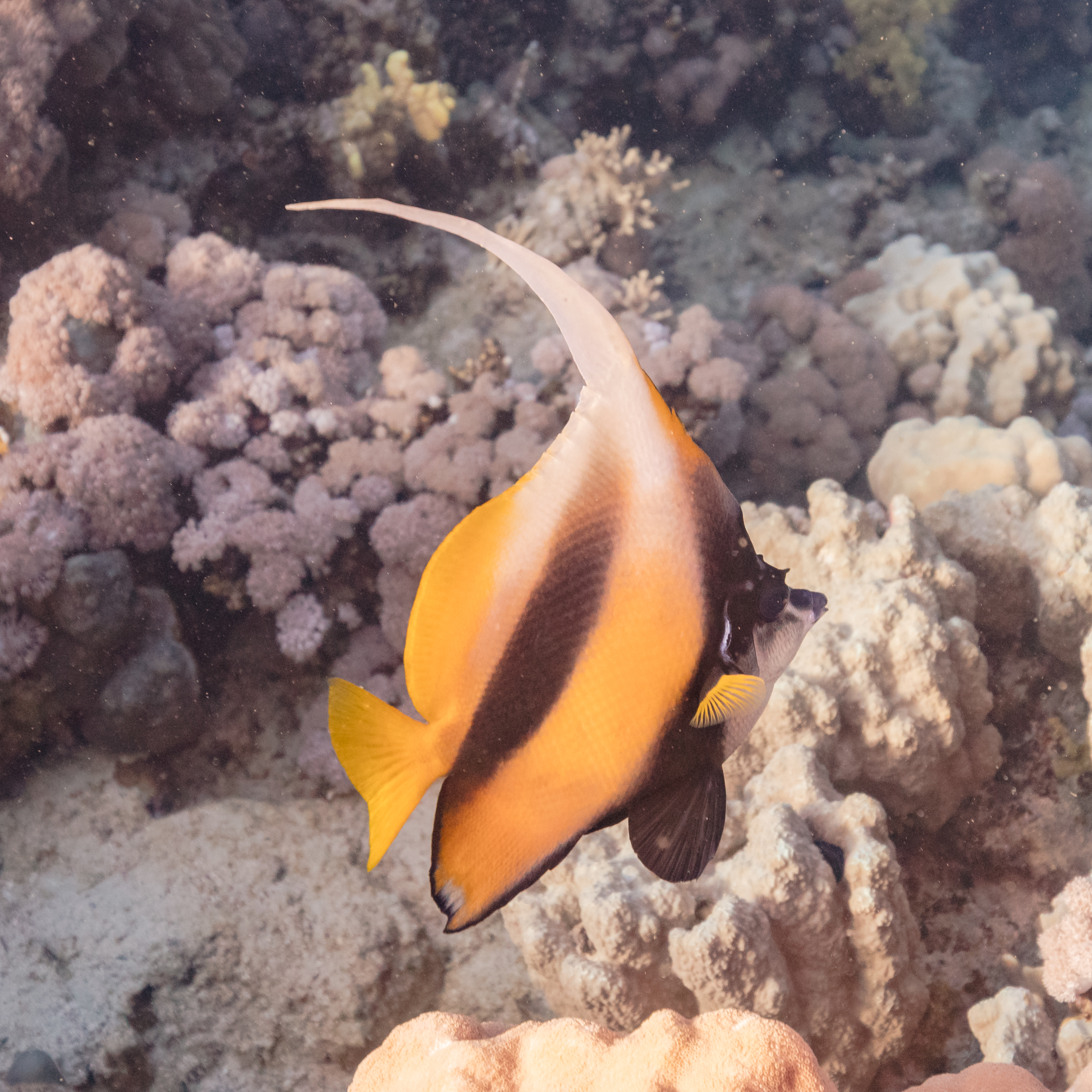
