= Edward Turner Bennett =

English zoologist

- Born: 6 January 1797; Hackney, Middlesex (now London)
- Died: 21 August 1836 (aged 39)
- Known for: New species of African crocodile, Mecistops leptorhynchus
- Relatives: John Joseph Bennett (brother)
- Scientific career
- Fields: Medicine, zoology
- Institutions: Zoological Society of London
- Author abbrev. (zoology): Bennett

Edward Turner Bennett (6 January 1797 – 21 August 1836) was an English zoologist and writer. He was the elder brother of the botanist John Joseph Bennett. Bennett was born at Hackney and practiced as a surgeon, but his chief pursuit was always zoology. In 1822, he attempted to establish an entomological society, which later became a zoological society in connection with the Linnean Society. This in turn became the starting point of the Zoological Society of London, of which Bennett was Secretary from 1831 to 1836. His works included The Tower Menagerie (1829) and The Gardens and Menagerie of the Zoological Society (1831). He also wrote, in conjunction with George Tradescant Lay, the section on Fishes in the Zoology of Beechey's Voyage (1839). In 1835, he described a new species of African crocodile, Mecistops leptorhynchus, the validity of which was confirmed in 2018.

== Taxon described by him ==
- See Category:Taxa named by Edward Turner Bennett

== Taxon named in his honor ==
- Chaetodon bennetti Cuvier 1831
- Hemitrygon bennettii (Müller & Henle 1841)
- Psettodes bennettii Steindachner 1870

Preceded by Nicholas Aylward Vigors	Secretary of the Zoological Society of London; 1833–1836	Succeeded by William Yarrell
