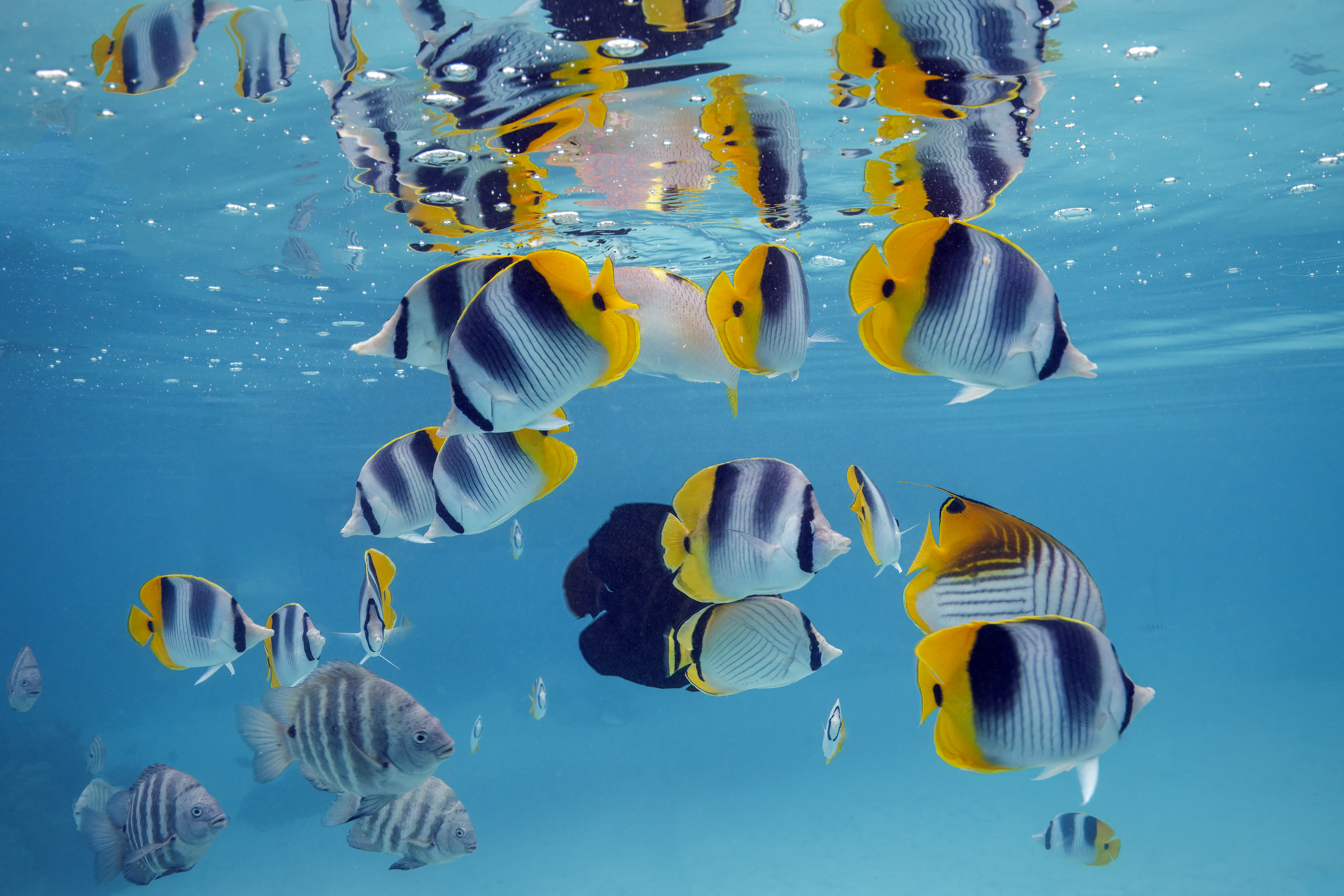
- Pacific double-saddle butterflyfish, vagabond butterflyfish, threadfin butterflyfish

Scientific classification
- Kingdom: Animalia
- Phylum: Chordata
- Class: Actinopterygii
- Order: Acanthuriformes
- Family: Chaetodontidae; Rafinesque, 1810

Genera
- About 10, see text

Synonyms
- Chaetodontinae (but see text)

= Butterflyfish =

Saltwater butterflyfishes Temporal range: Early Oligocene–present

Tropical marine fish of the family Chaetodontidae

The butterflyfish are a group of conspicuous tropical marine fish of the family Chaetodontidae; the bannerfish and coralfish are also included in this group. The approximately 129 species in 12 genera are found mostly on the reefs of the Atlantic, Indian, and Pacific Oceans. A number of species pairs occur in the Indian and Pacific Oceans, members of the huge genus Chaetodon.

Butterflyfish look like smaller versions of angelfish (Pomacanthidae), but unlike these, lack preopercle spines at the gill covers. Some members of the genus Heniochus resemble the Moorish idol (Zanclus cornutus) of the monotypic Zanclidae. All three families belong to the order Acanthuriformes and share a similar habitat.

== Description and ecology ==
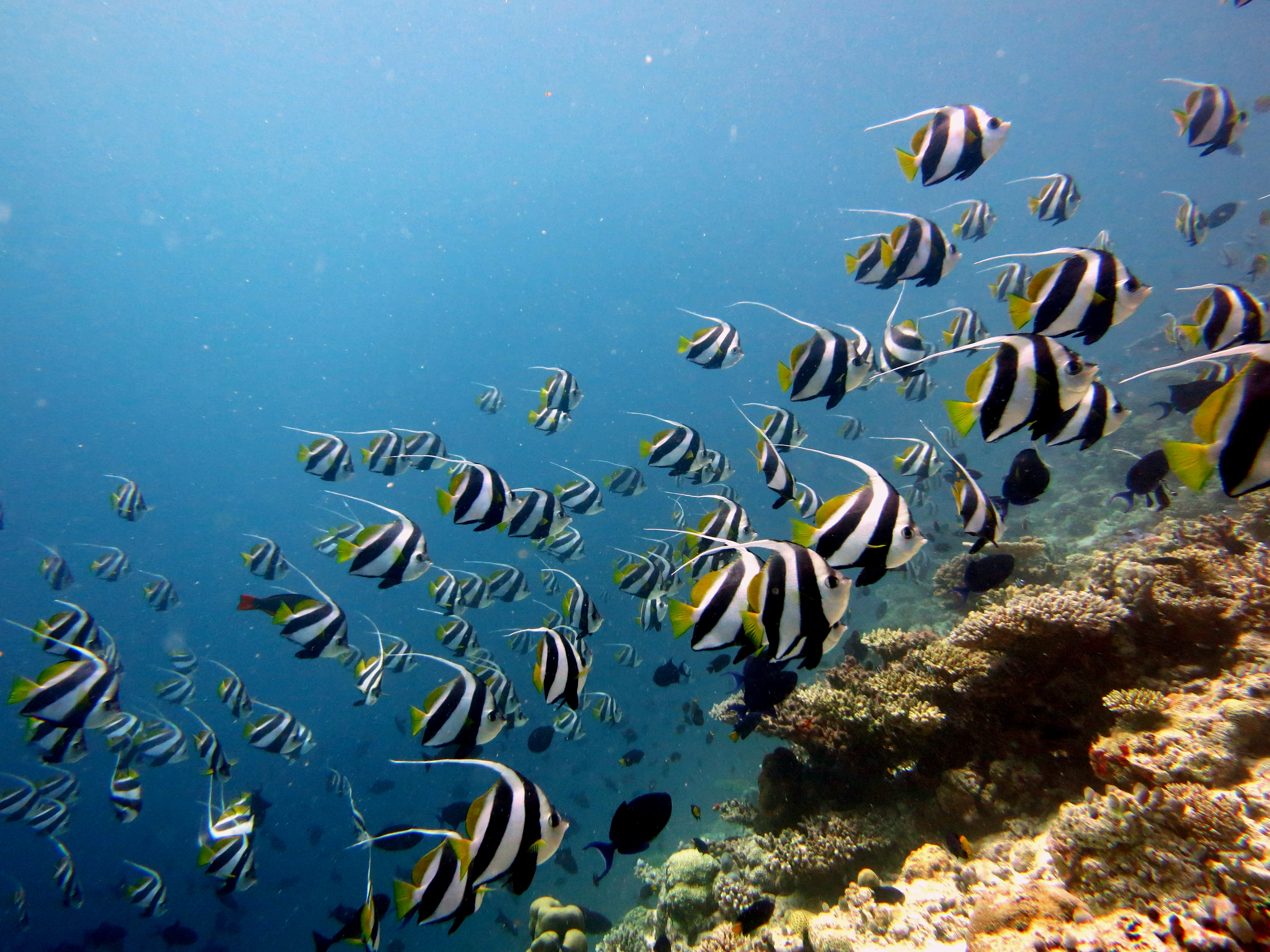
A school of false Moorish idols, Heniochus diphreutes

Butterflyfish mostly range from 12 to 22 cm (4.7 to 8.7 in) in length. The largest species, the lined butterflyfish and the saddle butterflyfish, C. ephippium, grow to 30 cm (12 in). The common name references the brightly coloured and strikingly patterned bodies of many species, bearing shades of black, white, blue, red, orange, and yellow. Other species are dull in colour. Butterflyfish are a boundless, different group of marine percoids with delegates on practically all coral reef frameworks and in every single tropical ocean. Their bright and color patterns have drawn in much consideration, creating an abundance of data about their conduct and environment. Many have eyespots on their flanks and dark bands across their eyes, not unlike the patterns seen on butterfly wings. Their deep, laterally narrow bodies are easily noticed through the profusion of reef life. The conspicuous coloration of butterflyfish may be intended for interspecies communication. Butterflyfish have uninterrupted dorsal fins with tail fins that may be rounded or truncated, but are never forked.

Generally diurnal and frequenting waters less than 18 m (59 ft) deep (though some species descend to 180 m (590 ft), butterflyfish stick to particular home ranges. These corallivores are especially territorial, forming pairs and staking claim to a specific coral head. Contrastingly, the zooplankton feeders form large conspecific groups. By night, butterflyfish hide in reef crevices and exhibit markedly different coloration.

Their coloration also makes them popular aquarium fish. However, most species feed on coral polyps and sea anemones. Balancing the relative populations of prey and predator is complex, leading hobby aquarists to focus on the few generalists and specialist zooplankton feeders.

Butterflyfish are pelagic spawners; that is, they release many buoyant eggs into the water, which become part of the plankton, floating with the currents until hatching. The fry go through a tholichthys stage, wherein the body of the postlarval fish is covered in large, bony plates extending from the head. They lose their bony plates as they mature. Only one other family of fish, the scats (Scatophagidae) express such an armored stage.

== Taxonomy, systematics and evolution ==
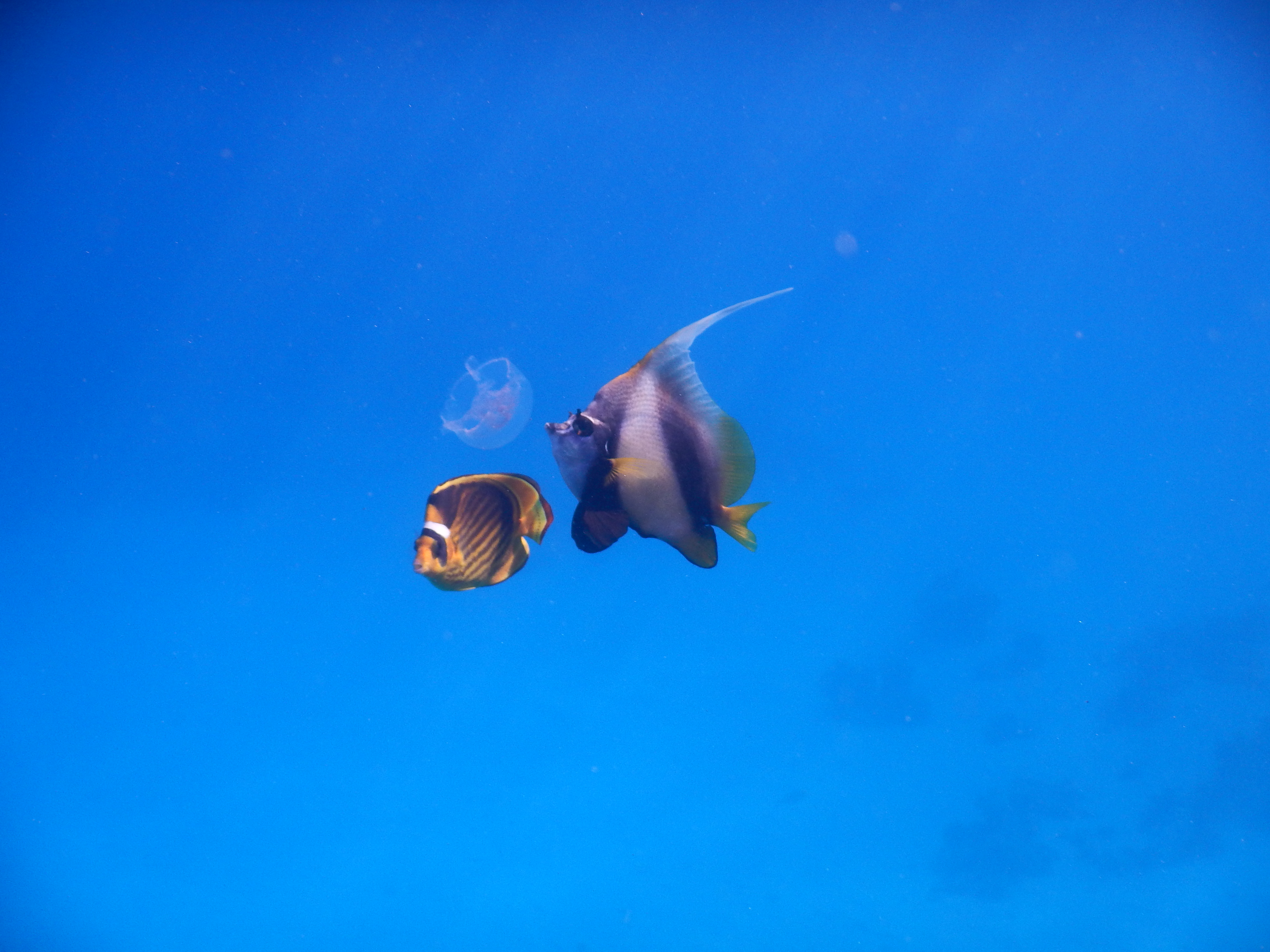
Red Sea raccoon butterflyfish (Chaetodon fasciatus) and Red Sea bannerfish (Heniochus intermedius) with a moon jelly

The Chaetodontidae can be, but are not usually, divided into two lineages that arguably are subfamilies. The subfamily name Chaetodontinae is a little-used leftover from the period when the Pomacanthidae and Chaetodontidae were united under the latter name as a single family. Hence, Chaetodontinae is today considered a junior synonym of Chaetodontidae. In any case, one lineage of Chaetodontidae (in the modern sense) contains the "typical" butterflyfish around Chaetodon, while the other unites the bannerfish and coralfish genera. As the Perciformes are highly paraphyletic, the precise relationships of the Chaetodontidae as a whole are badly resolved.

Chaetodontidae is classified within the suborder Percoidei by the 5th edition of Fishes of the World, but they are placed in an unnamed clade which sits outside the superfamily Percoidea. This clade contains 7 families which appear to have some relationship to Acanthuroidei, Monodactylidae, and Priacanthidae. Other authorities have paced the family in the order Chaetodontiformes alongside the family Leiognathidae. Presently, based on the most recent phylogenetic analyses, Eschmeyer's Catalog of Fishes places it in the large, diverse order Acanthuriformes. Molecular analyses suggest that the Chaetodontidae shared a common ancestor with the Scatophagidae and Pomacanthidae that lived during the Early Eocene (54 Ma).

Before DNA sequencing, the taxonomy was confused about whether to treat these as species or subspecies. Also, numerous subgenera have been proposed for splitting out of Chaetodon, and it is becoming clear how to subdivide the genus if that is desired.

=== Fossil record ===
The fossil record of this group is disputed and marginal. Their restriction to coral reefs means their carcasses are liable to be dispersed by scavengers, overgrown by corals, and any that do fossilize will not long survive erosion. Many Eocene-aged fish such as Pygaeus have been variously referred to Chaetodontidae in the past; if used for calibration, it can be deduced that most living genera were probably distinct by the end of the Paleogene 23 Mya. However, these Eocene genera cannot be reliably referred to Chaetodontidae.

The earliest confirmed fossil specimens of Chaetodontidae are an indeterminate larval specimen from Frauenweiler, Germany, two tholichthys specimens from the Menilite Formation of Poland, as well as the extinct species Chaetodon (Blumchaetodon) wattsi from Italy; all date to the Early Oligocene. The occurrence of the first confirmed butterflyfish in the Early Oligocene is supported by molecular phylogenies indicating that the family may have arose during the Late Eocene.

=== Genera ===
The family can be divided in two groups (the bannerfish-coralfish lineage and the butterflyfish lineage) considered distinct subfamilies by Eschmeyer's Catalog of Fishes:

- Family Chaetodontidae Rafinesque, 1815
  - Subfamily Heniochinae Kaup, 1860 (bannerfishes and coralfishes)
    - Amphichaetodon Burgess, 1978
    - Coradion Kaup, 1860
    - Chelmon Cloquet, 1817
    - Chelmonops Bleeker, 1876
    - Forcipiger Jordan & McGregor, 1898
    - Hemitaurichthys Bleeker, 1876
    - Heniochus Cuvier, 1816
    - Johnrandallia Nalbant, 1974
  - Subfamily Chaetodontinae Rafinesque, 1815
    - Chaetodon Linnaeus, 1758
    - Prognathodes Gill, 1862
  - Subfamily incertae sedis
    - Parachaetodon Bleeker, 1874
    - Roa Jordan, 1923

== Gallery ==
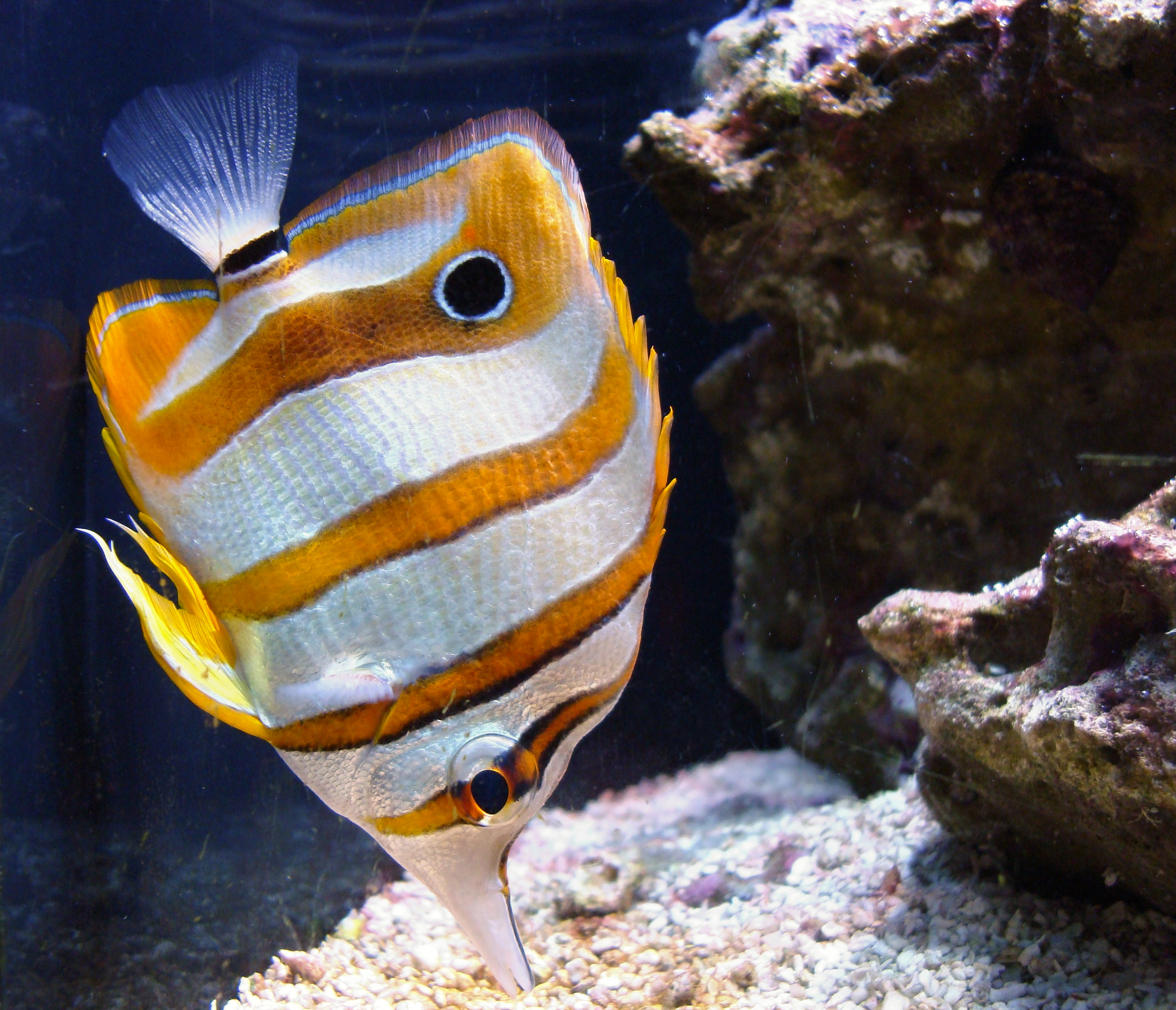
Copperband butterflyfish, Chelmon rostratus

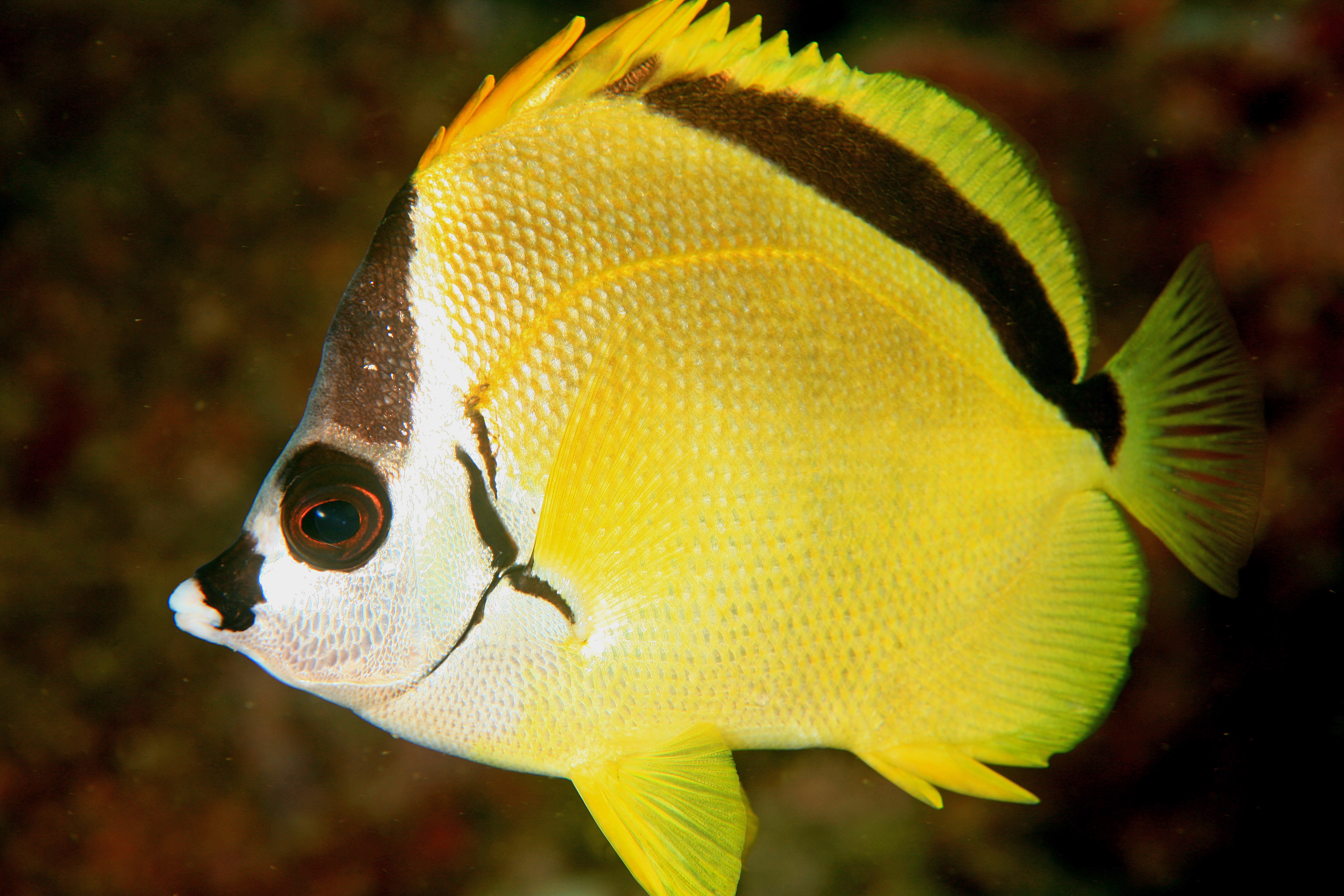
The enigmatic Johnrandallia nigrirostris

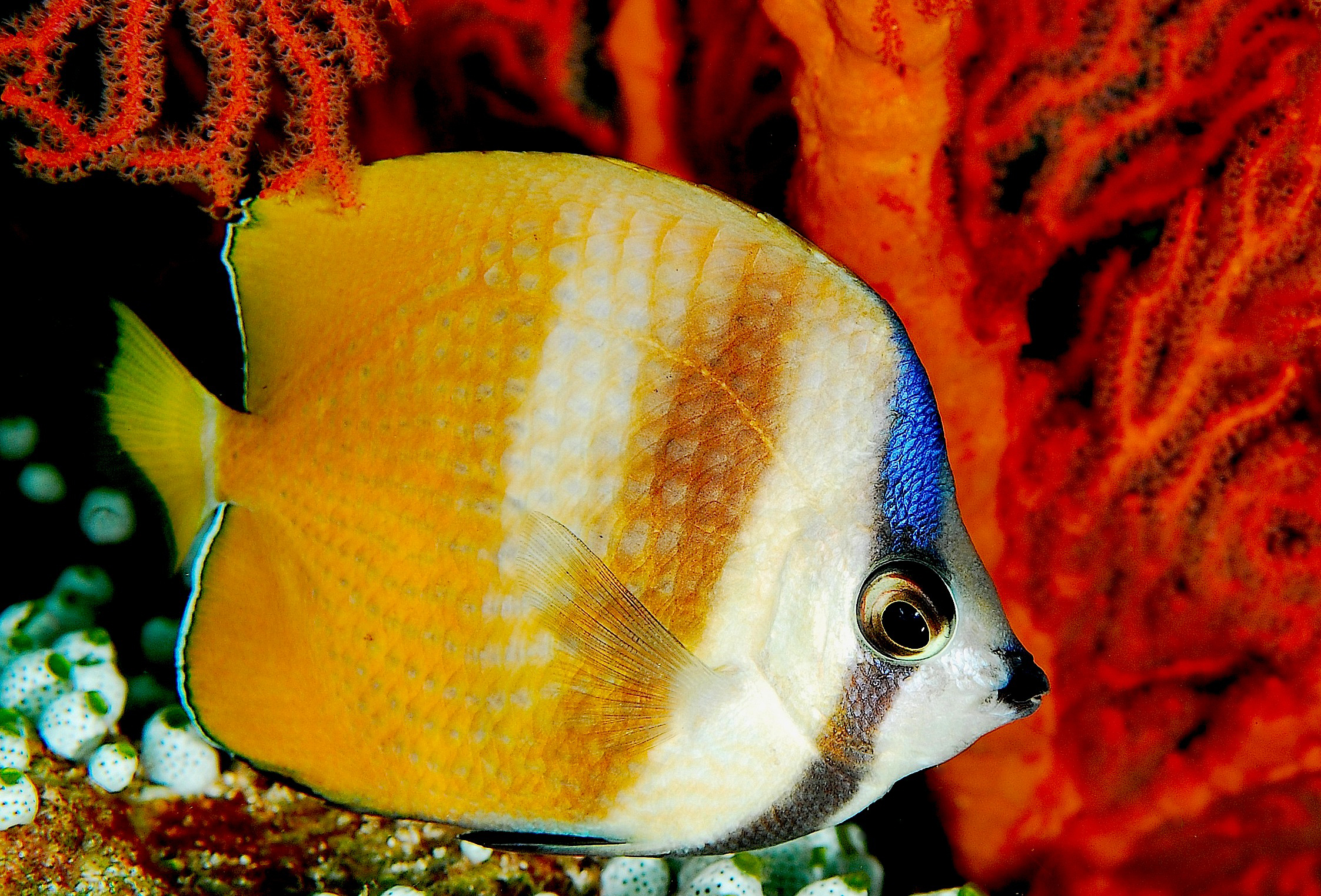
Sunburst butterflyfish, (sometimes placed in Lepidochaetodon)

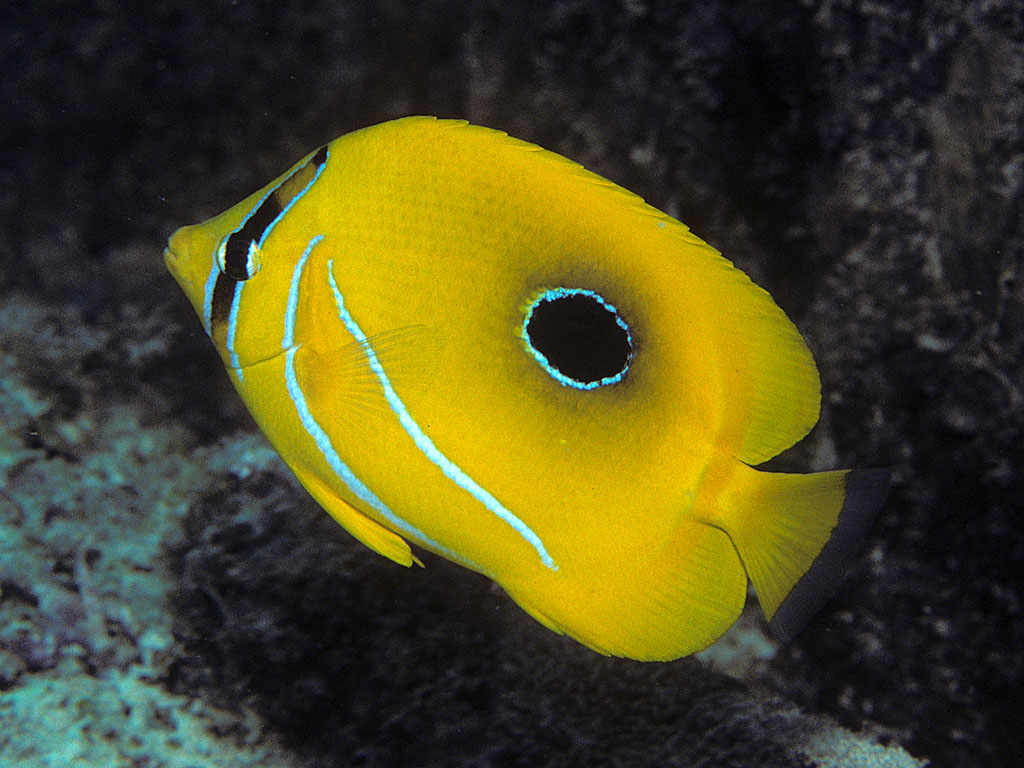
Bluelashed butterflyfish, Chaetodon bennetti (sometimes placed in Megaprotodon)
