= Longsnout butterflyfish =

Longsnout butterflyfish or longnose butterflyfish may refer to:

- Chelmon rostratus (Banded longsnout butterflyfish)
- Forcipiger flavissimus (Yellow longnose butterflyfish)
- Forcipiger longirostris (Longnose butterflyfish)
- Prognathodes aculeatus (Caribbean longsnout butterflyfish)
