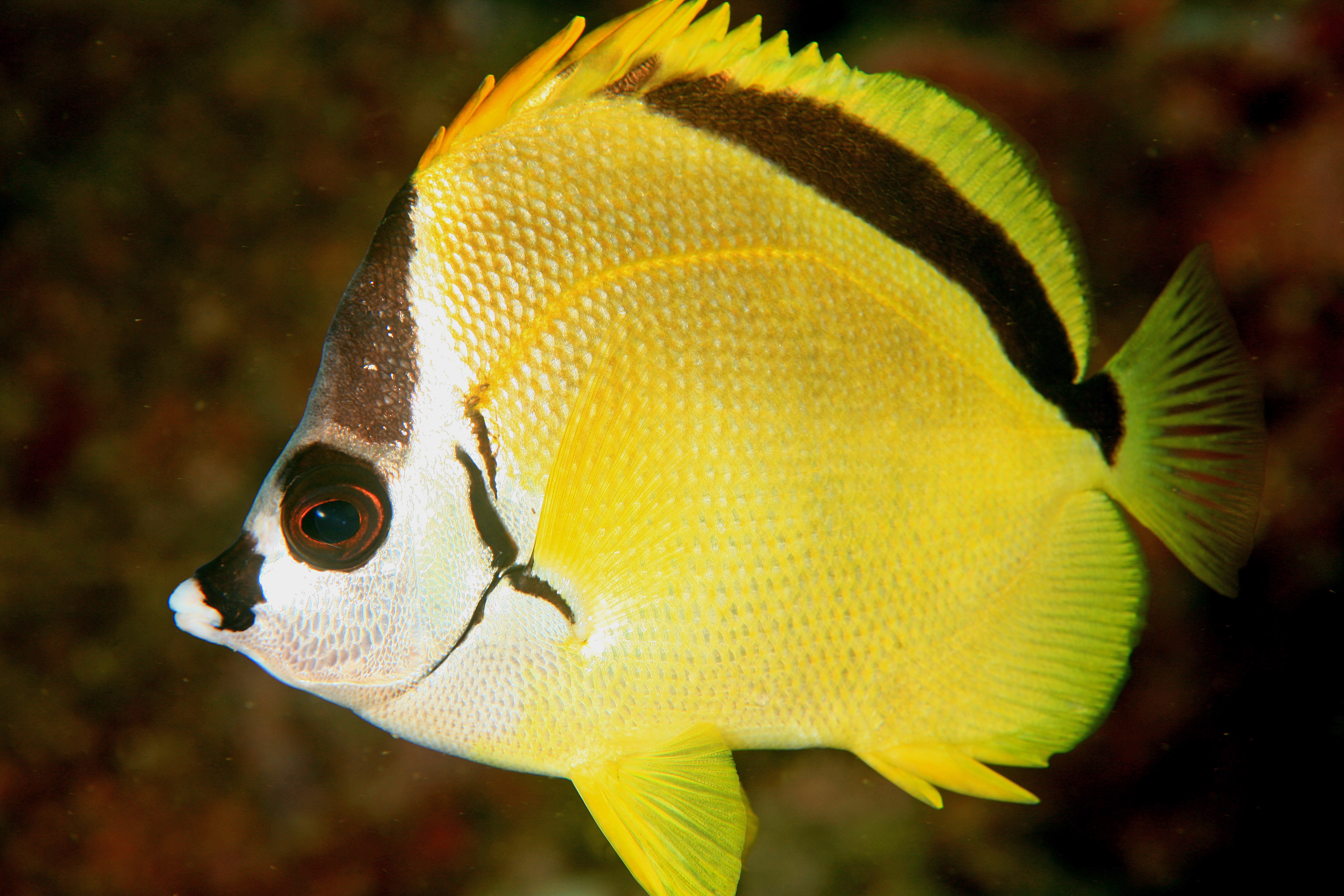

Conservation status
- Least Concern (IUCN 3.1)

Scientific classification
- Kingdom: Animalia
- Phylum: Chordata
- Class: Actinopterygii
- Division: Teleostei
- Order: Acanthuriformes
- Family: Chaetodontidae
- Genus: Johnrandallia; Nalbant, 1974
- Species: J. nigrirostris

Binomial name
- Johnrandallia nigrirostris (T. N. Gill, 1862)

Synonyms
- List: Chaethodon nigrirostris (Gill, 1862); Heniochus nigrirostris (Gill, 1862); Pseudochaetodon nigrirostris (Gill, 1862); Sarothrodus nigrirostri Gill, 1862; Johnrandalia nigrirostri Gill, 1862

= Johnrandallia =

Species of fish

The blacknosed butterflyfish or barberfish (Johnrandallia nigrirostris) (from the Spanish names, El Barbero or Mariposa Barbero, "the barber" or "butterfly barber"), is a species of fish in the family Chaetodontidae, the butterfly fishes. It is found in the East Pacific, specifically around the Galápagos Islands and in the Sea of Cortez, and it sometimes acts as a cleaner fish. It is the only member of the genus Johnrandallia, named after the ichthyologist John E. Randall, but in the past it was commonly placed in Chaetodon.

== Taxonomy ==
Johnrandallia nigrirostris was first formally described as Sarothrodus nigrirostris in 1862 by the American ichthyologist Theodore Nicholas Gill (1837–1914) with the type locality given as Cape San Lucas, Baja California. In 1974 the Romanian ichthyologist Teodor T. Nalbant (1933–2011) placed it in the monotypic genus Johnrandallia, named in honour of the American ichthyologist John E. Randall (1924-2020).

== Distribution ==
Johnrandallia nigrirostris is found in the Eastern Pacific from the Gulf of California to Panama, including the Cocos Island, Malpelo Island and the Galápagos Islands.

It has also been recorded in Peru.

== Description ==
In the Gulf of California

This species has a silvery-yellow, compressed body, and grows to 20.3 centimetres (8.0 in). It is marked with black bands along the base of its dorsal fin, and on its snout and forehead. It has a small protractile mouth with a black, burglar-like mask around its eyes. Johnrandallia nigrirostris has brush-like teeth.

It is superficially similar to Prognathodes carlhubbsi and P. falcifer, which also are native to the East Pacific.

== Habitat ==
This species lives at depths ranging from near the surface to 40 metres (130 ft). It inhabits coral reefs and rocky areas.

== Behaviour ==
Johnrandallia nigrirostris aggregates in small groups. It is highly active during the day, during which time it feeds. At night, it shelters near to the reef's surface. This species is a kind of cleaner fish. It will remain at cleaning stations where infested fishes come to have various crustaceans and other ectoparasites removed.

== Diet ==
This species feeds on crustaceans, molluscs, and algae.
