= Scythemarked butterflyfish =

Scythemarked butterflyfish can refer to two fish species:

- Prognathodes carlhubbsi, the southern scythemarked butterflyfish.
- Prognathodes falcifer, the northern scythemarked butterflyfish.
