= Lauwiliwilinukunukuʻoiʻoi =

The Hawaiian word lauwiliwilinukunukuʻoiʻoi refers to both of the following fish:

- Forcipiger flavissimus (Forcepsfish, a.k.a. Yellow Longnose Butterflyfish)
- Forcipiger longirostris (Longnose Butterflyfish)
