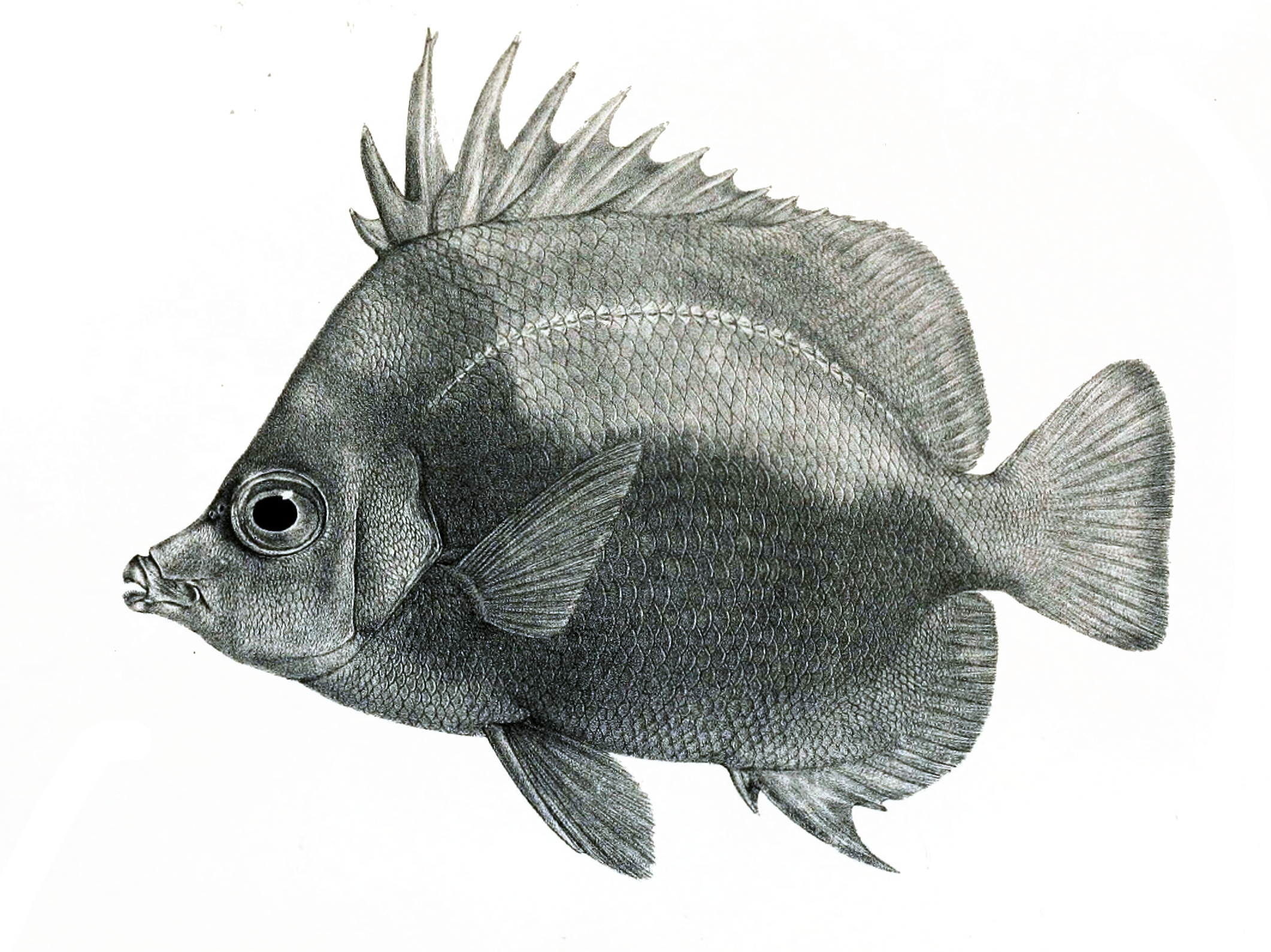

Conservation status
- Least Concern (IUCN 3.1)

Scientific classification
- Kingdom: Animalia
- Phylum: Chordata
- Class: Actinopterygii
- Order: Acanthuriformes
- Family: Chaetodontidae
- Genus: Prognathodes
- Species: P. dichrous

Binomial name
- Prognathodes dichrous (Günther, 1869)

Synonyms
- Chaetodon dichrous Günther, 1869

= Prognathodes dichrous =

Species of fish

Prognathodes dichrous, the bicolor butterflyfish, also known as the bastard cunningfish or hedgehog butterflyfish, is a species of marine ray-finned fish, a butterflyfish belonging to the family Chaetodontidae. It is found in the South Atlantic Ocean.

== Description ==
Prognathodes dichrous is largely brown in colour with the upper rear quarter of the body being white, including the dorsal and caudal fin The dorsal fin contains 12 spines and 19 soft rays while the anal fin has 3 spines and 15 soft rays. This species attains a maximum total length of 16 centimetres (6.3 in). There is a white eye ring, too.

== Distribution ==
Prognathodes dichrous is found in the southeastern Atlantic Ocean where it is endemic to the waters around the British Overseas Territories of Ascension and Saint Helena islands.

== Habitat and biology ==
Prognathodes dichrous is a species of deeper water, normally found between 12 and 35 metres (39 and 115 ft) but ar Hummock Point it can be seen in water as shallow as 1 metre (3.3 ft). It is found in caves and under overhangs, as well as on seamounts. It is normally encountered in pairs, although shoals have also been recorded, which browse on benthic invertebrates over rocky areas. This is an oviparous species which spawns as pairs.

== Systematics ==
Prognathodes dichrous was first formally described in 1869 by the German-born British zoologist Albert Günther (1830–1914) with the type locality given as St Helena. Its closest relative appears to be the rather similar Prognathodes obliquus which is endemic to St Paul Rocks off Brazil.
