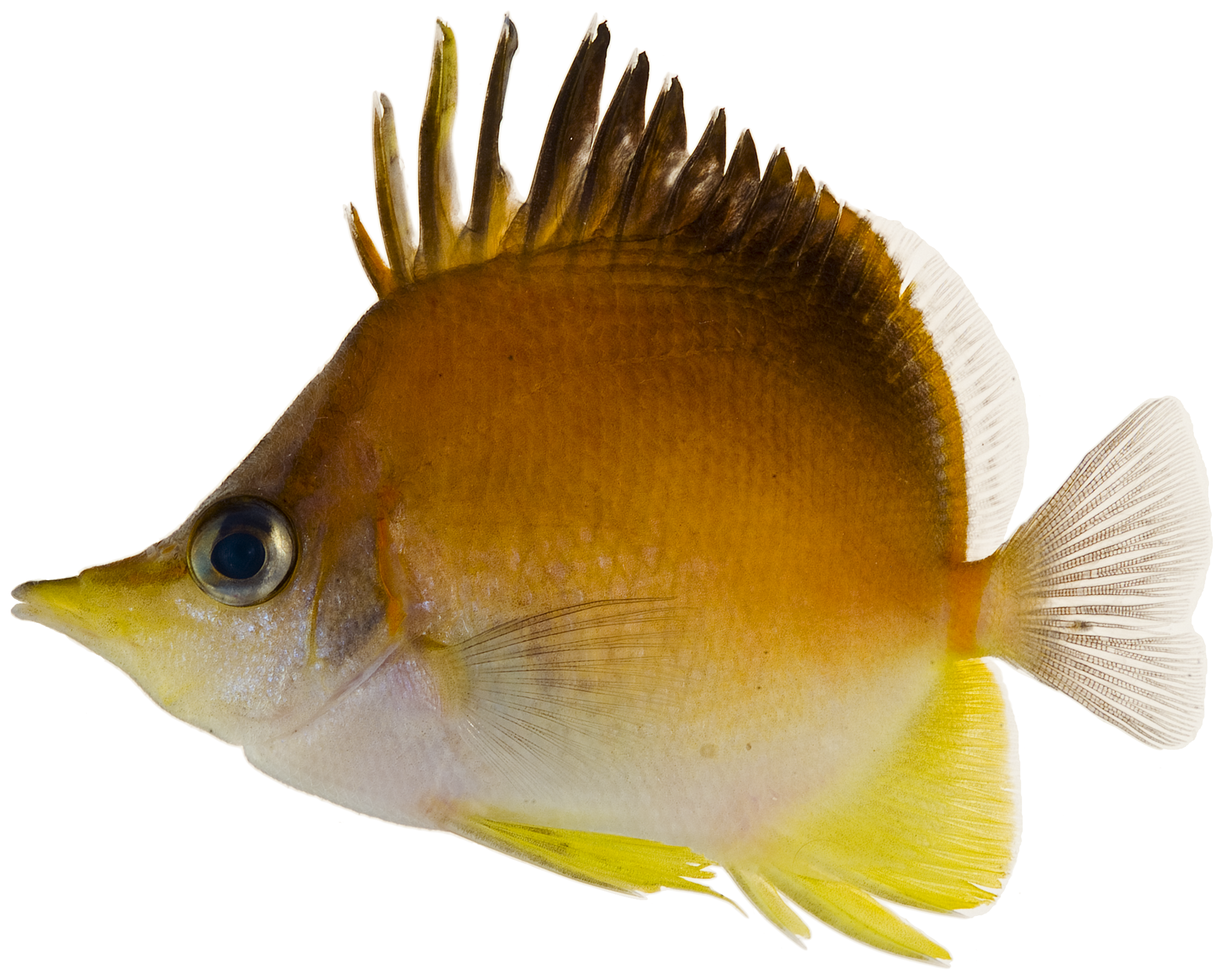
- Prognathodes aculeatus

Scientific classification
- Kingdom: Animalia
- Phylum: Chordata
- Class: Actinopterygii
- Order: Acanthuriformes
- Family: Chaetodontidae
- Genus: Prognathodes; T. N. Gill, 1862

Type species
- Prognathodes aculeatus (Poey, 1860)

= Prognathodes =

Genus of fishes

Prognathodes is a genus of butterflyfish in the family Chaetodontidae. They are found at rocky reefs in tropical oceans around the world and are mainly found deeper than Chaetodon; often a depths below those possible in normal scuba diving. In the past they were commonly included in the genus Chaetodon. They are whitish, yellow, black and dark brown, and reach 10–16 centimetres (3.9–6.3 in) in length.

== Species ==
There are currently 13 recognized species in this genus:

- Prognathodes aculeatus (Poey, 1860) (Longsnout butterflyfish)
- Prognathodes aya (D. S. Jordan, 1886) (Bank butterflyfish)
- Prognathodes basabei Pyle & Kosaki, 2016 (Orangemargin butterflyfish)
- Prognathodes brasiliensis W. E. Burgess, 2001 (Brazilian butterflyfish)
- Prognathodes carlhubbsi Nalbant, 1995 (Southern scythemarked butterflyfish)
- Prognathodes dichrous (Günther, 1869) (Bicolor butterflyfish)
- Prognathodes falcifer (C. L. Hubbs & Rechnitzer, 1958) (Northern scythemarked butterflyfish)
- Prognathodes geminus Copus, Pyle, Greene & Randall, 2019 (Twin butterflyfish)
- Prognathodes guezei (Maugé & Bauchot, 1976) (Gueze's butterflyfish)
- Prognathodes guyanensis (J. Durand, 1960) (French butterflyfish)
- Prognathodes guyotensis (Yamamoto & Tameka, 1982) (Guyote butterflyfish)
- Prognathodes marcellae (Poll, 1950) (Macaronesian butterflyfish)
- Prognathodes obliquus (Lubbock & A. J. Edwards, 1980) (Oblique butterflyfish)
