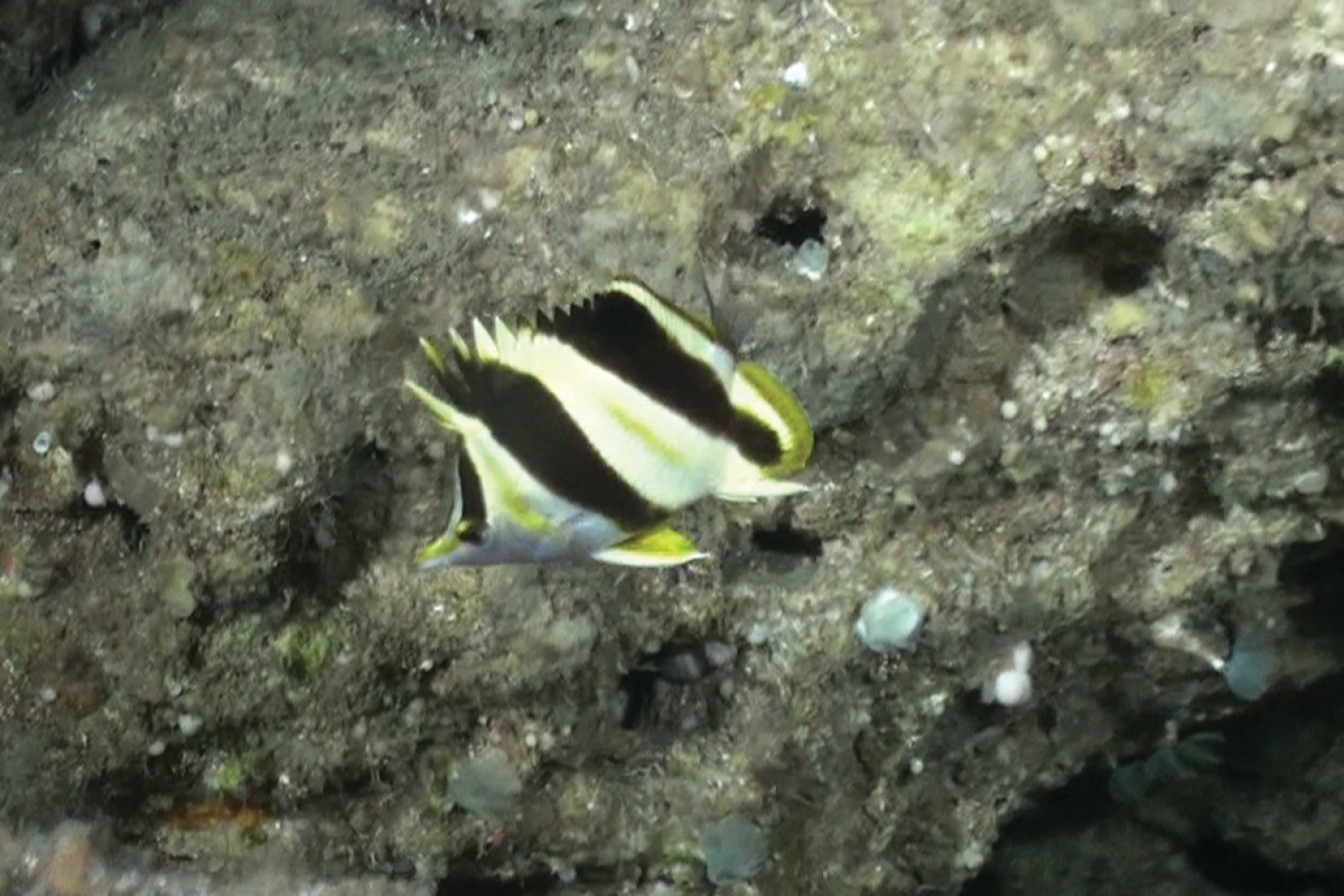

Conservation status
- Data Deficient (IUCN 3.1)

Scientific classification
- Kingdom: Animalia
- Phylum: Chordata
- Class: Actinopterygii
- Order: Acanthuriformes
- Family: Chaetodontidae
- Genus: Prognathodes
- Species: P. guezei

Binomial name
- Prognathodes guezei (Maugé & Bauchot, 1976)

Synonyms
- Chaetodon guezei Maugé & Bauchot, 1976

= Prognathodes guezei =

Species of fish

Prognathodes guezei, or Gueze's butterflyfish, is a species of butterflyfish, a marine ray-finned fish belonging to the family Chaetodontidae. It is found in the Western Indian Ocean, from Réunion Island, and Mauritius to the Comoros Islands.

== Description ==
Prognathodes guezei reaches a total length of 11.0 cm (4.3 in).

== Etymology ==
The fish is named in honor of marine biologist Paul Guézé, who collected the holotype specimen and helped collect even more paratype specimens.
