= Prognathodes brasiliensis =

Conservation status
- Least Concern (IUCN 3.1)

Scientific classification
- Kingdom: Animalia
- Phylum: Chordata
- Class: Actinopterygii
- Order: Acanthuriformes
- Family: Chaetodontidae
- Genus: Prognathodes
- Species: P. brasiliensis

Binomial name
- Prognathodes brasiliensis W. E. Burgess, 2001

Species of fish

Prognathodes brasiliensis, the Brazilian butterflyfish, is a species of butterflyfish, a marine ray-finned fish in the family Chaetodontidae. It is found in Brazil.
