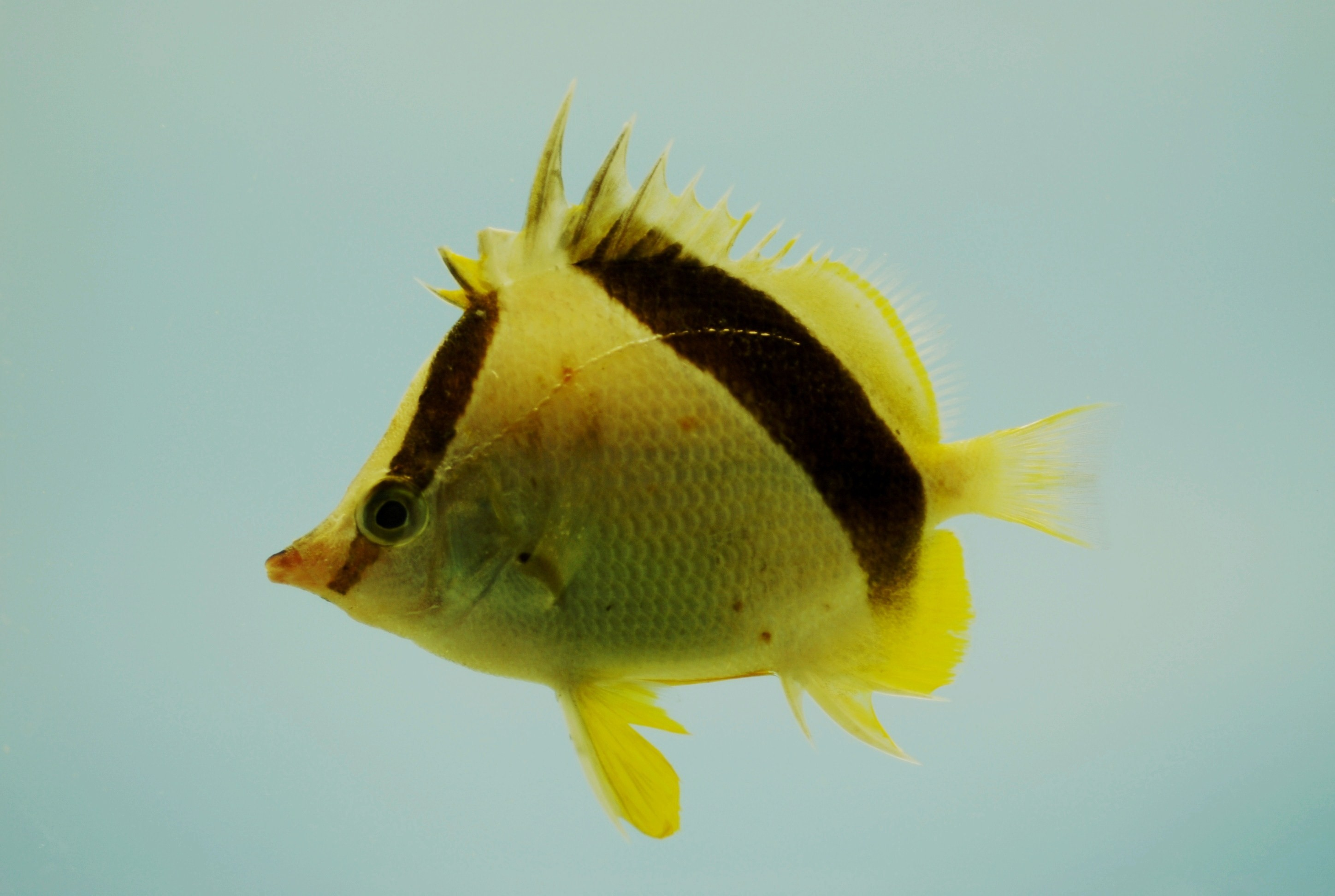

Conservation status
- Least Concern (IUCN 3.1)

Scientific classification
- Kingdom: Animalia
- Phylum: Chordata
- Class: Actinopterygii
- Order: Acanthuriformes
- Family: Chaetodontidae
- Genus: Prognathodes
- Species: P. aya

Binomial name
- Prognathodes aya (D. S. Jordan, 1886)

Synonyms
- Chaetodon aya D.S. Jordan, 1886; Chaetodon eques Steindachner, 1903

= Bank butterflyfish =

Species of fish

The Bank butterflyfish (Prognathodes aya) is a species of marine ray-finned fish. More specifically, it is a butterflyfish belonging to the family Chaetodontidae. The Bank butterflyfish is found in the tropical and sub-tropical waters of the western Atlantic Ocean.

== Description ==
The Bank butterflyfish is silvery white to tan in color, with yellow on all fins except the pectoral fins. It also has two sub-vertical dark, brownish, bars: the first lies across its eyes and follows the profile of the face and snout; the second begins at the back of the dorsal fin and extends downward near the tail but does not appear on the caudal fin. There is also a yellow band located behind the second dark bar that extends from the fifth spine of the dorsal fin, down to the back of the anal fin.

== Habitat and range ==
The Bank butterflyfish is uncommon throughout its range. It is found on natural and artificial reefs in Florida, the Gulf of Mexico, and off the Yucatán Peninsula. It is also found as far north as North Carolina, though it only rarely appears that far north.

== Relationship with humans ==
In regard to conservation, the Bank butterflyfish is not known to be threatened in any way and is listed as Least Concern by the IUCN. Though it is harvested for use in salt water aquaria, this commercial use does not appear to negatively impact the global population of the species. The Bank butterflyfish is also not protected by name in any specific legislation, though it is known to inhabit a number of protected areas.

When observed by scuba divers this fish is generally regarded as shy, and it is known to dart into the shelter of reefs upon approach. Once properly sheltered, however, some fish will remain at the entrance to whatever crevice they are using, apparently to watch divers.
