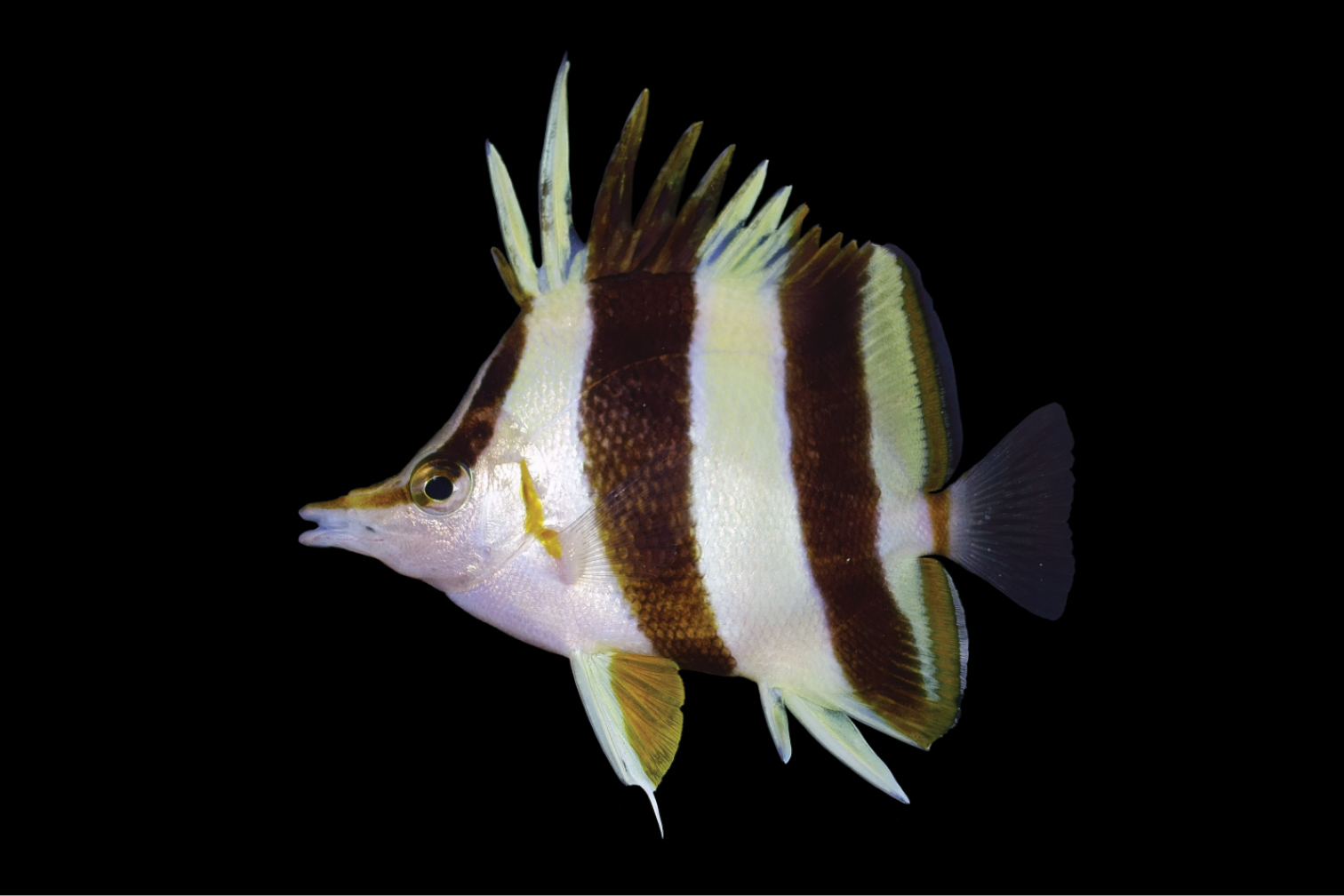

Scientific classification
- Kingdom: Animalia
- Phylum: Chordata
- Class: Actinopterygii
- Order: Acanthuriformes
- Family: Chaetodontidae
- Genus: Prognathodes
- Species: P. basabei

Binomial name
- Prognathodes basabei Pyle & Kosaki, 2016

= Prognathodes basabei =

Species of fish

Prognathodes basabei, the orange margin butterflyfish, is a species of butterflyfish, a marine ray-finned fish in the family Chaetodontidae. It is found in Hawaii.

== Description ==
Prognathodes basabei reaches a standard length of 10.6 cm (4.2 in).

== Etymology ==
Named in honor of Peter K. Basabe, a diver and aquarium fish collector, for his role in the collection of the first specimen of this new species in 1998.
