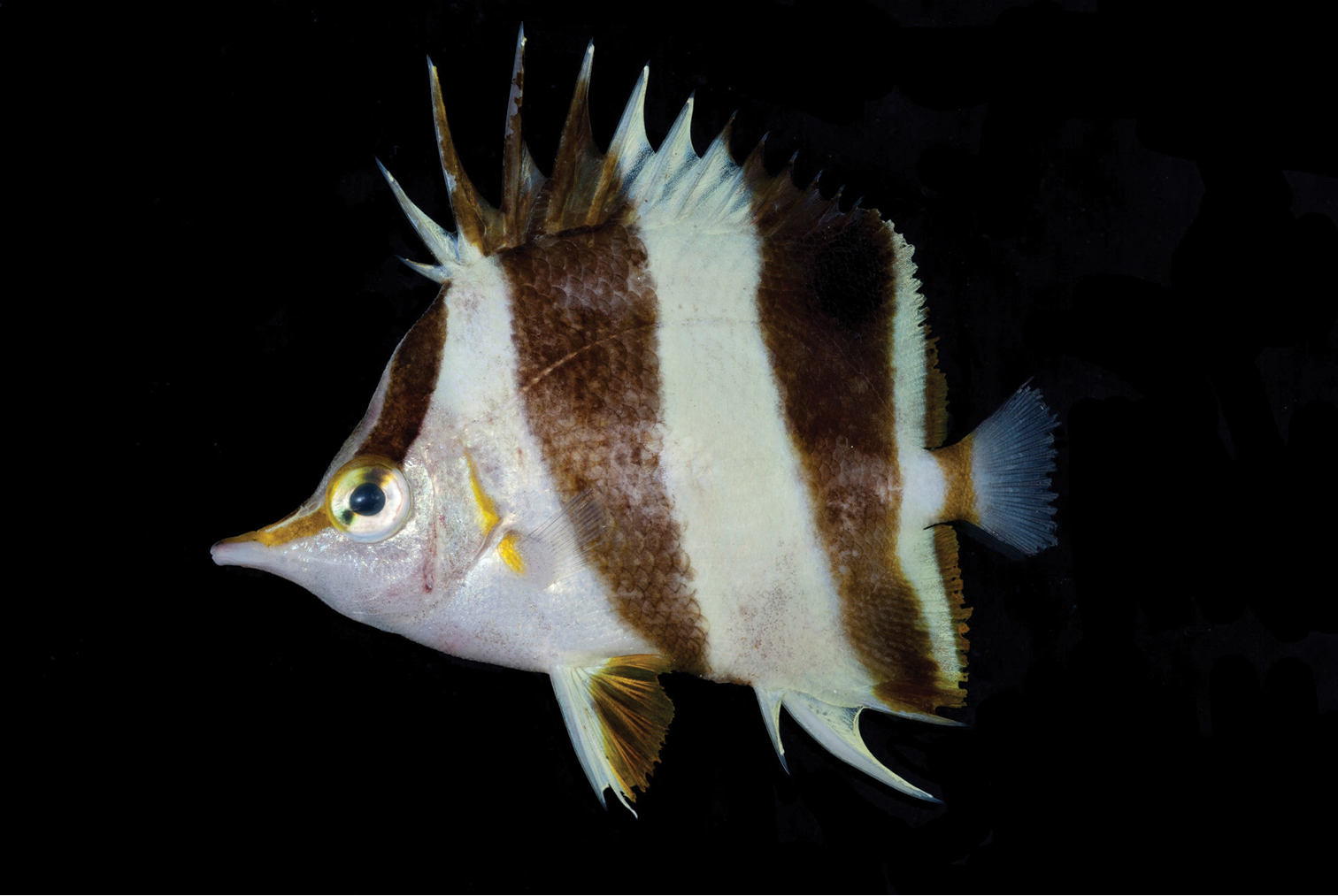

Scientific classification
- Kingdom: Animalia
- Phylum: Chordata
- Class: Actinopterygii
- Order: Acanthuriformes
- Family: Chaetodontidae
- Genus: Prognathodes
- Species: P. geminus

Binomial name
- Prognathodes geminus Copus, Pyle, Greene & Randall, 2019

= Prognathodes geminus =

Species of fish

Prognathodes geminus, the twin butterflyfish, is a species of butterflyfish, a marine ray-finned fish in the family Chaetodontidae. It is found in the western-central Pacific, around Caroline Island and Palau Island.

== Description ==
Prognathodes geminus reaches a standard length of 7.1 cm (2.8 in).
