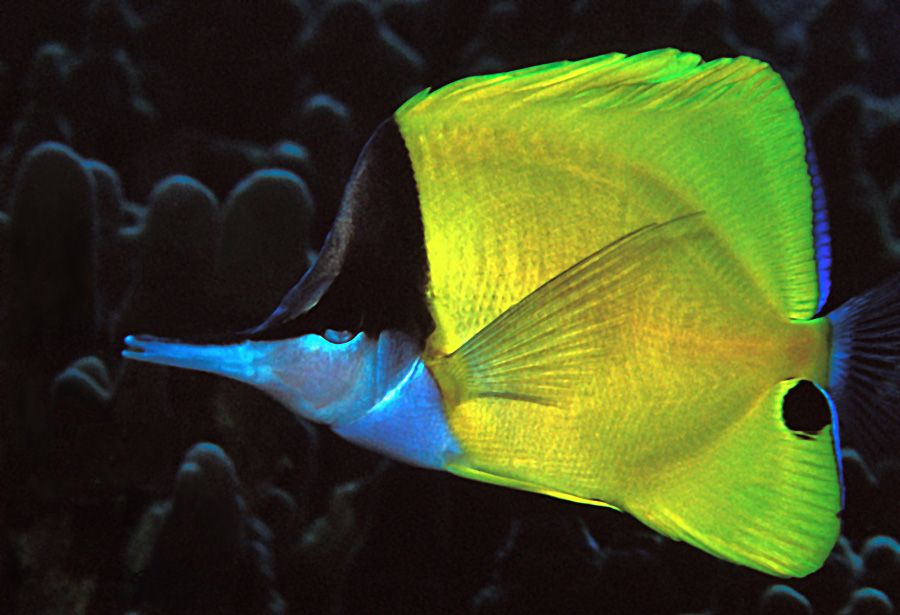
- Forcipiger flavissimus

Scientific classification
- Kingdom: Animalia
- Phylum: Chordata
- Class: Actinopterygii
- Order: Acanthuriformes
- Family: Chaetodontidae
- Genus: Forcipiger; D. S. Jordan & E. A. McGregor, 1898

Type species
- Chaetodon longirostris Broussonet, 1782

= Forcipiger =

Genus of tropical fish

Forcipiger is a genus of fish in the family Chaetodontidae, the butterflyfishes. It is distributed throughout the Indo-Pacific region. The name of this genus means “bearing forceps” and is a reference to the long, slender snouts of the species in this genus.

== Species ==
There are currently three recognized species in this genus:

Species	Common name	Image
Forcipiger flavissimus D. S. Jordan & E. A. McGregor, 1898	yellow longnose butterflyfish	
Forcipiger longirostris (Broussonet, 1782)	longnose butterflyfish	
Forcipiger wanai G. R. Allen, Erdmann & Sbrocco, 2012	Cenderawasih longnose butterflyfish	

Some authorities recognise a fourth species, F. cyrano, but this taxon is not treated as valid by Fishbase.
