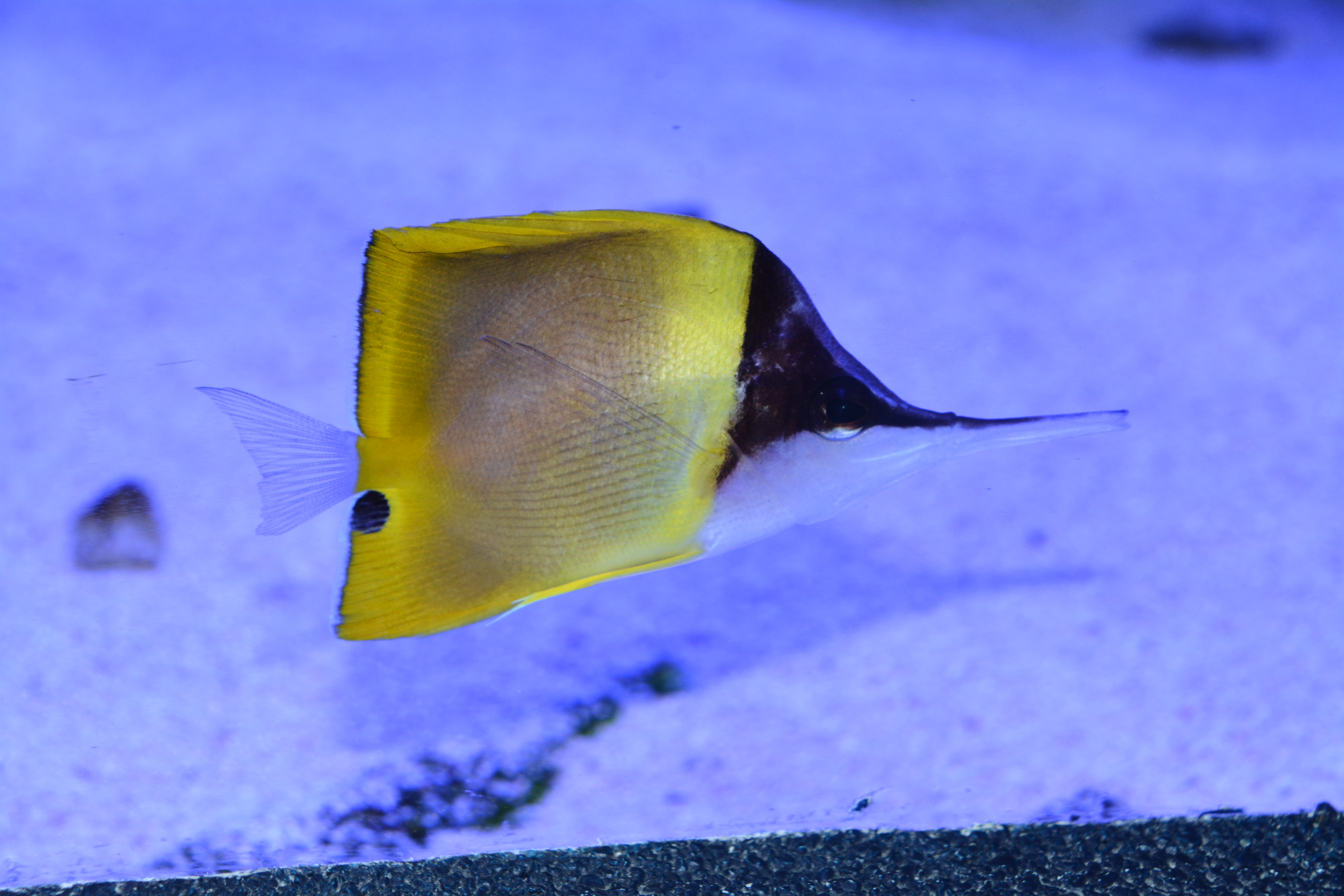

Scientific classification
- Kingdom: Animalia
- Phylum: Chordata
- Class: Actinopterygii
- Order: Acanthuriformes
- Family: Chaetodontidae
- Genus: Forcipiger
- Species: F. wanai

Binomial name
- Forcipiger wanai G. R. Allen, Erdmann & Jones Sbrocco, 2012

= Forcipiger wanai =

Species of fish

Forcipiger wanai, the Cenderawasih longnose butterflyfish, is a species of marine ray-finned fish, a butterflyfish from the family Chaetodontidae. It is endemic to Cenderawasih Bay in the Bird's Head Peninsula region of West Papua.

== Etymology ==
The name for this fish is used by the local inhabitants, who speak the Wandammen language group in the southwestern part of Cenderawasih Bay, West Papua Province, Indonesia, which is the type locality.
