= Prognathodes obliquus =

Conservation status
- Data Deficient (IUCN 3.1)

Scientific classification
- Kingdom: Animalia
- Phylum: Chordata
- Class: Actinopterygii
- Order: Acanthuriformes
- Family: Chaetodontidae
- Genus: Prognathodes
- Species: P. obliquus

Binomial name
- Prognathodes obliquus (Lubbock & A. J. Edwards, 1980)

Synonyms
- Chaetodon obliquus Lubbock & A.J. Edwards, 1980

Species of fish

Prognathodes obliquus, the oblique butterflyfish is a species of marine ray-finned fish, a butterflyfish belonging to the family Chaetodontidae. It is endemic to St Paul Rocks in the southwestern Atlantic Ocean off Brazil.

Destruction of its habitat by pollution, marine construction and pollution has rendered it vulnerable to extinction.
