= Andreas Rechnitzer =

American oceanographer and scuba diving pioneer

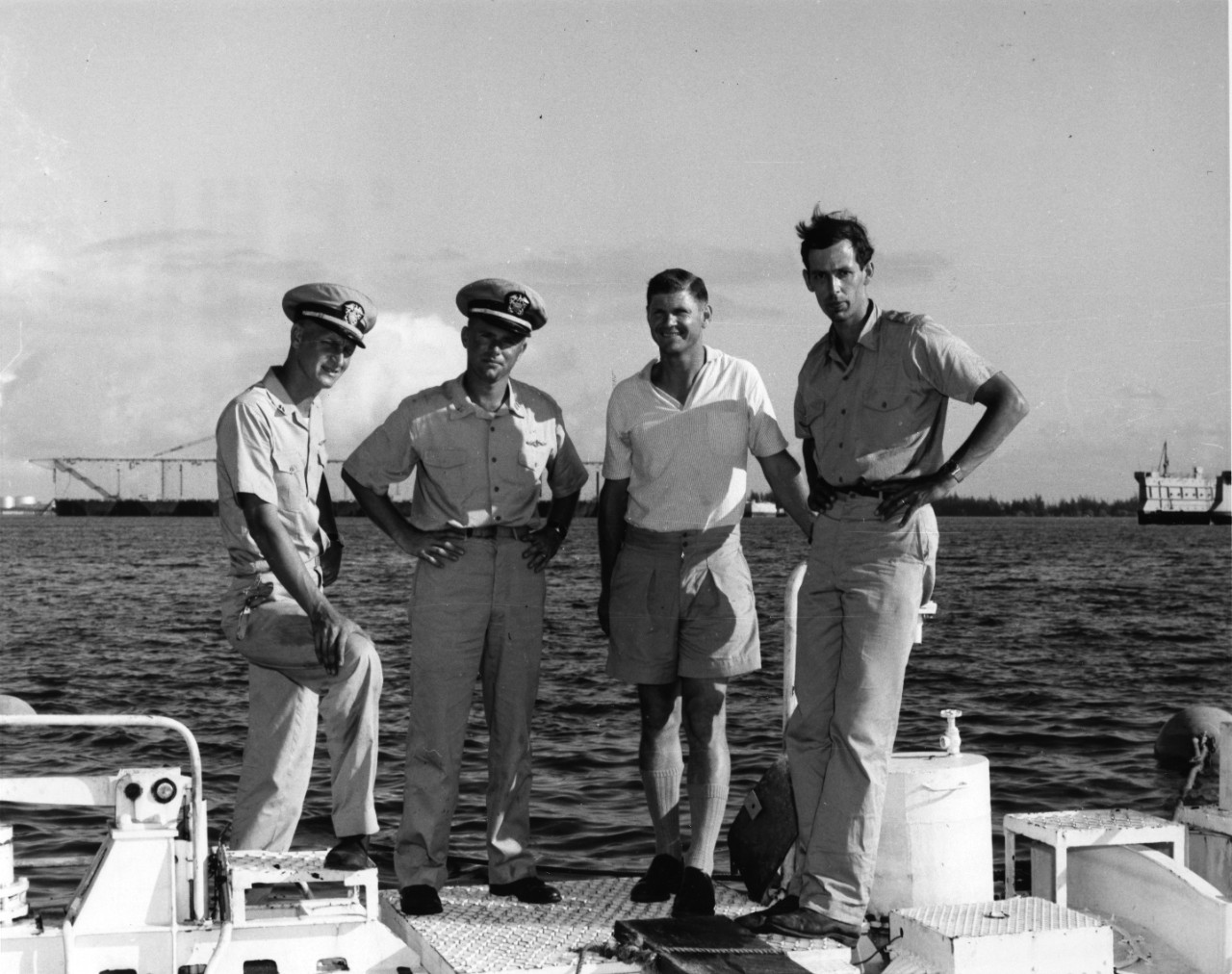
- Crew of the Bathyscaphe Trieste. Rechnitzer is third from the left
- Born: November 30, 1924; Escondido, California, US
- Died: August 22, 2005 (aged 80); La Mesa, California, US
- Education: Michigan State University, B.S. (1947); University of California, Los Angeles, M.S. (1951); Scripps Institution of Oceanography, Ph.D. (1955)
- Awards: Navy Distinguished Civilian Service Award
- Scientific career
- Fields: Oceanography
- Thesis: A serological approach to the systematics of the viviparous sea-perches, family Embiotocidae (1955)
- Doctoral advisor: Carl Hubbs

Andreas Buchwald Rechnitzer (November 30, 1924 – August 22, 2005) was an American oceanographer. With Carl Hubbs, he discovered the striped yellow butterfly fish that served as the logo of Birch Aquarium. He helped develop the first SCUBA diving training program for ocean scientists, which included such innovations as ditch-and-don, buddy breathing, and the buddy system. He was a member of the US Navy Office of Naval Research team that negotiated the purchase of the bathyscape Trieste, and was the scientist in charge of Project Nekton in 1960, during which the Trieste entered the Challenger Deep, the deepest surveyed point in the world's oceans. For this he received the Navy Distinguished Civilian Service Award. He joined the scientific staff of the Chief of Naval Operations, where he was the Oceanographer of the Navy from 1970 to 1984, and was the Senior Scientist at Science Applications International Corporation from 1985 to 1998.

== Biography ==
Andreas Buchwald Rechnitzer was born in on Escondido, California, on November 30, 1924. During World War II he graduated from the United States Naval Reserve Midshipmen's School at Fort Schuyler, New York, in 1945, and was commissioned as an ensign in the US Naval Reserve. He returned to college after the war and earned a Bachelor of Science degree from Michigan State University in 1947 and a Master of Science from the University of California at Los Angeles in 1951. He wrote his 1955 Doctor of Philosophy thesis on A serological approach to the systematics of the viviparous sea-perches, family Embiotocidae under the supervision of Carl Hubbs at the Scripps Institution of Oceanography. With Hubbs he discovered the striped yellow fish that served as the logo of Birch Aquarium.

In 1950, while still a graduate student, Rechnitzer and Conrad (Connie) Limbaugh devised the first SCUBA diving training program for ocean scientists, although the term SCUBA had not yet been coined. Their course included such innovations as ditch-and-don, buddy breathing, and the buddy system. Their equipment consisted of two Aqualung diving regulators (the third and fourth sold in the United States), a triple-tank unit, and a single tank. There were no diving instructors or diving shops, and the wet suit had yet to be invented. They drafted the first unofficial training, operational and safety procedures. Training was conducted in the swimming pool at the La Jolla Beach and Tennis Club. During a dive to 100 feet (30 m) off Guadalupe Island, Mexico, Rechnitzer speared a new species of striped yellow butterfly fish, which was subsequently adopted for use on the logo of Birch Aquarium.

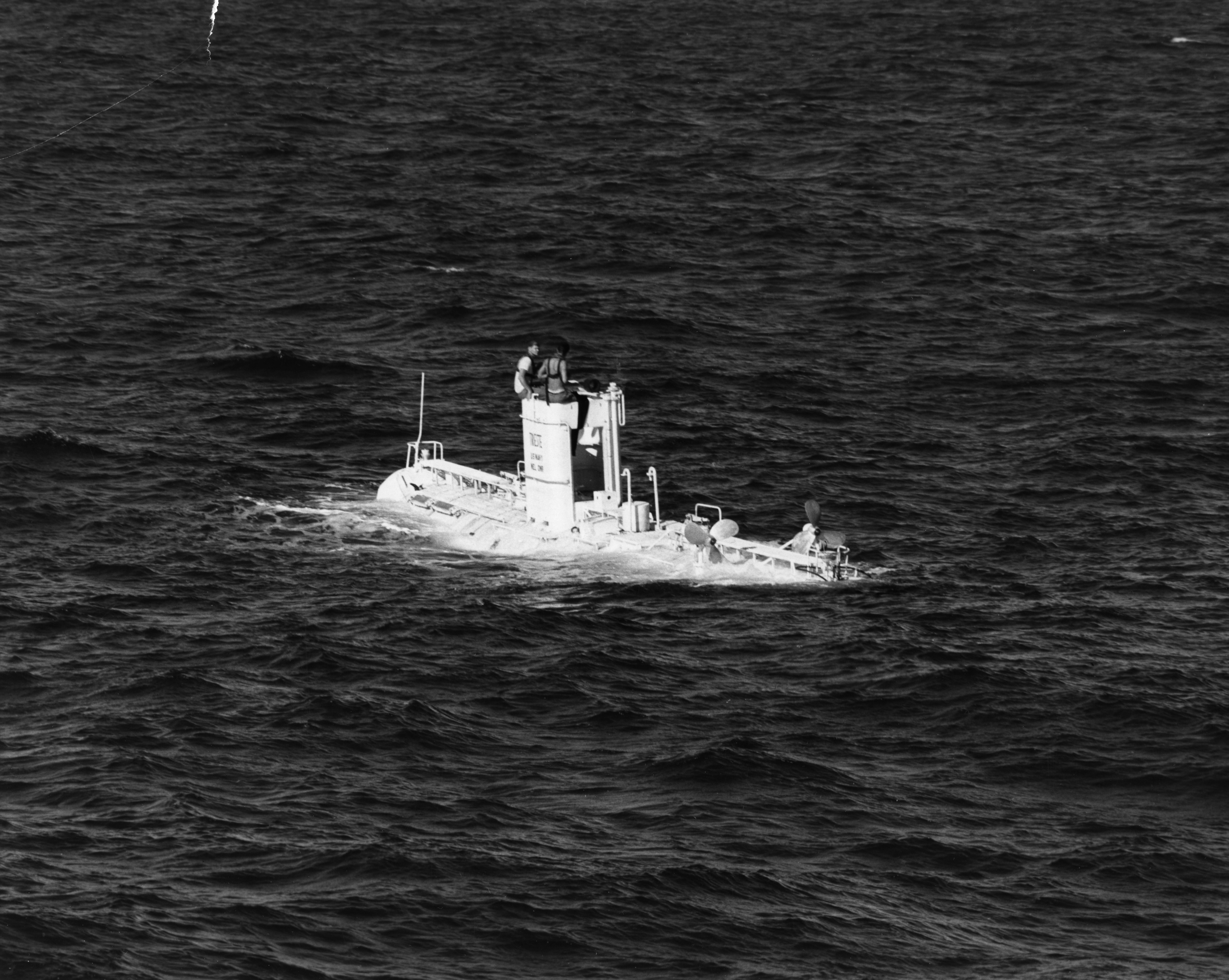
Bathyscaphe Trieste after her dive at 18,600 feet (5,700 m). Rechnitzer is on the conning tower, at left.

After graduating from Scripps, Rechnitzer became the Deep Submergence Research Program Coordinator and Oceanographer at the Naval Electronics Laboratory in San Diego. In this role he was instrumental in persuading the US Navy to purchase the bathyscape Trieste, from Swiss physicist Auguste Piccard. In the Trieste he made a descent to 18,150 feet (5,530 m), a record at the time. He was the scientist in charge of Project Nekton in 1960, during which the Trieste entered the Challenger Deep, the deepest surveyed point in the world's oceans, and dived to 35,800 feet (10,900 m). For this he received the Navy Distinguished Civilian Service Award from President Dwight D. Eisenhower. He then went to Rockwell International, where he was in charge of the development of the Beaver IV submersible.

Rechnitzer left Rockwell in 1970, and became the Science and Technology Advisor in the Office of the Chief of Naval Operations. He headed the Navy's Deep Submergence Systems Division from 1970 to 1973, and then served as Oceanographer of the Navy from 1974 to 1978. He became an adjunct professor at the Naval Postgraduate School in 1977. In 1974, he was the US Navy representative on the National Geographic and Duke University expedition to determine the location of the wreck of the USS Monitor, an American Civil War-era ironclad warship. He was also involved in the discovery of the wreck of the British Royal Mail Steamship Tweed, which sank on Scorpion Reef in 1847, and the English merchantman Holiday that sank there in 1823.

Awards Rechnitzer received included the Academy of Underwater Arts and Sciences' NOGI Award for sciences in 1968, for distinguished Service in 1989, and for sports and education in 1999 and 2007. He is the only person to have won the NOGI award three times. He was made an honorary citizen of the city of San Diego and an honorary life member of the National Geographic Society. He was the Diego Chamber of Commerce's Outstanding Man of the Year in 1960 and 1961.

== Death ==
Rechnitzer died at Grossmont Hospital in La Mesa, California, on August 22, 2005. He was survived by his wife Alice, daughter Andrea, and sons, David, Martin and Michael.

== See also ==
- Category:Taxa named by Andreas Rechnitzer
