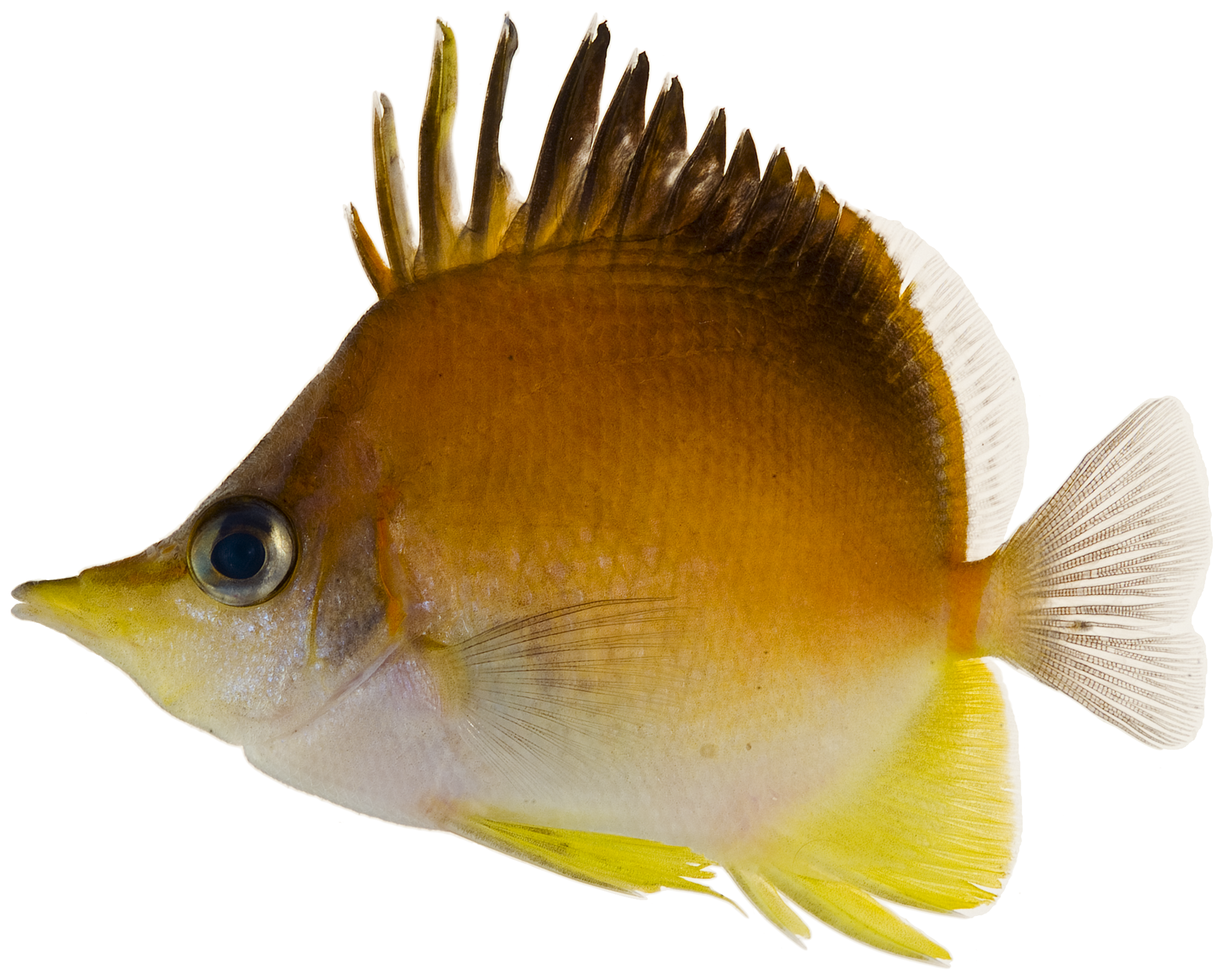

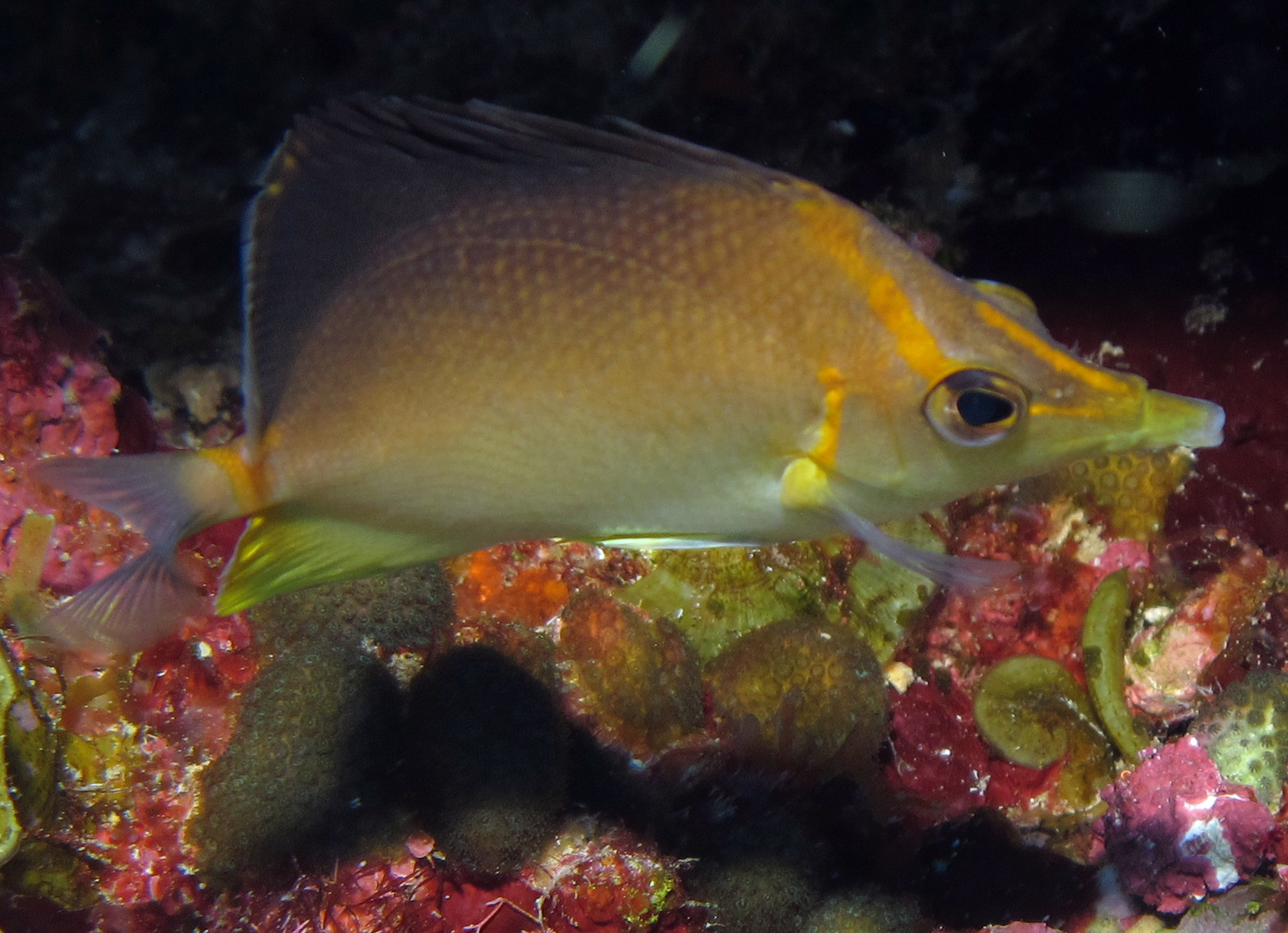

Conservation status
- Least Concern (IUCN 3.1)

Scientific classification
- Kingdom: Animalia
- Phylum: Chordata
- Class: Actinopterygii
- Order: Acanthuriformes
- Family: Chaetodontidae
- Genus: Prognathodes
- Species: P. aculeatus

Binomial name
- Prognathodes aculeatus (Poey, 1860)

Synonyms
- Chaetodon aculeatus Chaetodon unicolor Chelmo pelta Chelmon aculeatus

= Prognathodes aculeatus =

Species of fish

Prognathodes aculeatus, or the longsnout butterflyfish, is a species of butterflyfish found in tropical West Atlantic waters. It is also known as the butterbun, the Caribbean longsnout butterflyfish or Poey's butterflyfish. This species may often be confused with the banded longsnout butterflyfish (Chelmon rostratus).

== Scientific name ==
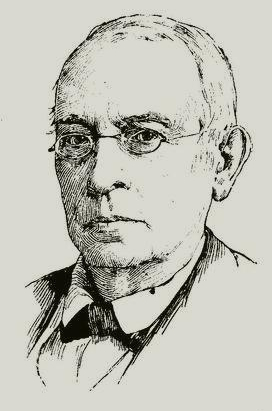
Felipe Poey, the accepted binomial authority for the longsnout butterflyfish

The longsnout butterflyfish was first described in 1860 by Felipe Poey y Aloy and Albert C. L. G. Günther in two separate reports. Between them the fish was given three separate scientific names each one in a different genus, though Poey's assignment of the species to Prognathodes is the only valid combination. It was again described in 1880 by Sauvage who gave it yet another scientific name that has since been synonymized into P. aculeatus.

== Description ==
An average of 2 to 3 in (5–7.5 cm) long, the longsnout butterflyfish is commonly known for its namesake long snout that is much more distinctive than those of similar species. They also have a dusky to yellow colored stripe that runs almost vertically from the top of the head to the eyes (unlike the stripes on other butterflyfishes which extend past the eyes).

The upper half of the longsnout butterflyfish is yellow that changes to orange and again darkens to brownish-orange. The dorsal fin of the fish is usually black.

== Habitat and range ==
Fairly common throughout its range, the longsnout butterflyfish is found on natural and artificial reefs, usually 30 to 200 ft (10–60 m) in depth. It can be found off Florida, in the Gulf of Mexico, in the Caribbean Sea, and off the coast of Venezuela.

== Behavior ==
Longsnout butterflyfish are much more solitary than many other members of their family. They also inhabit deeper reefs and spend much of their time foraging in recesses for invertebrates. It is also known to eat the tube feet of sea urchins and tube worm tentacles. Unlike many other members of its family, the longsnout butterflyfish does not pick parasites from other fish.
