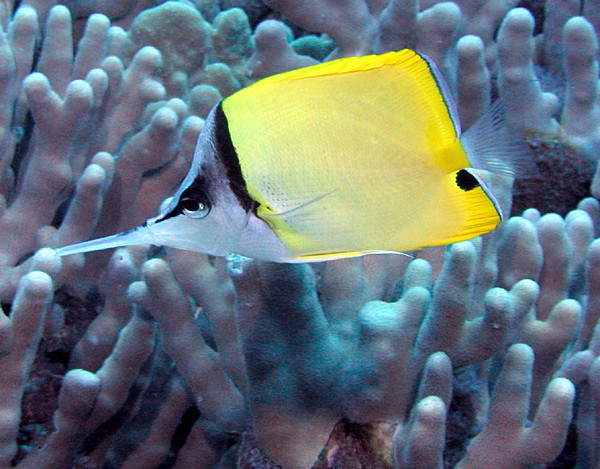
- Forcipiger longirostris

Conservation status
- Least Concern (IUCN 3.1)

Scientific classification
- Kingdom: Animalia
- Phylum: Chordata
- Class: Actinopterygii
- Division: Teleostei
- Order: Acanthuriformes
- Family: Chaetodontidae
- Genus: Forcipiger
- Species: F. longirostris

Binomial name
- Forcipiger longirostris (Broussonet, 1782)
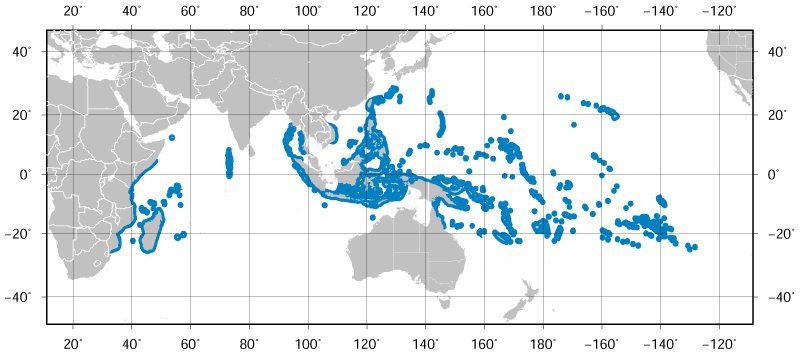
- Longnose butterflyfish range.

Synonyms
- Chaetodon longirostris Broussonet, 1782; Chelmo longirostris (Broussonet, 1782); Prognathodes longirostris (Broussonet, 1782); Forcipiger inornatus Randall, 1961; Forcipiger cyrano Randall, 1961

= Forcipiger longirostris =

Longnose butterflyfish

Species of fish

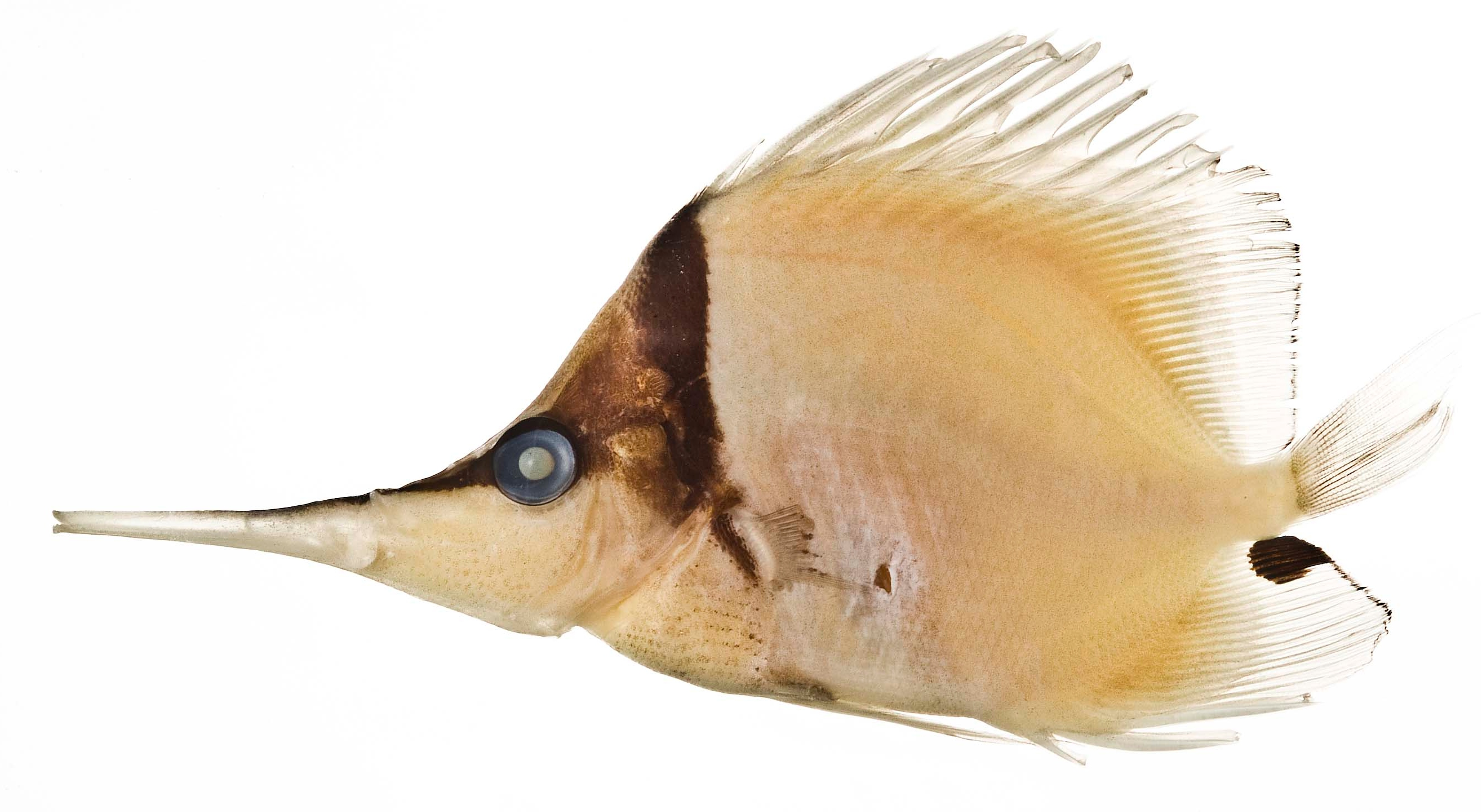
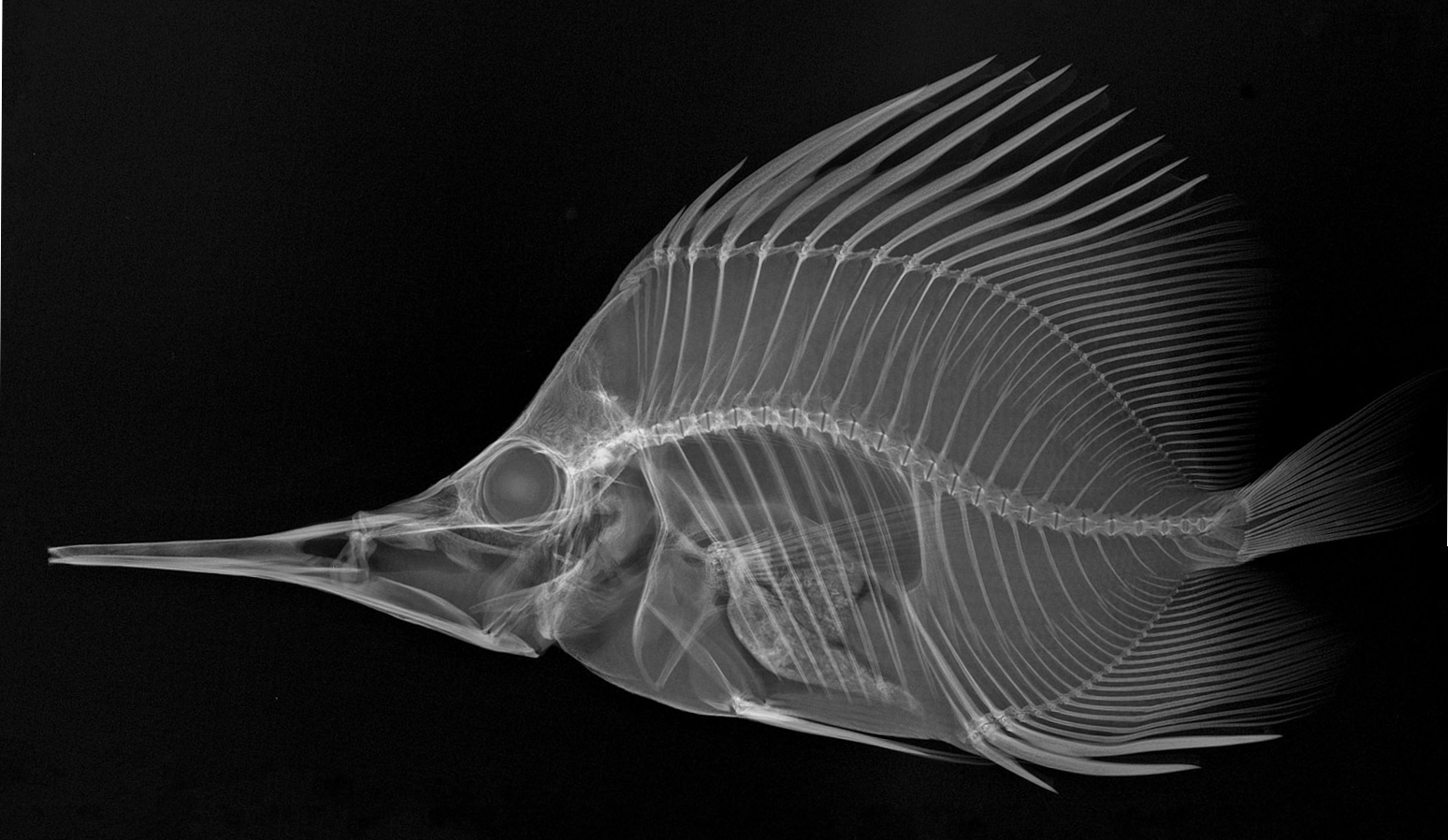
Conventional and X-ray images of Forcipiger longirostris

Forcipiger longirostris, commonly known as the longnose butterflyfish or big longnose butterflyfish, is a species of butterflyfish found on coral reefs throughout the tropical waters of the Indo-Pacific. Even with its distinctive, point-like long nose, the longnose butterflyfish still can easily be confused with its more common cousin F. flavissimus. Both species may be kept in aquariums.

== Description ==
F. longirostris has a compressed yellow body with a black triangular region on its head, and as the name implies, a long, silvery snout. Usually 10 or 11 dorsal spines, a black spot on the anal fin, and rows of small black spots on the breast are found. The fish grows to about 22 cm (8.7 in) in length. In comparison, F. flavissimus has more dorsal spines, lacks the black spots, and its operculum is more curved.

Rarely, F. longirostris can be found in an all-black form, as well, or the yellow portion may be brown.

== Behavior ==
F. longirostris is a diurnal omnivore, feeding mostly on small crustaceans, tube feet of echinoderms and sea urchins, and polychaete tentacles. Like other butterflyfish species, longnose butterflyfish mate for life.

== Nomenclature ==
F. longirostris, together with F. flavissimus, is known for having the longest fish name in the Hawaiian language: lauwiliwilinukunukuʻoiʻoi, or "long-snouted (sharp-beaked) fish shaped like a wiliwili leaf". It was the first Hawaiian fish to receive a scientific name, when Captain James Cook collected a specimen (this remains part of the British Museum collection).
