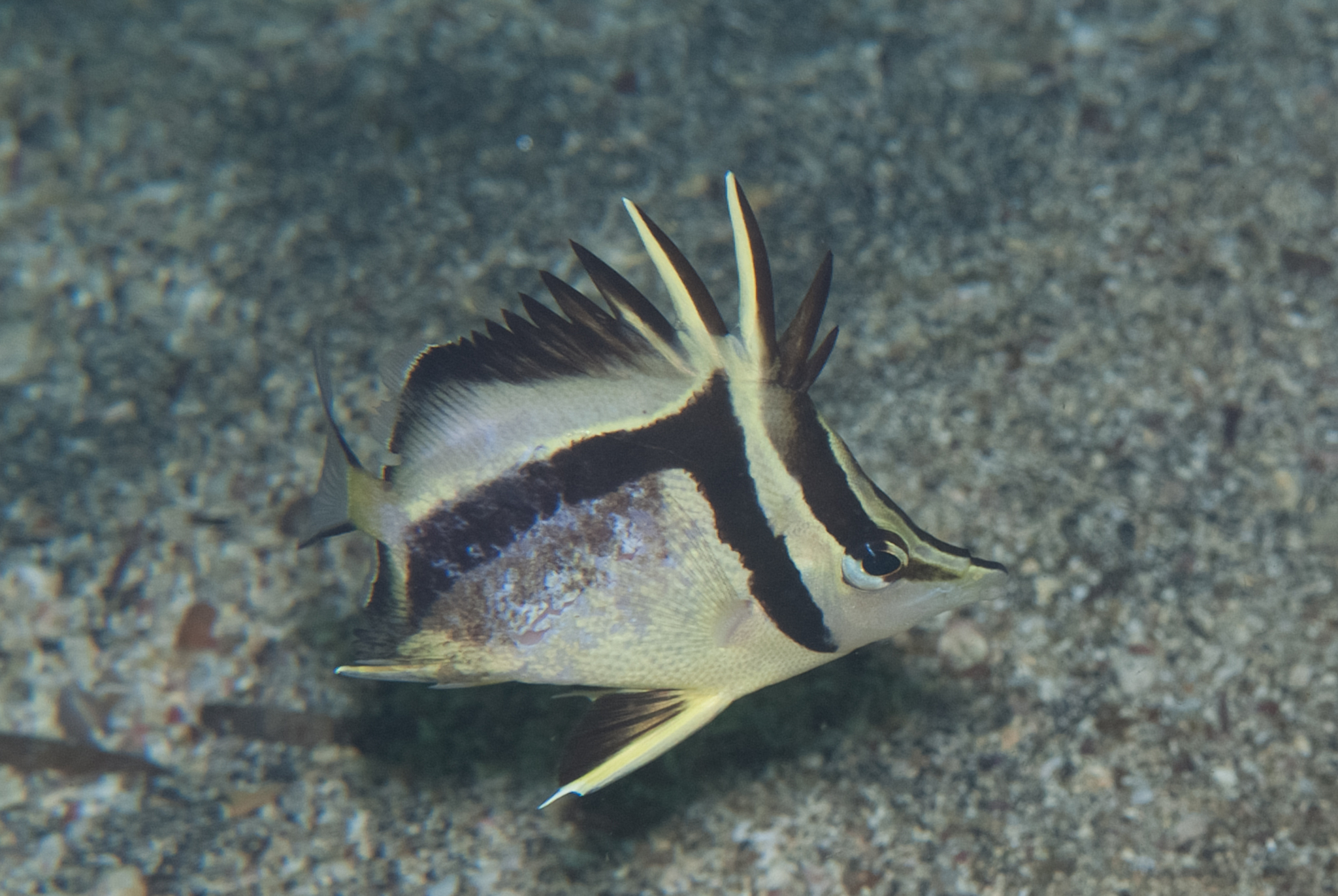

Conservation status
- Near Threatened (IUCN 3.1)

Scientific classification
- Kingdom: Animalia
- Phylum: Chordata
- Class: Actinopterygii
- Order: Acanthuriformes
- Family: Chaetodontidae
- Genus: Prognathodes
- Species: P. carlhubbsi

Binomial name
- Prognathodes carlhubbsi Nalbant, 1995

= Prognathodes carlhubbsi =

Species of fish

Prognathodes carlhubbsi, the southern scythemarked butterflyfish or southern scythe butterflyfish, is a species of butterflyfish found at rocky reefs in the tropical Eastern Pacific, where found at depths of 12–270 metres (39–886 ft) at the Galápagos Islands, Cocos Island, Malpelo Island, and off northwestern Peru. Until P. carlhubbsi was described as a separate species in 1995, populations in these regions were included in P. falcifer. When separated, the true P. falcifer is restricted to more northernly regions (off California and Mexico), and it has whitish-grey (not clear yellow) belly and flanks, the black line through the eye is paler and less distinct, and the angle of the inverted black "V" on the side is shallower.

== Etymology ==
Its specific name honors the American ichthyologist Carl L. Hubbs (1894-1979), who had been intending to describe this species when he died and who in 1958 he was the co-describer of the related Northern scythemarked butterflyfish Prognathodes falcifer.
