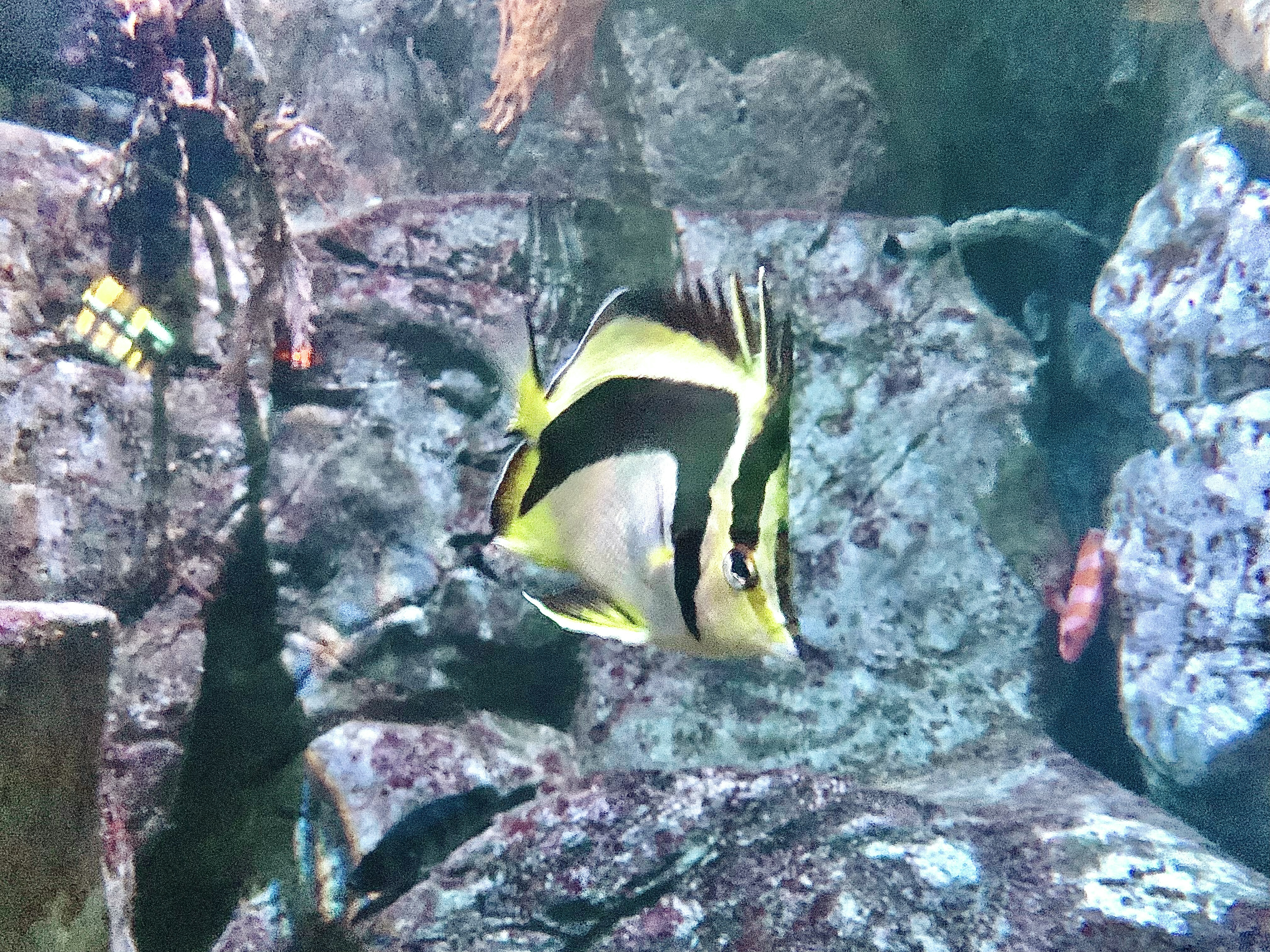

Conservation status
- Least Concern (IUCN 3.1)

Scientific classification
- Kingdom: Animalia
- Phylum: Chordata
- Class: Actinopterygii
- Order: Acanthuriformes
- Family: Chaetodontidae
- Genus: Prognathodes
- Species: P. falcifer

Binomial name
- Prognathodes falcifer (C. L. Hubbs & Rechnitzer, 1958)

Synonyms
- Chaetodon falcifer Hubbs & Rechnitzer, 1958

= Prognathodes falcifer =

Species of fish

Prognathodes falcifer, the northern scythemarked butterflyfish or northern scythe butterflyfish, is a species of butterflyfish found at rocky reefs in the tropical Eastern Pacific, where found at depths of 3–270 metres (9.8–885.8 ft) off southern California (La Jolla and Santa Catalina Island), southern Baja California, Guadalupe Island, San Benito Island and Revillagigedo Islands. In the past it also included populations off Central and South America, but in 1995 these were described as a separate species, P. carlhubbsi. Compared to that species, P. falcifer has whitish-grey (not clear yellow) belly and flanks, the black line through the eye is paler and less distinct, and the angle of the inverted black "V" on the side is shallower. It can be found in captivity on rare cases.
