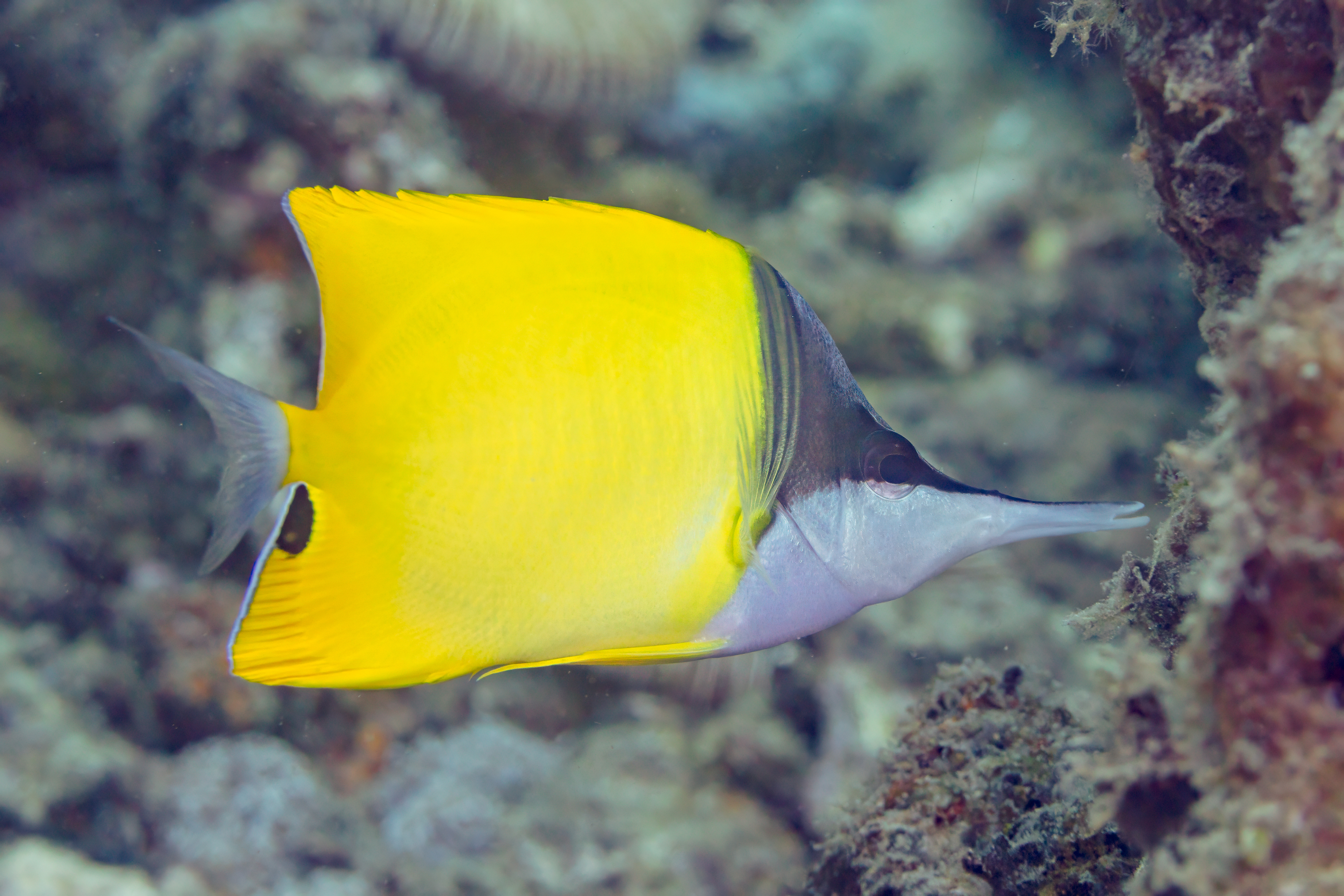

Conservation status
- Least Concern (IUCN 3.1)

Scientific classification
- Kingdom: Animalia
- Phylum: Chordata
- Class: Actinopterygii
- Division: Teleostei
- Order: Acanthuriformes
- Family: Chaetodontidae
- Genus: Forcipiger
- Species: F. flavissimus

Binomial name
- Forcipiger flavissimus D. S. Jordan & E. A. McGregor, 1898

= Yellow longnose butterflyfish =

Species of marine fish in the family Chaetodontidae

The yellow longnose butterflyfish (Forcipiger flavissimus), also known as the forceps butterflyfish or forcepsfish, is a species of marine fish in the family Chaetodontidae.

This species can be found in the aquarium trade, and grows up to 22 cm (8.7 in) in length.

== Range and distribution ==
The yellow longnose butterflyfish is widespread throughout the tropical waters of the Indo-Pacific area from the eastern coast of Africa to Hawaii, Red Sea included, and is also found in the eastern Pacific Ocean from Baja California to the Revillagigedo Islands and the Galapagos.

== Territoriality ==
Being territorial, yellow longnose butterflyfish patrol their patches of coral with a monogamous partner. However, instances of overt aggression among F. flavissimus have been observed between territory holders and individuals of the same sex. Chasing is rare, but when it does occur, males chase males and females chase females. Females defend food resources from other females, while males defend territories containing a female from other males.

Territoriality is a favorable strategy for a species to adopt primarily when resources are temporally stable, predictable, and evenly distributed throughout a territory. Territoriality is commonly displayed by benthic-feeding longnose butterflyfish, therefore, because their main dietary resources fulfill these characteristics. Their monogamous pairing appears to be closely linked to their territorial behavior. Although several could cause a species to evolve monogamous behavior, the necessity for biparental care does not apply to longnose butterflyfish because they lay pelagic, or freely floating, eggs. One source of selective pressure responsible for the monogamous pairs observed could be the advantage of territorial defense it provides. Monogamy is favored when a pair makes the defense of one or more resources more efficient than defense by a solitary individual. Longnose butterflyfish pairs have been confirmed by studies to be heterosexual and pair fidelity has been observed for periods of up to seven or more years.

Besides the advertisement displays accomplished through monogamous pairing, territorial domination by longnose butterflyfish has also been observed by means of acoustic behaviors, which provide important cues and social signals during fish communication. Emitting sounds through complicated body movements is another technique they use to advertise territorial boundaries. Potential rivals are able to assess body size of a competitor based on the duration and intensity of the sound a yellow longnose butterflyfish produces. The duration and intensity of the sounds emitted during antagonistic behaviors, such as the defense of one's territory, often predict the ability of an individual to secure that territory. A sound of long duration and high intensity, therefore, often indicates an individual has a large territory. Defending territory is the strategy these species adopt to compete for and maximize their claims over resources.
