= Tonasa Formation =

Geological formation in Sulawesi, Indonesia

The Tonasa Formation is a geological formation that is located in Sulawesi, Indonesia. It is one of most widespread carbonate rock formation and also one of the most beautiful karst topography in South Sulawesi. It cover several regencies such as Maros, Pangkep, Barru, and Jeneponto. Based on the sediment and foraminifera remains (Discoaster, Sphenolithus, etc.), most researchers regard Tonasa Formation as a shallow ocean habitat that come from late Eocene to Miocene age rock. The presence of echinoids, coralline, and alveolonids fossils also support this idea.

Regarding fossils, the formation mainly known for its collection of marine fish fossils. Most of the fossils discoveries were made in Maros district specifically Patanuang Asu Village. As mentioned before, the biota found here are mostly shallow coral reel resident. L. F. de Beaufort, who was among the first to studied the fossils extensively during 1920s, reported various taxa both from extant and extinct genera. Some of them yield numerous specimens (more than 50) and preserved beautifully. Unfortunately, many of them are poorly studied and haven't restudied hence still having outdated taxa name.

== Paleobiota ==
Genus	Species	Material	Notes	Images
Balistes	B. sp.	Almost complete body fossils measuring 2 cm long.	Dorsal spine taking almost 1/4 of body length and seems to have a rounded caudal fin	
Brouweria	B. robusta	Partial head and body fossils	Genus of elopid that are said to have large body size.	
Brouweria	B. striata	Partial head and body fossils	Genus of elopid that are said to have large body size.	
Caranx	C. baltruschi	Partial rear body fossils	Two species of carangid that have well developed lateral plates.	
Caranx	C. femeri	Partial rear body fossils	Two species of carangid that have well developed lateral plates.	
Chelmon	C. fossilis	Partial anterior part of the body including skull	Seems to have a lower body profile that living species. The original description wrote the genus as "Chelmos"	
Clupea	C. brouweri	Numerous specimens; 55 specimens are known that preserved most of the body except the head	The fish average length is 15 cm and seems to lived in large number not unlike modern species	
Cybium	C. intermedium	Several specimens that preserved the head up to first dorsal fin partially	The fish is said to be an intermediate form between "Cybium" (Scomberomorus) and Scomber hence the intermedium name	
Holocentrus	H. sp.	Single specimen that is preserved poorly only showing opercular bones, spine, some scales, and anal spine	The third anal spine is very long even compared to modern species while the opercular spines are wide; the original paper wrote the genus as "Holocentrum"	
Lutjanus	L. sp.	Single specimen consist of rear portion of the fish that preserved the caudal fin beautifully	Beaufort said that the fish have more fin rays than most species he compared except Lutjanus sebae	
Marosichthys	M. huismani	Single specimen consist the head and some of its dorsal fin spines	Reexamination suggest that this species closest extant relatives come from Naso genera	
Mastygocercus	M. vermiformis	Single specimen consist of the rear portion of the fish	The fossil show that Mastygocercus have a whip-like tail that devoid of caudal fin rays	
Protohimantura	P. vorstmani	Single specimen consist of anterior part of the fish	Originally described as Trygon vorstmani	
Sphyraena	S. crassidens	Several specimens are known from Tonasa Formation and also Java	It have proportionally large eyes compared to other species	

There are several specimens that Beaufort did not give specific genera or species:

1. Gadidae indet. that come from 30 mm fish that Beufort theorized as a juvenile fish. Most of its head is missing with some of its fins are the best preserved aspect of the fossil.
2. Pomacentridae indet. that come from small fish (60 mm) that preserved most of the fish except the head parts
3. Sparidae indet. that come from two specimens that Beaufort estimated to have 130 mm length. The fish mouth is said to be very protractile and lined up with two form of teeth (conical in the rear and canine-like in the front). For the posterior part, these fish seem to have forked caudal fin although only the lower lobe has been preserved
4. Scopelidae indet. (Scopelidae is a defunct family that most of its member are moved to lanternfish group) that consist of head and anterior part of the body of small fish including dentary, preoperculum, some cycloid scales, and dorsal rays with trace of some fin preserved.
