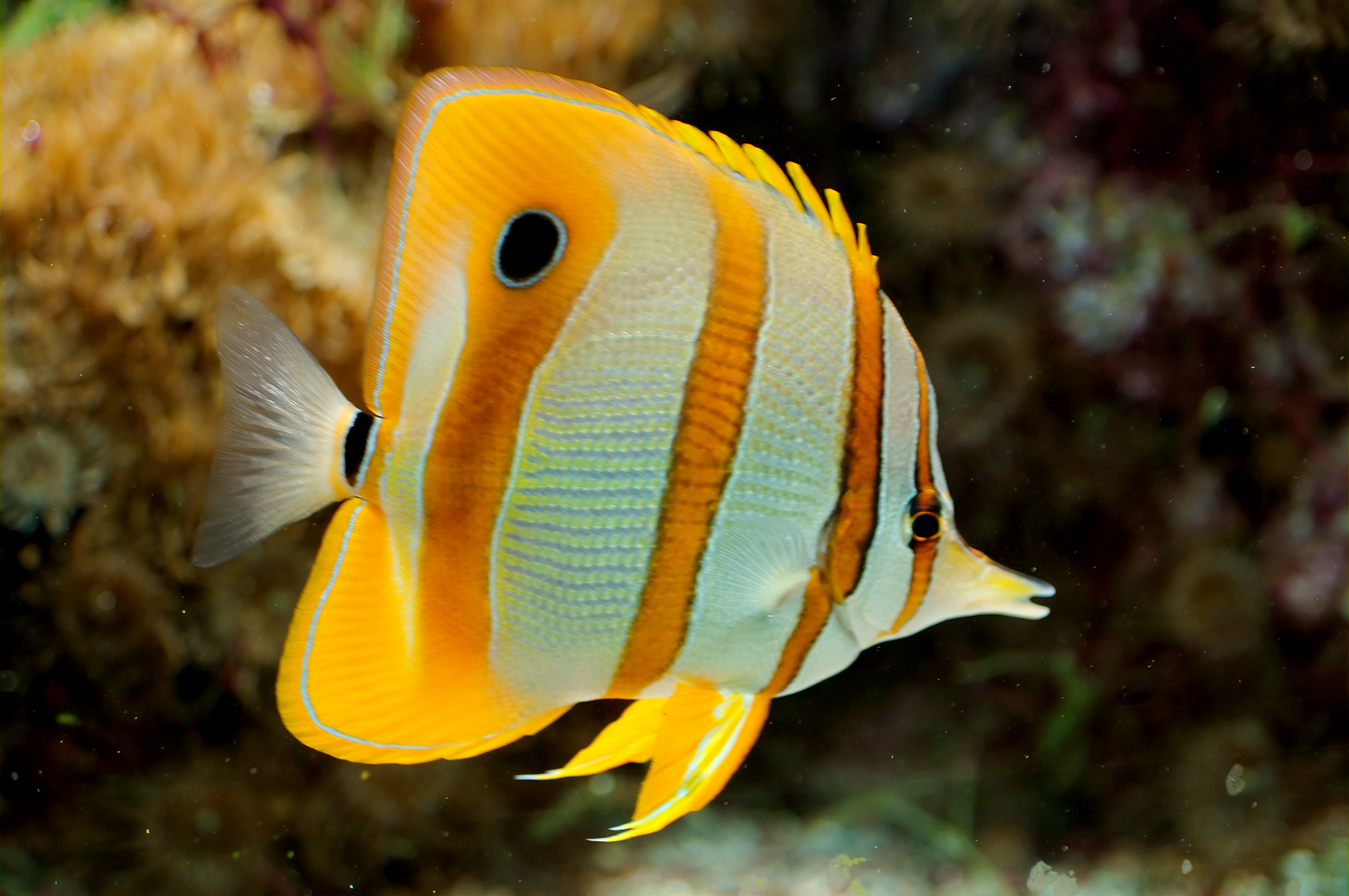

Conservation status
- Least Concern (IUCN 3.1)

Scientific classification
- Kingdom: Animalia
- Phylum: Chordata
- Class: Actinopterygii
- Division: Teleostei
- Order: Acanthuriformes
- Family: Chaetodontidae
- Genus: Chelmon
- Species: C. rostratus

Binomial name
- Chelmon rostratus (Linnaeus, 1758)

Synonyms
- Chaetodon rostratus Linnaeus, 1758; Chelmo rostratus (Linnaeus, 1758); Chaetodon enceladus Shaw, 1791; Chelmon lol Montrouzier, 1857

= Copperband butterflyfish =

Species of fish

The copperband butterflyfish (Chelmon rostratus), also known as the beaked coral fish, is found in reefs in both the Pacific and Indian Oceans. This butterflyfish is one of the three species that make up the genus Chelmon and all have long beaks.

== Description ==
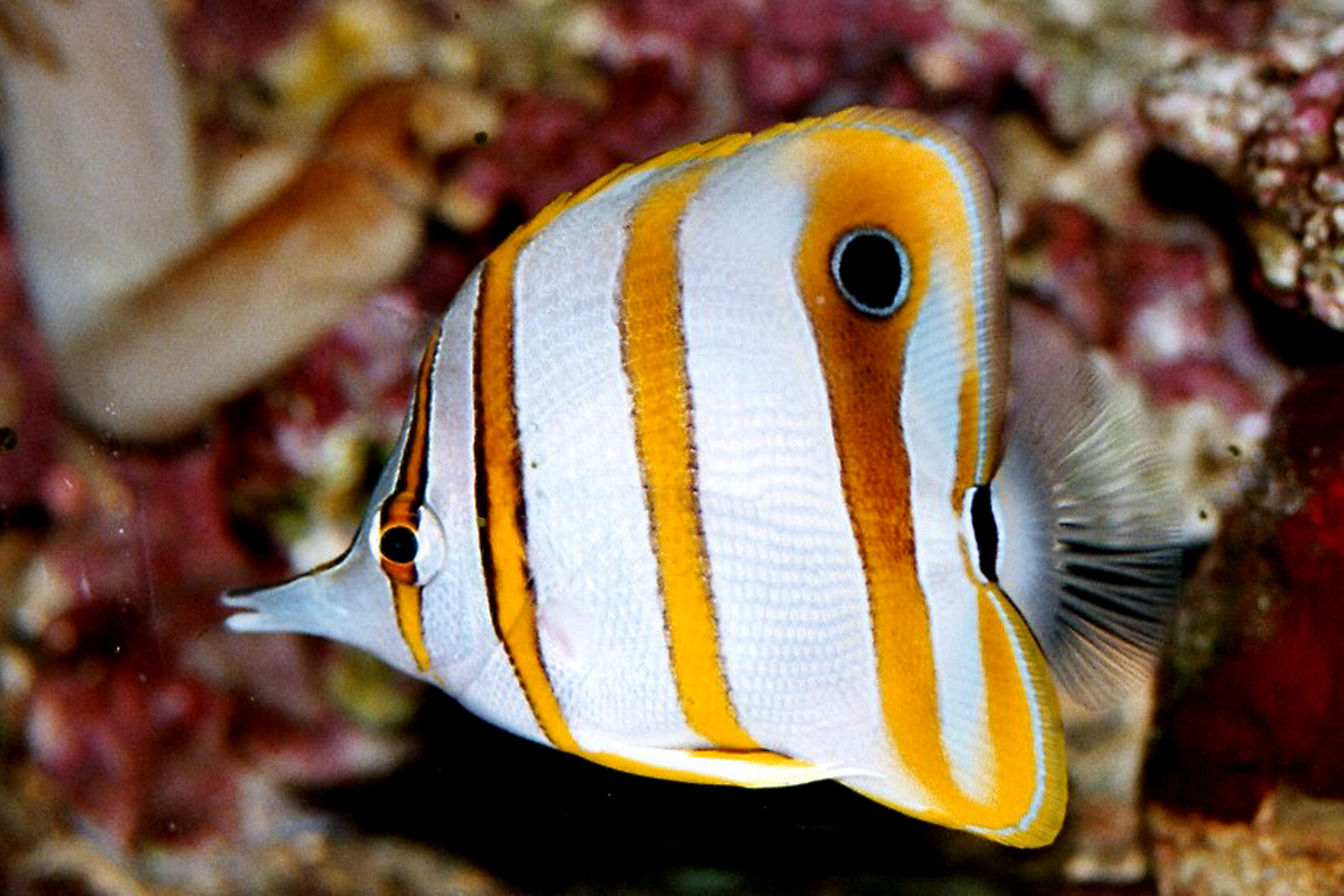
At the Cologne Zoo

These fish are easily identified by the yellow banding and long snout. The young fish are similar in appearance to adult fish. Butterflyfish grow up to 20 cm in length. The fish appears taller than its length because of its compressed, deep-bodied form with a long dorsal and posterior fins as well as its vertical yellow stripes on a white background. The snout is long and slender, and the dark eye of the fish is less conspicuous than the dark eye-spot on the dorsal fin. The base of the tail features a dark band that runs perpendicular to the tail. Butterflyfish may be distinguished from the similar C. marginalis by their color pattern and number of dorsal fin rays.

== Habitat ==
Copperband butterflyfish are found at depths of 1−25 metres either alone or in pairs. These fish form monogamous pairs during breeding. They are usually found on coral reefs or rocky shorelines, and also in estuaries and silty inner reefs. This species is territorial and oviparous.

== In the aquarium ==
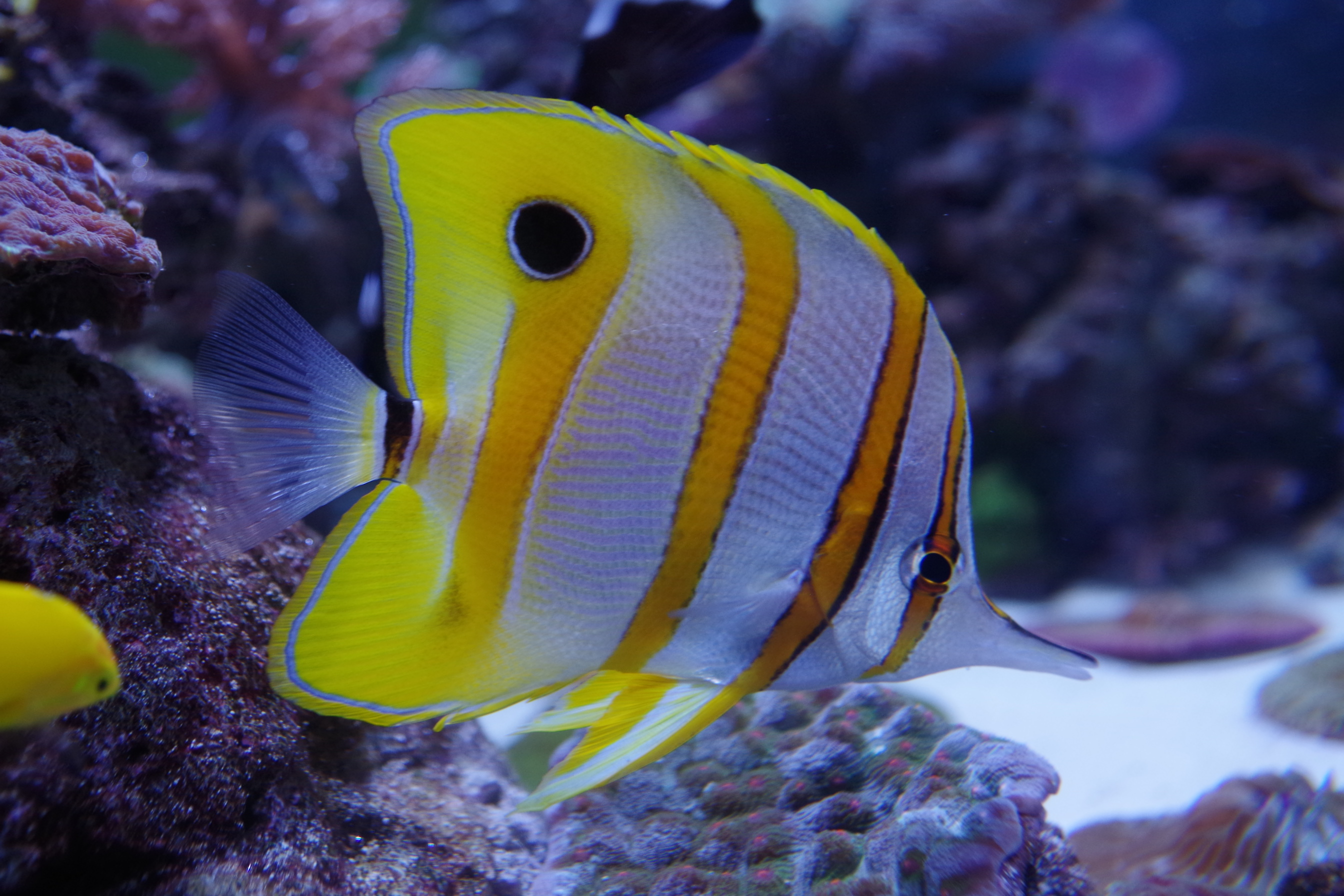
Aquarium of the Pacific

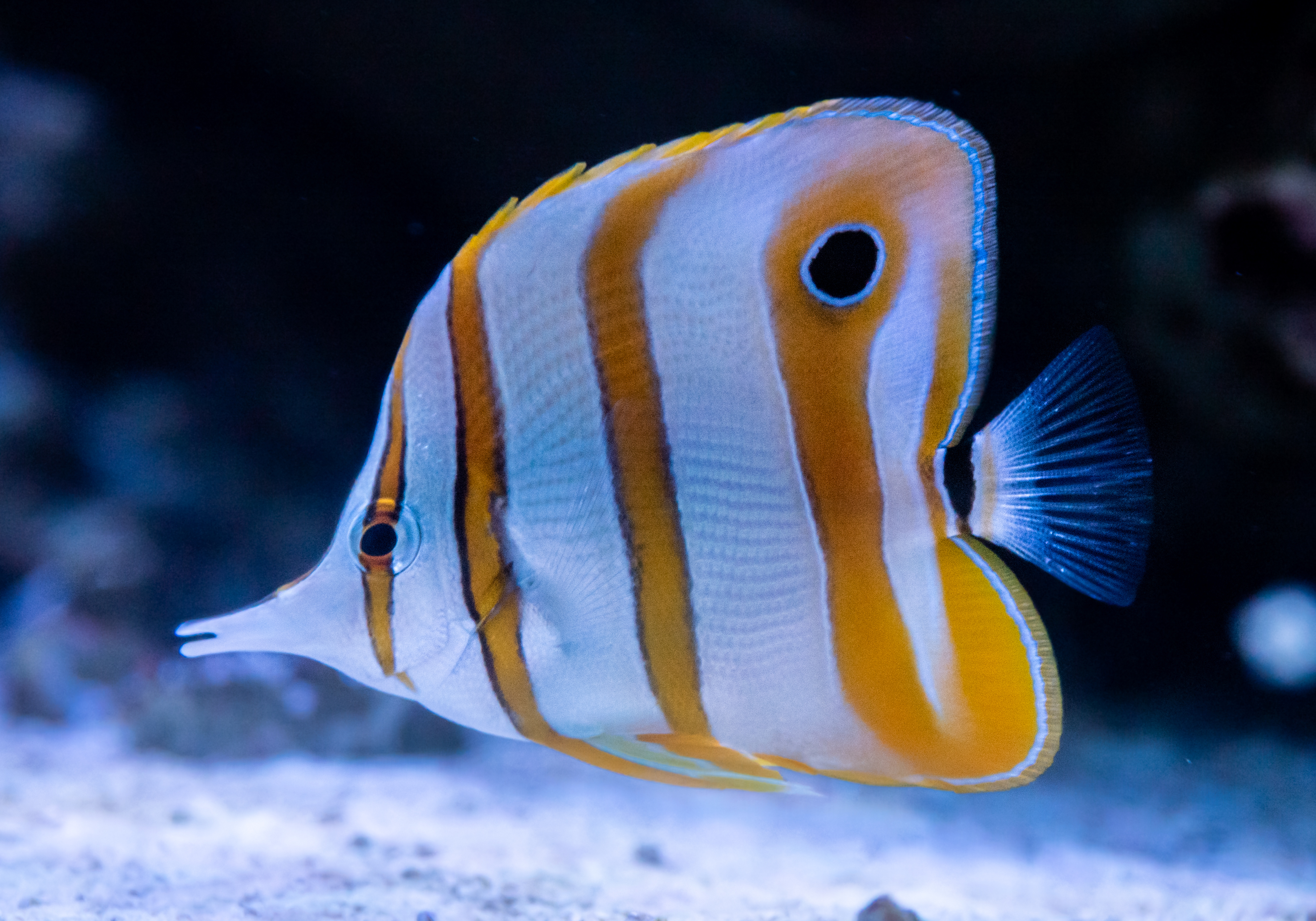
Leningrad Zoo

Copperband butterflyfish can grow to 8 inches (20 cm) but in a home aquarium are usually half that size. They do well at a normal reef temperature range of 75 to 84 °F (24 to 29 °C), with a tank size of at least 75 gallons and plenty of live rock to graze on. This species can be considered reef safe. It will eat many invertebrates, including parasitic forms such as tubeworms, Calliactis parasitica and common glass anemone (Aiptasia, parasitic anemone). Many aquarists introduce the Copperband Butterfly just to get rid of these pests without giving consideration to their long term needs for survival. Given a choice, Aiptasia is the least favored food. The butterflyfish preys on all tube and substrate worms, clams, and mollusks. This is not a recommended fish for inexperienced aquarists, as it requires excellent tank conditions to thrive or even survive.
