= Caranx femeri =

Caranx femeri Temporal range: Miocene
- Reconstruction of C. femeri (top) and C. baltruschi

Scientific classification
- Kingdom: Animalia
- Phylum: Chordata
- Class: Actinopterygii
- Division: Teleostei
- Order: Carangiformes
- Suborder: Carangoidei
- Family: Carangidae
- Genus: Caranx
- Species: †C. femeri

Binomial name
- †Caranx femeri de Beaufort, 1926

Species of fish

Caranx femeri was a species of fossil marine fish that lived in South Sulawesi during the Miocene epoch. It is one of two Caranx species that were found in Tonasa Formation, the other being C. baltruschi. The former name is given to honour an engineer named S. Femer that come from Maros, South Sulawesi. C. femeri is known from three specimens that unfortunately lacking the head part. The preserved specimens show that C. femeri have long pectoral fins similar to extant Caranx species. Its pectoral fin reach to the fourth haemal spine while the pelvic fin is two third of the pectoral length. Beufort in his original description allied C. femeri with C. melampygus.
