= Sphyraena crassidens =

Sphyraena crassidens Temporal range: Miocene–Pleistocene

Scientific classification
- Kingdom: Animalia
- Phylum: Chordata
- Class: Actinopterygii
- Division: Teleostei
- Order: Carangiformes
- Suborder: Centropomoidei
- Family: Sphyraenidae
- Genus: Sphyraena
- Species: †S. crassidens

Binomial name
- †Sphyraena crassidens de Beaufort, 1926

Extinct species of fish

Sphyraena crassidens is a species of barracuda that lived during the Miocene until Plio-Pleistocene epoch. Its fossils have been found in Indonesia from two locations. The holotype and two other specimens, which consists of skull and partial body fossil, were described from Tonasa Formation, South Sulawesi. Additional specimens (jaws and teeth) referred as S. crassidens have also been reported from Java.

The largest skull of these three specimens measured 90 mm in length. Beaufort wrote that S. crassidens have eyes larger than extant species. The canines are rather blunt and broad at base while some of the other teeth area long, curved proximally with very small serrations. The jaw is said to be thin and straight. Its rear parts especially the tail fin are unknown since surviving specimens only preserved partially.
