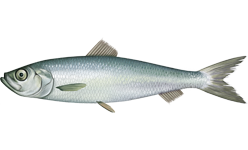

Conservation status
- Least Concern (IUCN 3.1)

Scientific classification
- Kingdom: Animalia
- Phylum: Chordata
- Class: Actinopterygii
- Division: Teleostei
- Order: Clupeiformes
- Family: Clupeidae
- Genus: Clupea
- Species: C. harengus

Binomial name
- Clupea harengus Linnaeus, 1758
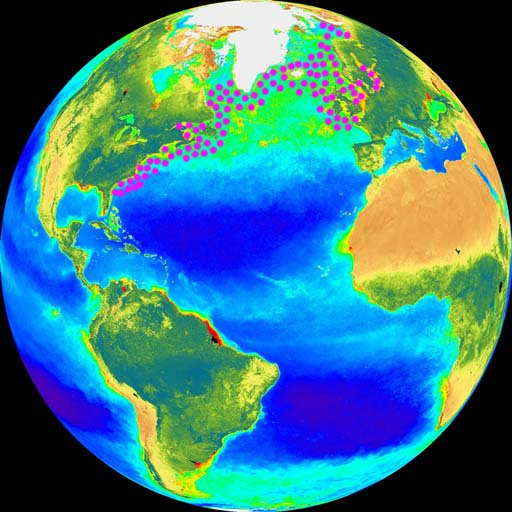
- Distribution on a NASA SeaWIFS image

= Atlantic herring =

Species of fish

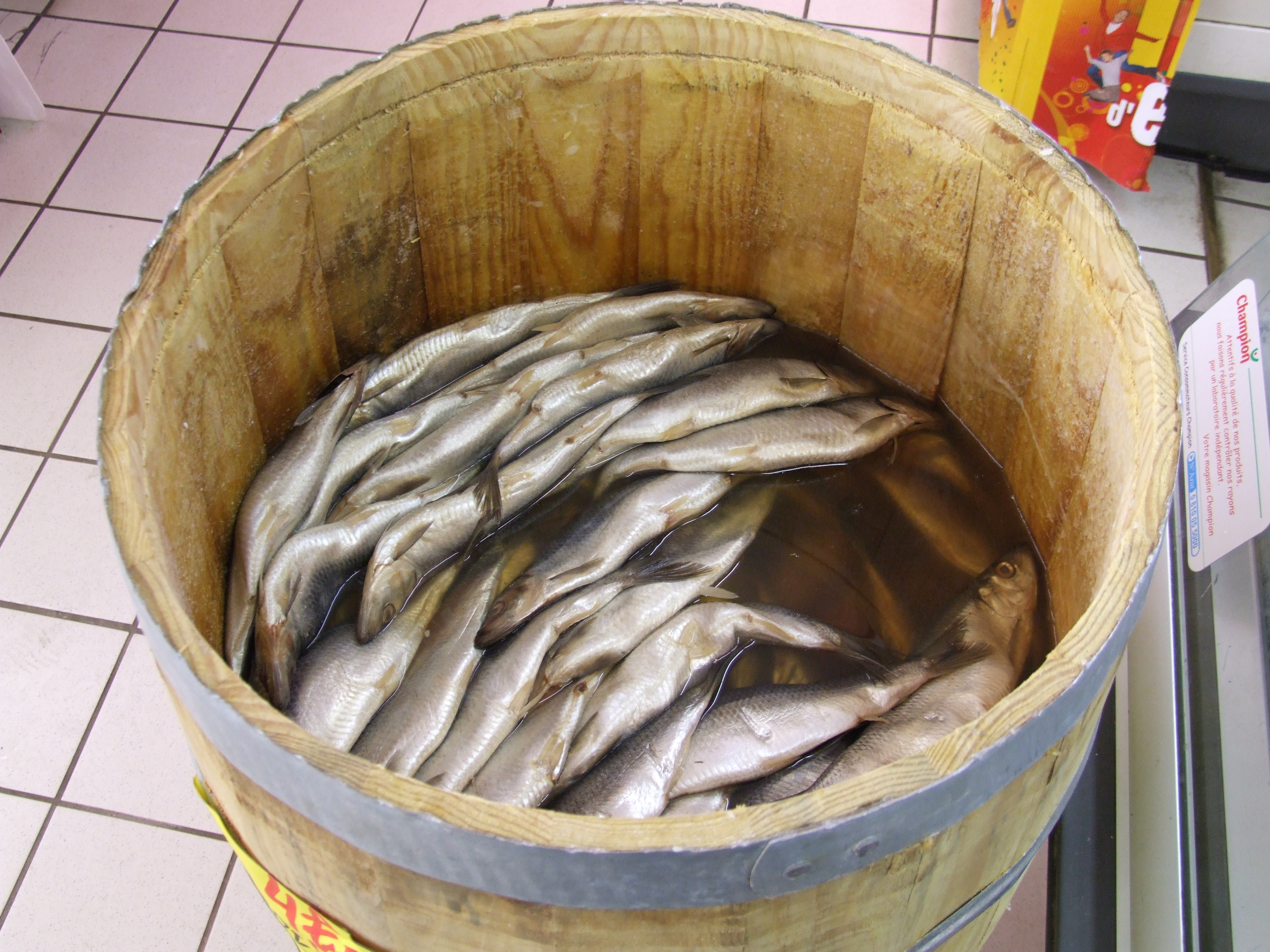
Clupea harengus in a barrel

Atlantic herring (Clupea harengus) is a herring in the family Clupeidae. It is one of the most abundant fish species in the world. Atlantic herrings can be found on both sides of the northern Atlantic Ocean, congregating in large schools. They can grow up to 45 centimetres (18 in) in length and weigh up to 1.1 kilograms (2.4 lb). They feed on copepods, krill and small fish, while their natural predators are seals, whales, cod and other larger fish.

The Atlantic herring fishery has long been an important part of the economy of New England and the Atlantic provinces of Canada. This is because the fish congregate relatively near to the coast in massive schools, notably in the cold waters of the semi-enclosed Gulf of Maine and Gulf of St. Lawrence. North Atlantic herring schools have been measured up to 4 cubic kilometres (0.96 cu mi) in size, containing an estimated four billion fish.

== Description ==
Atlantic herring have a fusiform body. Gill rakers in their mouths filter incoming water, trapping any zooplankton and phytoplankton.

Atlantic herring are in general fragile. They have large and delicate gill surfaces, and contact with foreign matter can strip away their large scales.

They have retreated from many estuaries worldwide due to excess water pollution although in some estuaries that have been cleaned up, herring have returned. The presence of their larvae indicates cleaner and more–oxygenated waters.

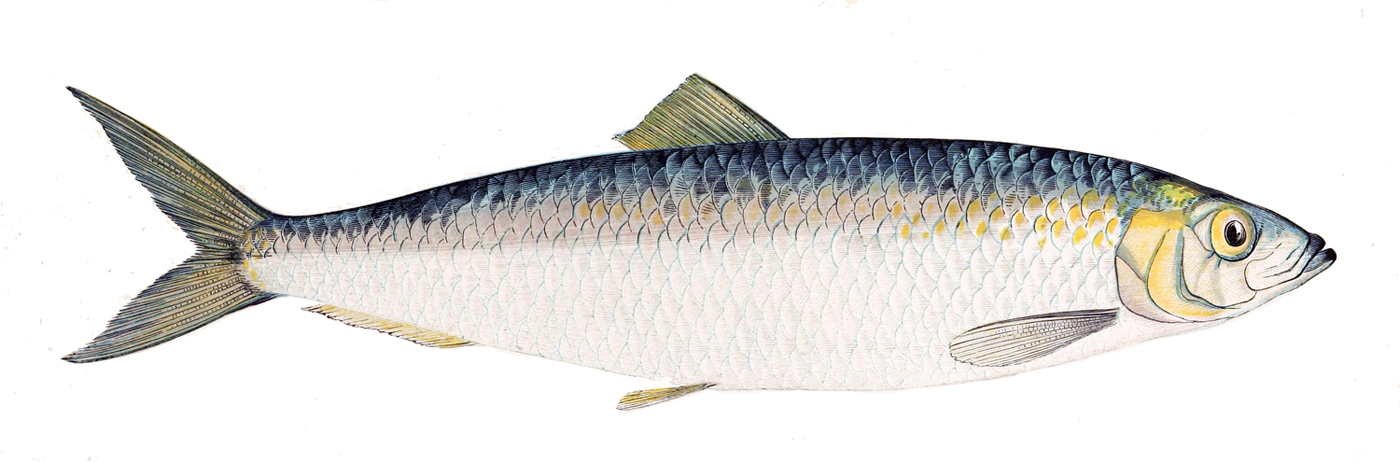

== Range and habitat ==
Atlantic herring can be found on both sides of the Atlantic Ocean. They range, shoaling and schooling, across North Atlantic waters such as the Gulf of Maine, the Gulf of St Lawrence, the Bay of Fundy, the Labrador Sea, the Davis Straits, the Beaufort Sea, the Denmark Strait, the Norwegian Sea, the North Sea, the Skagerrak, the English Channel, the Celtic Sea, the Irish Sea, the Bay of Biscay and Sea of the Hebrides. Although Atlantic herring are found in the northern waters surrounding the Arctic, they are not considered to be an Arctic species .

== Baltic herring ==
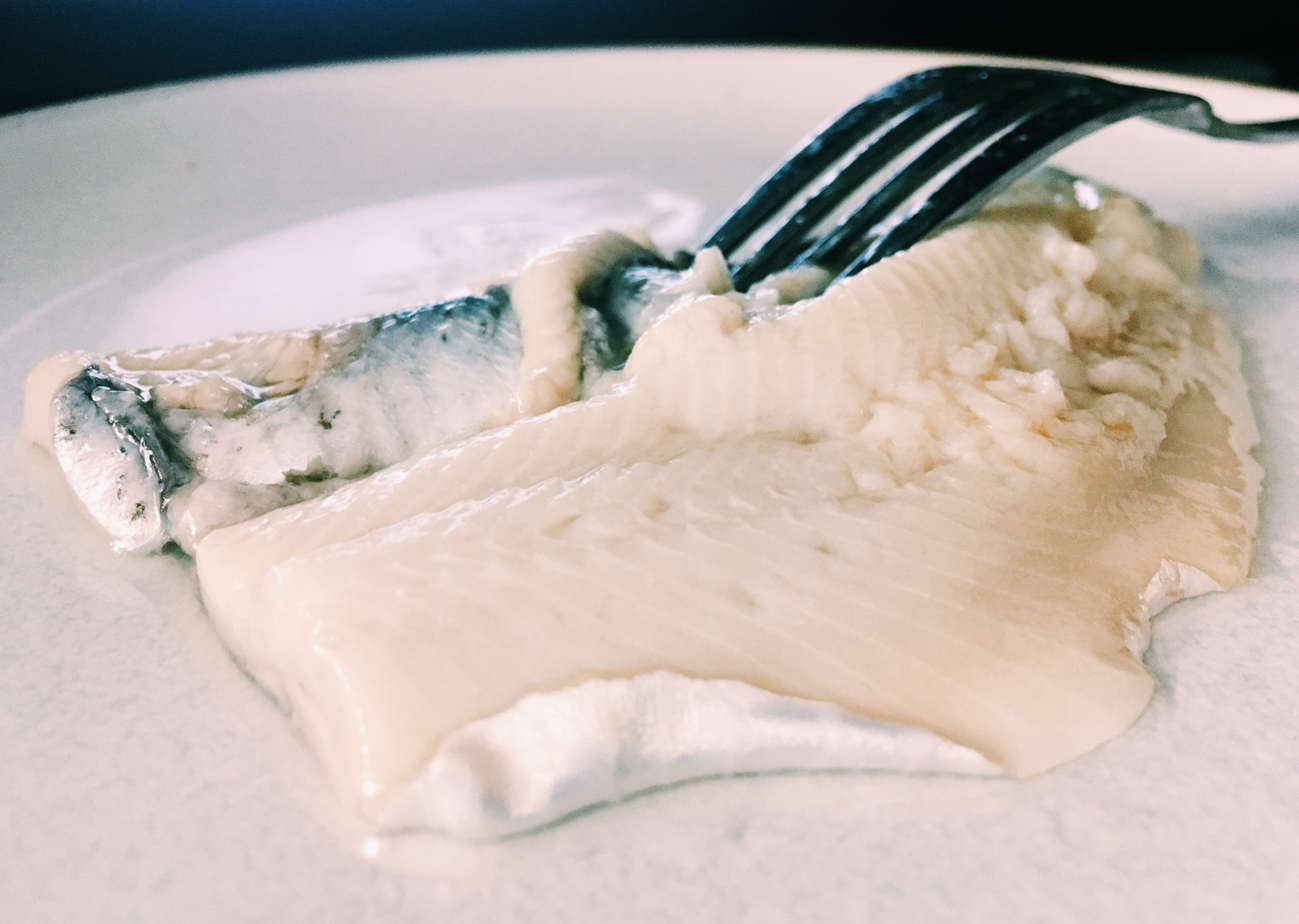
Baltic herring from Poland

The small-sized herring in the inner parts of the Baltic Sea, which is also less fatty than the true Atlantic herring (Clupea harengus harengus), is considered a distinct subspecies, "Baltic herring" (Clupea harengus membras), despite the lack of a distinctive genome. The Baltic herring has a specific name in many local languages (Swedish strömming, Finnish silakka, Estonian räim, silk, Livonian siļk, Russian салака, Polish śledź bałtycki, Latvian siļķe, Lithuanian silkė) and is popularly and in cuisine considered distinct from herring. For example, the Swedish dish surströmming is made from Baltic herring.

The Baltic herring was elected the national fish of Estonia in 2007. Helsinki is also known for its annual herring market since 1743.

Fisheries for Baltic herring have been at unsustainable levels since the Middle Ages. Around this time, the primary Baltic herring catch consisted of an autumn-spawning population. Cooling in the mid-16th century related to the Little Ice Age, combined with this overfishing, led to a dramatic loss of productivity in the population of autumn-spawning herring that rendered it nearly extinct. Due to this, the autumn-spawning herring were largely replaced by a spring-spawning population, which has since comprised most of the Baltic herring fisheries; this population is also at risk of overfishing.

== Life cycle ==
Herrings reach sexual maturity when they are 3 to 5 years old. The life expectancy once mature is 12 to 16 years. Atlantic herring may have different spawning components within a single stock which spawn during different seasons. They spawn in estuaries, coastal waters or in offshore banks. Fertilization is external, as in most other fish: the female releases between 20,000 and 40,000 eggs and the males simultaneously release masses of milt so that they mix freely in the sea. Once fertilized the 1 to 1.4 mm diameter eggs sink to the sea bed where their sticky surface adheres to gravel or weed. They mature in 1–3 weeks; in 14–19 °C (57–66 °F) water it takes 6–8 days, in 7.5 °C (45.5 °F) it takes 17 days. They will mature only if the water temperature stays below 19 °C (66 °F). The hatched larvae are 3 to 4 mm long and transparent except for the eyes which have some pigmentation.

== Population ==
Herrings are most seen in the North Atlantic Ocean, from the coast of South Carolina until Greenland, and from the Baltic Sea until Novaya Zemlya. In the North Sea people can distinguish four different main populations spawning in different periods:

- The Buchan-Shetland herrings spawn in August and September near the Scottish and Shetland coasts.
- On the Dogger Bank herrings spawn from August until October.
- The more southern population will spawn later, from November until January. These are the herrings from the Southern Bight of Downs.
- The Soused herring spawns every spring in the Baltic Sea, and travels via Skagerrak to the North Sea.

These four populations live outside of the spawn season interchangeably. In their spawn season, each population gathers together on their own spawn grounds.

In the past, there was another, fifth distinct population, the Zuiderzee herring, which spawned in the former Zuiderzee. This population disappeared when the Zuiderzee was drained by the Dutch as part of the larger Zuiderzee Works.

== Ecology ==
Herring-like fish are the most important fish group on the planet. They are also the most populous fish. They are the dominant converter of zooplankton into fish, consuming copepods, arrow worms chaetognatha, pelagic amphipods hyperiidae, mysids and krill in the pelagic zone. Conversely, they are a central prey item or forage fish for higher trophic levels. The reasons for this success are still enigmatic; one speculation attributes their dominance to the huge, extremely fast cruising schools they inhabit.

Orca, cod, dolphins, porpoises, sharks, rockfish, seabirds, whales, squid, sea lions, seals, tuna, salmon, and fishermen are among the predators of these fishes.

Herring's pelagic–prey includes copepods (e.g. Centropagidae, Calanus spp., Acartia spp., Temora spp.), amphipods like Hyperia spp., larval snails, diatoms by larvae below 20 millimetres (0.79 in), peridinians, molluscan larvae, fish eggs, krill like Meganyctiphanes norvegica, mysids, small fishes, menhaden larvae, pteropods, annelids, tintinnids by larvae below 45 millimetres (1.8 in), Haplosphaera, Pseudocalanus.

== Schooling ==
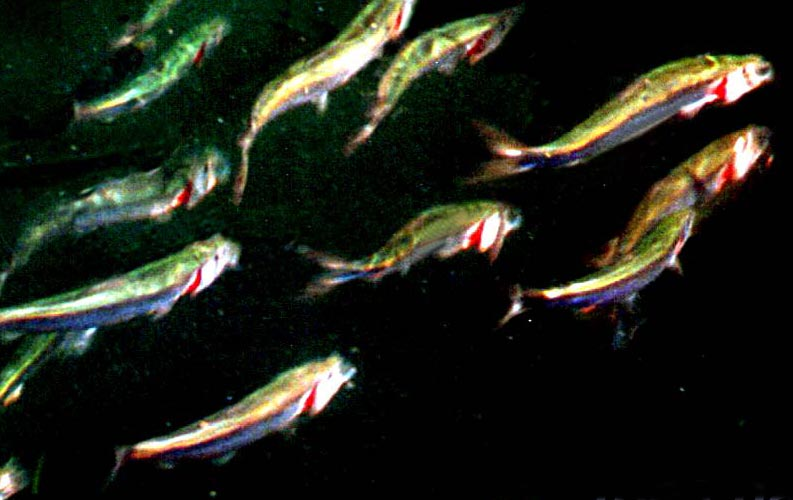
School of herring ram feeding close to the surface

Atlantic herring can school in immense numbers. Radakov estimated herring schools in the North Atlantic can occupy up to 4.8 cubic kilometres with fish densities between 0.5 and 1.0 fish/cubic metre, equivalent to several million fish in one school.

Herring are amongst the most spectacular schoolers ("obligate schoolers" under older terminology). They aggregate in groups that consist of thousands to hundreds of thousands or even millions of individuals. The schools traverse the open oceans.

Schools have a very precise spatial arrangement that allows the school to maintain a relatively constant cruising speed. Schools from an individual stock generally travel in a triangular pattern between their spawning grounds, e.g. Southern Norway, their feeding grounds (Iceland) and their nursery grounds (Northern Norway). Such wide triangular journeys are probably important because feeding herrings cannot distinguish their own offspring. They have excellent hearing, and a school can react very quickly to evade predators. Herring schools keep a certain distance from a moving scuba diver or a cruising predator like a killer whale, forming a vacuole which looks like a doughnut from a spotter plane. The phenomenon of schooling is far from understood, especially the implications on swimming and feeding-energetics. Many hypotheses have been put forward to explain the function of schooling, such as predator confusion, reduced risk of being found, better orientation, and synchronized hunting. However, schooling has disadvantages such as: oxygen- and food-depletion and excretion buildup in the breathing media. The school-array probably gives advantages in energy saving although this is a highly controversial and much debated field.

Schools of herring can on calm days sometimes be detected at the surface from more than a mile away by the little waves they form, or from a few meters at night when they trigger bioluminescence in surrounding plankton ("firing"). All underwater recordings show herring constantly cruising reaching speeds up to 108 centimetres (43 in) per second, and much higher escape speeds.

== Genetics ==
Atlantic herring populations show very little genome-wide genetic differentiation. Pairwise fixation index values range from 0.013 to 0.061 across 53 population samples. However, a few hundred loci show strong differentiation. These loci are associated with ecological adaptation to salinity, spawning season, and local light and temperature conditions. Candidate genes include PRLR, a prolactin receptor involved in osmoregulation, TSHR, which regulates seasonal reproduction in vertebrates, and RHO, a gene that has a missense change which adapts vision to the red-shifted light of the Baltic Sea. When researchers used 794 highly differentiated markers in a principal component analysis (PCA), they found seven main population groups. On the other hand, 169,394 undifferentiated markers did not separate the groups. This suggests that adaptive variation is most useful for understanding herring population structure rather than neutral variation. Four of the differentiated regions have been identified as large chromosomal inversions on chromosomes 6, 12, 17, and 23, and two of these were confirmed with long-read sequencing.

== Relationship with humans ==
=== Fisheries ===
Global capture production of Atlantic herring (Clupea harengus) in million tonnes from 1950 to 2022, as reported by the FAO

The Atlantic herring fishery is managed by multiple organizations that work together on the rules and regulations applying to herring. As of 2010 the species was not threatened by overfishing.

They are an important bait fish for recreational fishermen.

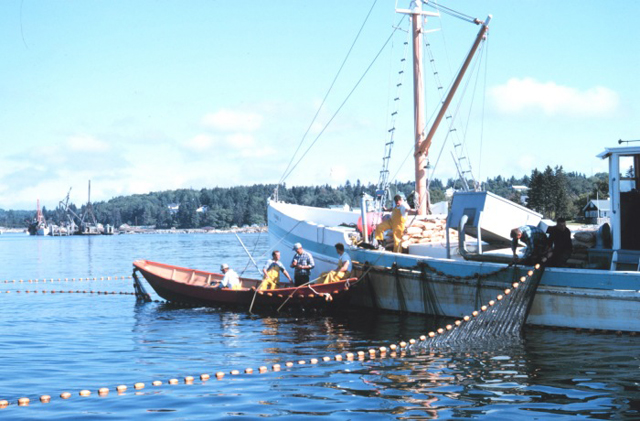
Purse seining for Atlantic herring

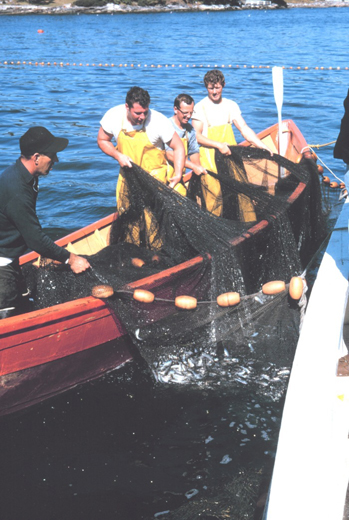
Harvesting with the purse seine

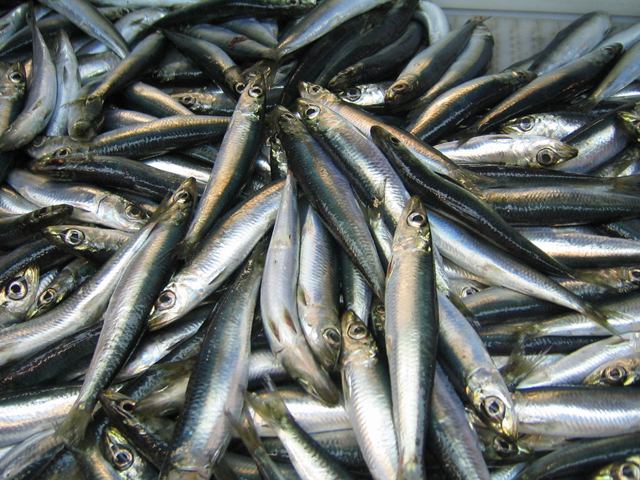
The catch

=== Aquariums ===
Because of their feeding habits, cruising desire, collective behavior, and fragility, they survive in very few aquaria worldwide despite their abundance in the ocean. Even facilities with proper practices and equipment leave them slim and slow compared to healthy wild schools.

== Other references ==
- "Clupea harengus". Integrated Taxonomic Information System.
- Kils, U., The ecoSCOPE and dynIMAGE: Microscale Tools for in situ Studies of Predator Prey Interactions Archived 21 February 2008 at the Wayback Machine. Arch Hydrobiol Beih 36:83-96;1992
- NOAA Fisheries (22 June 2023). "Species Directory: Atlantic Herring". NOAA Fisheries.
