= Clupea brouweri =

Clupea brouweri Temporal range: Miocene

Scientific classification
- Kingdom: Animalia
- Phylum: Chordata
- Class: Actinopterygii
- Division: Teleostei
- Order: Clupeiformes
- Family: Clupeidae
- Genus: Clupea
- Species: †C. brouweri

Binomial name
- †Clupea brouweri de Beaufort, 1926

Species of dorosomatid

Clupea brouweri is a species of dorosomatid that lived in Indonesia during the Miocene epoch. They are one of the most common species in Tonasa Formation as there are 55 specimens that been labeled as this species.

C. brouweri ranges from 7–15 cm in length, although there are no complete specimens that have been found; especially for the head parts. From what is known so far, C. brouweri have very similar head to Sardinella fimbriata (written as "C. fimbriata" in the original description; Clupea genus nowadays is often regarded as a junior synonym of Sardinella). The dorsal fin have 15 rays and located in the 27 vertebrate counted from the posterior. The numerous fossils and their preservation condition show that C. brouweri almost certainly lived in shoal like their modern relatives. Judging by some slabs have one fish lay on another one or one slab containing two fishes, de Beaufort predicted that the shoal got stranded in the low tide.
