= Protohimantura =

Protohimantura Temporal range: Miocene

Scientific classification
- Kingdom: Animalia
- Phylum: Chordata
- Class: Chondrichthyes
- Subclass: Elasmobranchii
- Order: Myliobatiformes
- Family: Dasyatidae
- Genus: †Protohimantura; Marramà, Klug, de Vos & Kriwet, 2018
- Species: †P. vorstmani

Binomial name
- †Protohimantura vorstmani (de Beaufort, 1926)

Synonyms
- Trygon vorstmani de Beaufort, 1926

Extinct genus of fishes

Protohimantura is a genus of whipray that lived in Indonesia during Miocene epoch. It is known from one specimen consisting its front body which is a rarity compared to other Southeast Asian ray fossils that usually only consist of tooth. The fossil come from Pattunuang Asue which itself is a part of Tonasa Formation (South Sulawesi) that mainly known for marine fish fossils.

From the preserved part, Protohimantura can be inferred as an average-sized whipray that have 50-60 cm total length. It mostly differed from its modern relatives by the eye, neurocranial, and body radials proportion. Its closest living relatives are whipray from Himantura genera. They form a clade that is sister to all other dasyatids.
