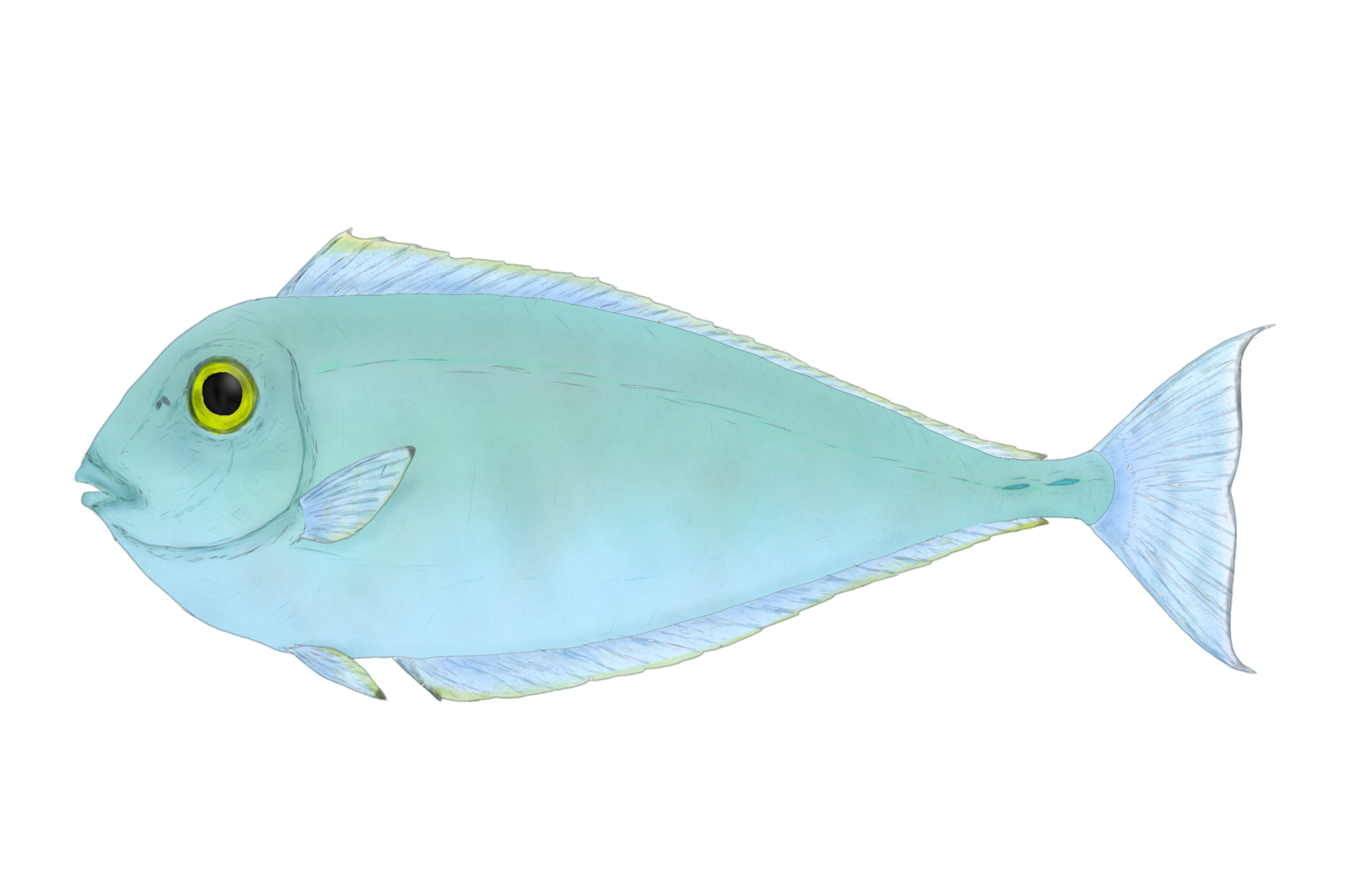

Scientific classification
- Kingdom: Animalia
- Phylum: Chordata
- Class: Actinopterygii
- Division: Teleostei
- Order: Acanthuriformes
- Family: Acanthuridae
- Subfamily: Nasinae
- Genus: †Marosichthys; Whitley, 1951
- Species: †M. huismani

Binomial name
- †Marosichthys huismani (de Beaufort, 1926)

Synonyms
- Marosia huismani de Beaufort, 1926

= Marosichthys =

Marosichthys Temporal range: Early Miocene

Genus of fishes

Marosichthys is an extinct genus of surgeonfish that lived in South Sulawesi, Indonesia during Miocene. The only known fossil specimen consists of the anterior half of the body without the anal fin and caudal vertebrae. The length of the body from the snout to the middle of the seventh centrum is 60 mm and its depth between the spiny dorsal-fin base and the pelvic fin is 49 mm. It is known from the Early Miocene-aged Tonasa Formation.

When first described by de Beaufort (1926), Marosichthys was said to be a type of tetraodontiform fish. Only by later examination that it was found Marosichthys is a genus of surgeonfish specifically closely related to Naso genus. A unique characteristic of this genus is that two basal pterygiophores of the spiny dorsal fin are situated in front of the neural spine of the first vertebrae.

A 2026 study identified Marosichthys as potentially the sister genus to Arambourgthurus, an extinct pelagic surgeonfish from the mid-to-late Eocene-aged Pabdeh Formation of Iran. Both of these genera were identified as stem-group Nasinae.
