= Cybium intermedium =

Cybium intermedium Temporal range: Miocene

Scientific classification
- Kingdom: Animalia
- Phylum: Chordata
- Class: Actinopterygii
- Division: Teleostei
- Order: Scombriformes
- Family: Scombridae
- Genus: Cybium
- Species: C. intermedium

Binomial name
- Cybium intermedium de Beaufort, 1926

Extinct species of fish

Cybium intermedium was a species of scombriform that lived in South Sulawesi during the Miocene epoch. It is known from several specimens which mostly consist of the front parts of the fish. It can be inferred from the preserved parts that C. intermedium is a predatory fish like extant mackerels.

== Description ==
They have a very powerful lower jaw bone and strong laterally compressed canines on both jaws. The area near the gill covering (operculum) are covered by scales that are more apparent compared to extant species that usually have a scaless-looking head.The pectoral fin rays are arranged in fan-like fashion. The first dorsal fin has around 15 rays. There are no surviving specimens that show the complete form of the tail.

== Taxonomy ==
Beaufort wrote there are probably more than one species among the seven specimens that referred as Cybium species from Tonasa Formation. But as for now, they are regarded as same species and thought to be an intermediate form between Cybium (now usually regarded as junior synonym to Scomberomorus) and Scomber. Hence the taxa was given "intermedium" for its species name.
