= Caranx baltruschi =

Caranx baltruschi Temporal range: Miocene
- Reconstruction of C. baltruschi (bottom) and C. femeri

Scientific classification
- Kingdom: Animalia
- Phylum: Chordata
- Class: Actinopterygii
- Division: Teleostei
- Order: Carangiformes
- Suborder: Carangoidei
- Family: Carangidae
- Genus: Caranx
- Species: †C. baltruschi

Binomial name
- †Caranx baltruschi de Beaufort, 1926

Extinct species of fish

Caranx baltruschi is species of prehistoric marine fish that lived in South Sulawesi during the Miocene epoch. Its fossil remain, which consist of single half part of the fish without the head, was found in Tonasa Formation. It is one of two Caranx species that have been found there with the other being C. femeri. One of the main difference between the two is C. baltruschi have a much more elongated body compared to C. femeri. It was named in honour of engineer Th. Baltrusch.
