= Chelmon fossilis =

Chelmon fossilis Temporal range: Miocene

Scientific classification
- Kingdom: Animalia
- Phylum: Chordata
- Class: Actinopterygii
- Division: Teleostei
- Order: Acanthuriformes
- Family: Chaetodontidae
- Genus: Chelmon
- Species: †C. fossilis

Binomial name
- †Chelmon fossilis de Beaufort, 1926

Species of butterflyfish

Chelmon fossilis is a species of butterflyfish that lived during the Miocene epoch in South Sulawesi, Indonesia. Its fossil, which consist of the anterior part of the fish, was found in the Tonasa Formation that produce numerous fossil marine fishes. From the description, C. fossilis has an overall lower body profile than extant Chelmon species and is said to resemble Chelmonops. Its eyes are large, while the jaws is long and forming a beak like structure as seen in Chelmon species. Further resemblance to Chelmon genera can be observed on the pelvic and shoulder girdles. The original describer (de Beaufort, 1926) misspelled the genus as "Chelmon" via lapsus calami. Some researchers also doubt its placement as Chelmon species.
