= Chelmon muelleri =

Conservation status
- Least Concern (IUCN 3.1)

Scientific classification
- Kingdom: Animalia
- Phylum: Chordata
- Class: Actinopterygii
- Order: Acanthuriformes
- Family: Chaetodontidae
- Genus: Chelmon
- Species: C. muelleri

Binomial name
- Chelmon muelleri Klunzinger, 1879

Species of fish

Chelmon muelleri, the blackfin coralfish or Muller's coralfish, is a species of marine ray-finned fish, a butterflyfish in the family Chaetodontidae. It is a reef fish which is endemic to Australia.

== Description ==
Chelmon muelleri is a long-snouted species of butterflyfish which has a silvery white background colour to the body, marked with four wide brown vertical bars and a large black ocellus at the base of the posterior dorsal fin. The dorsal fin contains 9-10 spines and 26-30 soft rays while the anal fin has 3 spines and 18-21 soft rays. This species attains a total length of 20.5 centimetres (8.1 in).

== Distribution ==
Chelmon muelleri is endemic to Australia from the Kimberley Island groups in Western Australia to the southern Great Barrier Reef in Queensland.

== Habitat and biology ==
Chelmon muelleri is found on shallow coastal reefs with very little cover of live coral, where the seabed consists of mud or silt or there is extensive cover of algae. It also occurs in estuaries. It can be found as deep as 20 metres (66 ft). The adult fish are normally observed in pairs, although juveniles are solitary. It is a carnivorous species which has a diet consisting of worms, clams, tunicates, and crustaceans.

== Taxonomy and etymology ==
Chelmon muelleri was first formally described in 1879 by the German zoologist Carl Benjamin Klunzinger (1834-1914) with the type locality given as Port Denison in Queensland. The specific name honours the German physician, geographer and botanist Ferdinand von Mueller (1825-1896).

== Utilisation ==
Chelmon muelleri rarely appears in the aquarium trade and when it does it commands high prices.
