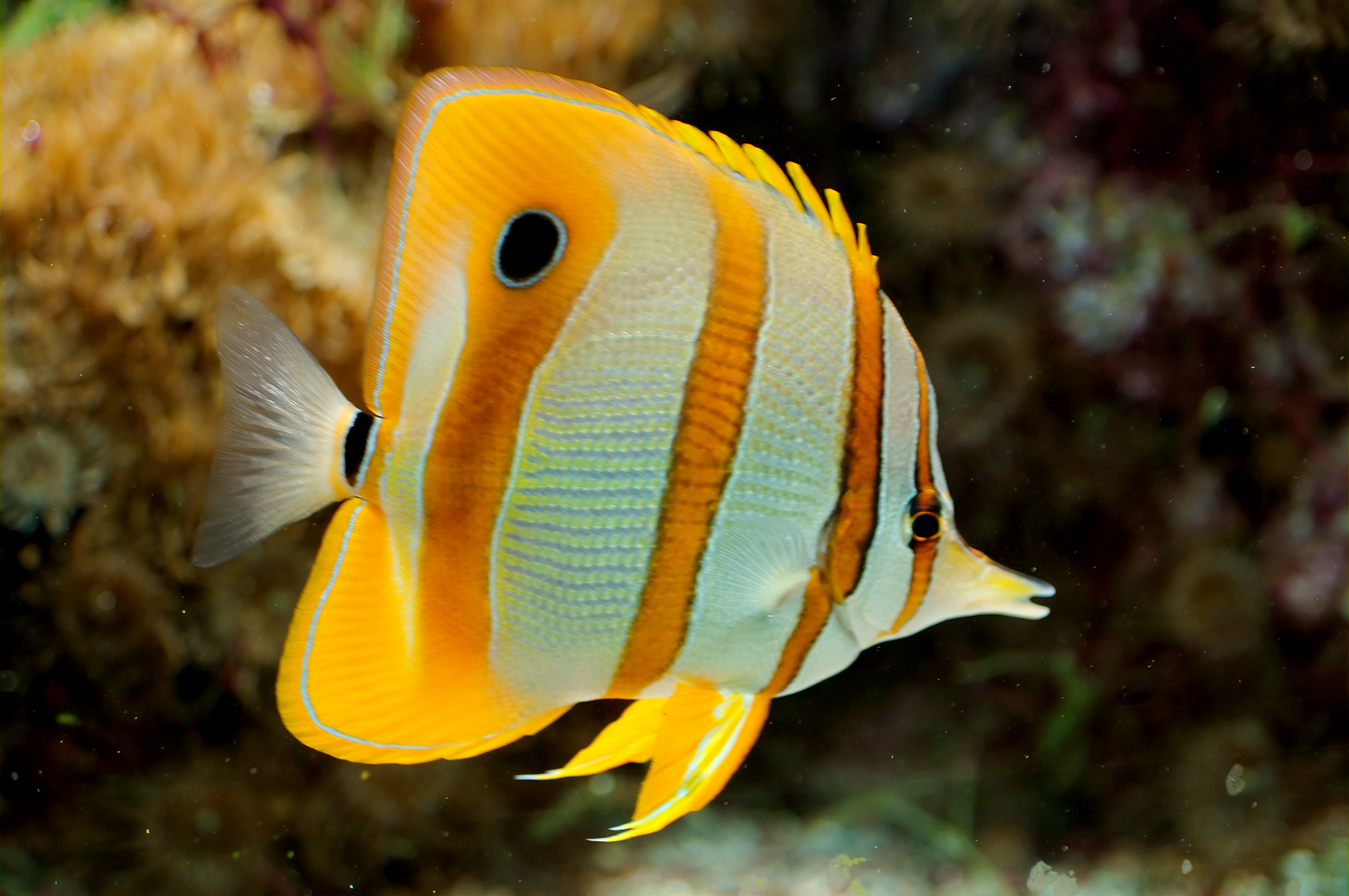
- Copperband butterflyfish (C. rostratus)

Scientific classification
- Kingdom: Animalia
- Phylum: Chordata
- Class: Actinopterygii
- Order: Acanthuriformes
- Family: Chaetodontidae
- Genus: Chelmon; Cloquet, 1817

Type species
- Chelmon rostratus Linnaeus, 1758

= Chelmon =

Chelmon Temporal range: Miocene–present

Genus of fishes

Chelmon is a genus of marine ray-finned fish in the family Chaetodontidae, the butterflyfishes. They are tropical species native to the western Pacific Ocean.

== Species ==
There are currently three recognized species in this genus:

- Chelmon marginalis J. Richardson, 1842 – margined coralfish
- Chelmon muelleri Klunzinger, 1880 – blackfin coralfish
- Chelmon rostratus (Linnaeus, 1758) – copperband butterflyfish

The only known potential fossil of this genus is Chelmon fossilis de Beaufort, 1926 from the Miocene of Sulawesi, Indonesia. However, its placement within this genus is in doubt, although it is most likely a chaetodontid.
