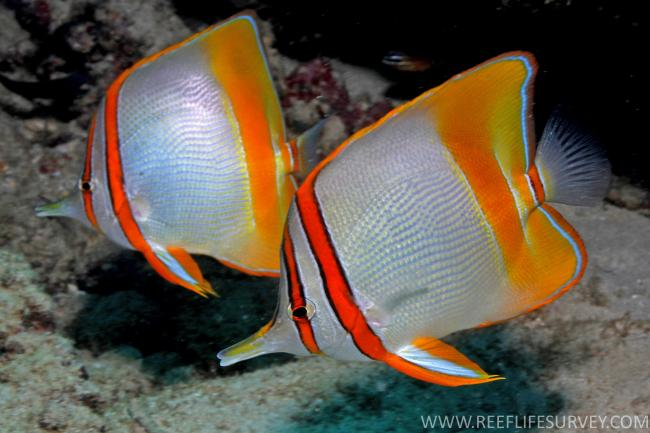

Conservation status
- Least Concern (IUCN 3.1)

Scientific classification
- Kingdom: Animalia
- Phylum: Chordata
- Class: Actinopterygii
- Order: Acanthuriformes
- Family: Chaetodontidae
- Genus: Chelmon
- Species: C. marginalis

Binomial name
- Chelmon marginalis J. Richardson, 1846

Synonyms
- Chelmon rostratus marginalis (Richardson, 1842); Chelmo tricinctus Castelnau, 1875

= Chelmon marginalis =

Species of fish

Chelmon marginalis, the margined coralfish or Western beaked butterflyfish, is a species of marine ray-finned fish, a butterflyfish in the family Chaetodontidae. It is a reef fish which is endemic to Australia.

== Description ==
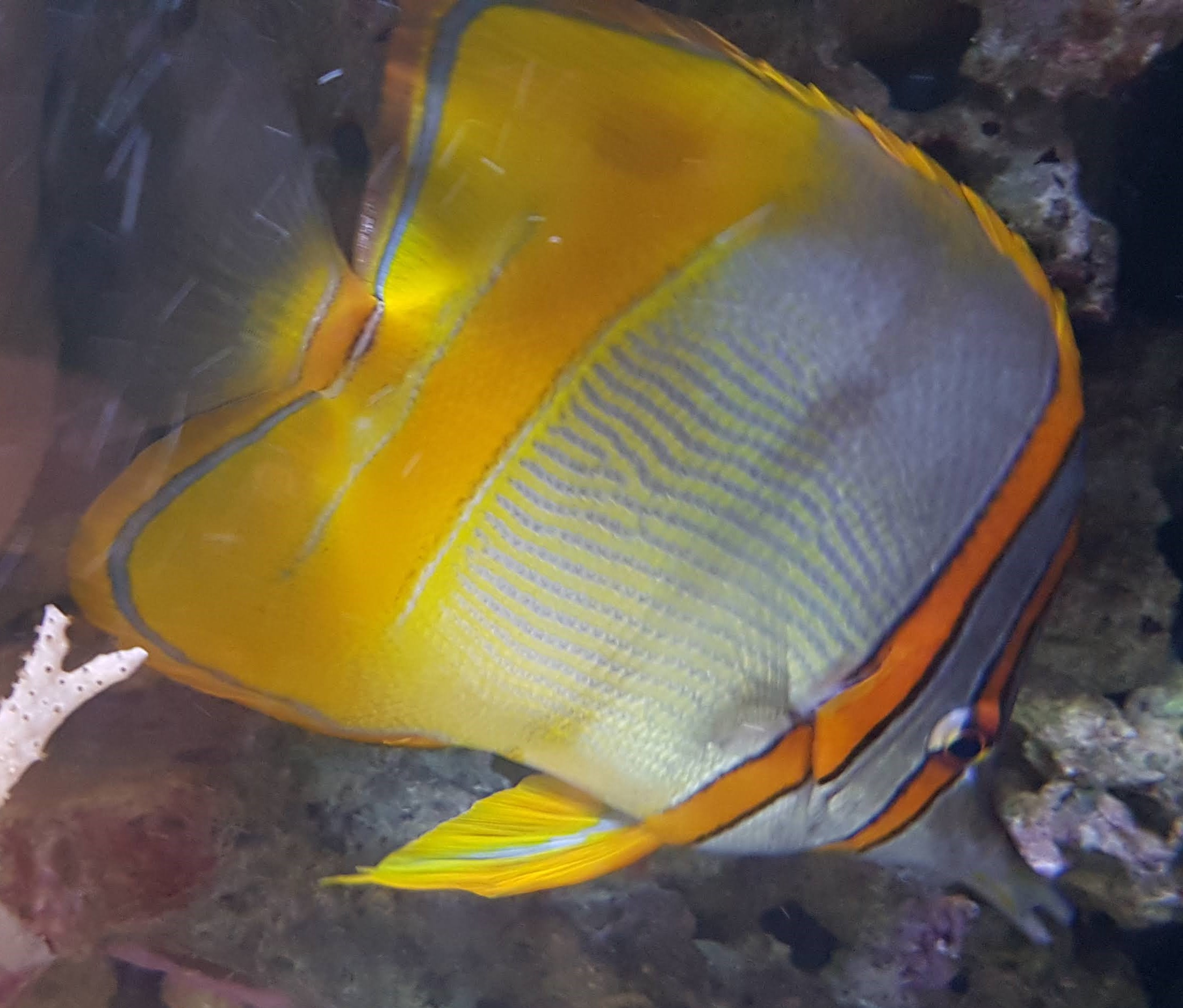
Margined coralfish at Berlin Aquarium

Chelmon marginalis is silvery white in colour with two slender orange bars on the head and front part of the body, and a wide yellowish or yellowish-orange band close to the caudal peduncle. The adults do not have a false eyespot or ocellus on their dorsal fin. The juveniles have a bar towards the tail and an ocellus on the dorsal fin, these fade and eventually disappear as the fish matures. The dorsal fin contains 9-10 spines and 29-33 soft rays while the anal fin has 3 spines and 21-22 soft rays. This species attains a maximum total length of 18 centimetres (7.1 in).

== Distribution ==
Chelmon marginalis is endemic to Australia where it is found from the Houtman Abrolhos in Western Australia around the coasts of northern Australia to the northern Great Barrier Reef and the reefs in the Coral Sea off Queensland.

== Habitat and biology ==
Chelmon marginalis is found largely on coastal coral and rocky reefs, it can be found on the outer reef slopes, drop off and around islands close to the shore as well. It is a carnivorous species which preys on benthic invertebrates such as crabs, shrimps and polychaetes. This is normally a solitary species which forms pairs to breed, breeding is oviparous.

== Utilisation ==
Chelmon marginalis is rarely exported and is thus uncommon in the aquarium trade.

== Taxonomy ==
Chelmon marginalis was first formally described in 1842 by the Scottish naval surgeon, arctic explorer and naturalist Sir John Richardson (1787-1865) with the type locality given as Port Essington in the Northern Territory.

== Notes ==
- Froese, Rainer; Pauly, Daniel (eds.). "Chelmon marginalis". FishBase. Jan 2007 version.
