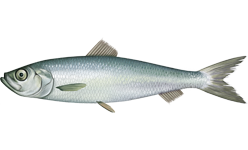
- Atlantic herring (Clupea harengus)

Scientific classification
- Kingdom: Animalia
- Phylum: Chordata
- Class: Actinopterygii
- Division: Teleostei
- Order: Clupeiformes
- Family: Clupeidae
- Genus: Clupea; Linnaeus, 1758

Type species
- Clupea harengus Linnaeus, 1758

Species
- see text

Synonyms
- Harengus Garsault, 1764; Rogenia Valenciennes, 1847

= Clupea =

Clupea Temporal range: 16–0 Ma Middle Miocene to Present

Genus of fishes

Clupea is a genus of planktivorous bony fish belonging to the family Clupeidae, commonly known as herrings. They are found in the shallow, temperate waters of the North Pacific and the North Atlantic oceans, including the Baltic Sea. Two main species of Clupea are currently recognized: the Atlantic herring (Clupea harengus) and the Pacific herring (Clupea pallasii), which have each been divided into subspecies. Herrings are forage fish moving in vast schools, coming in spring to the shores of Europe and America, where they form important commercial fisheries.

== Morphology ==
The species of Clupea belong to the larger family Clupeidae (herrings, shads, sardines, menhadens), which comprises some 200 species that share similar features. They are silvery-colored fish that have a single dorsal fin, which is soft, without spines. They have no lateral line and have a protruding lower jaw. Their size varies between subspecies: the Baltic herring (Clupea harengus membras) is small, 14 to 18 centimeters; the proper Atlantic herring (C. h. harengus) can grow to about 45.72 cm (18.00 in) and weigh up 680 g (1.50 lb); and Pacific herring grow to about 38 cm (15 in).

== Species ==
Clupea species
| Common name | Scientific name | Maximum length | Common length | Maximum weight | Maximum age | Trophic level | Fish Base | FAO | ITIS | IUCN status |
|---|---|---|---|---|---|---|---|---|---|---|
| Atlantic herring | Clupea harengus Linnaeus, 1758 | 45.0 cm | 30.0 cm | 1.1 kg | 22 years | 3.23 | | | | Least concern |
| Atlantic herring | C. h. harengus Linnaeus, 1758 | | | | | | | | | |
| Baltic herring | C. h. membras Valenciennes, 1847 | | | | | | | | | |
| Pacific herring | Clupea pallasii Valenciennes, 1847 | 46.0 cm | 25.0 cm | | 19 years | 3.15 | | | | Not assessed |
| Pacific herring | C. p. pallasii Valenciennes, 1847 | 46.0 cm | 25.0 cm | | | | | | - | |
| White Sea herring | C. p. marisalbi L. S. Berg, 1923 | 34.0 cm | | | | | | | - | |
| Chosa herring | C. p. suworowi Rabinerson, 1927 | 31.5 cm | | | | | | | - | |

=== Fossil species ===
- †Clupea aenemtensis Sytchevskaya, 1985 (Miocene of Kamchatka, Russia)
- †Clupea brouweri de Beaufort, 1926
- †Clupea hanishinaensis Yabumoto & Nazarkin, 2020 (=C. macrocephala Yabumoto & Nazarkin, 2018) (Middle Miocene of Japan)
- ?†Clupea tiejei David, 1943 (Late Miocene of California)

Many other fossil species have been previously placed into this genus, due to it being a former wastebasket taxon for herring-like fossil fish. As the only known reliable fossils of this genus are from the Miocene of the Pacific Ocean, it has been suggested that Clupea originated in the Pacific Ocean in the Miocene, with the Pacific herring descending from this ancestral source population. Some Clupea then dispersed to the Atlantic Ocean via the Arctic Ocean when the Bering Strait opened for the first time about 5 million years ago, during the Early Pliocene, with these becoming the ancestors of the Atlantic herring.

== Ecology ==
See Atlantic herring for videos of juvenile herring feeding by catching copepods.

Video loop of a school of Atlantic herring migrating to their spawning grounds in the Baltic Sea

Predators of herring include humans, seabirds, dolphins, porpoises, striped bass, seals, sea lions, whales, sharks, dog fish, tuna, cod, salmon, and halibut. Other large fish also feed on adult herring.

Young herring feed on phytoplankton and as they mature they start to consume larger organisms. Adult herring feed on zooplankton, tiny animals that are found in oceanic surface waters, and small fish and fish larvae. Copepods and other tiny crustaceans are the most common zooplankton eaten by herring. During daylight herring stay in the safety of deep water, feeding at the surface only at night when there is less chance of being seen by predators. They swim along with their mouths open, filtering the plankton from the water as it passes through their gills.

== Fisheries ==
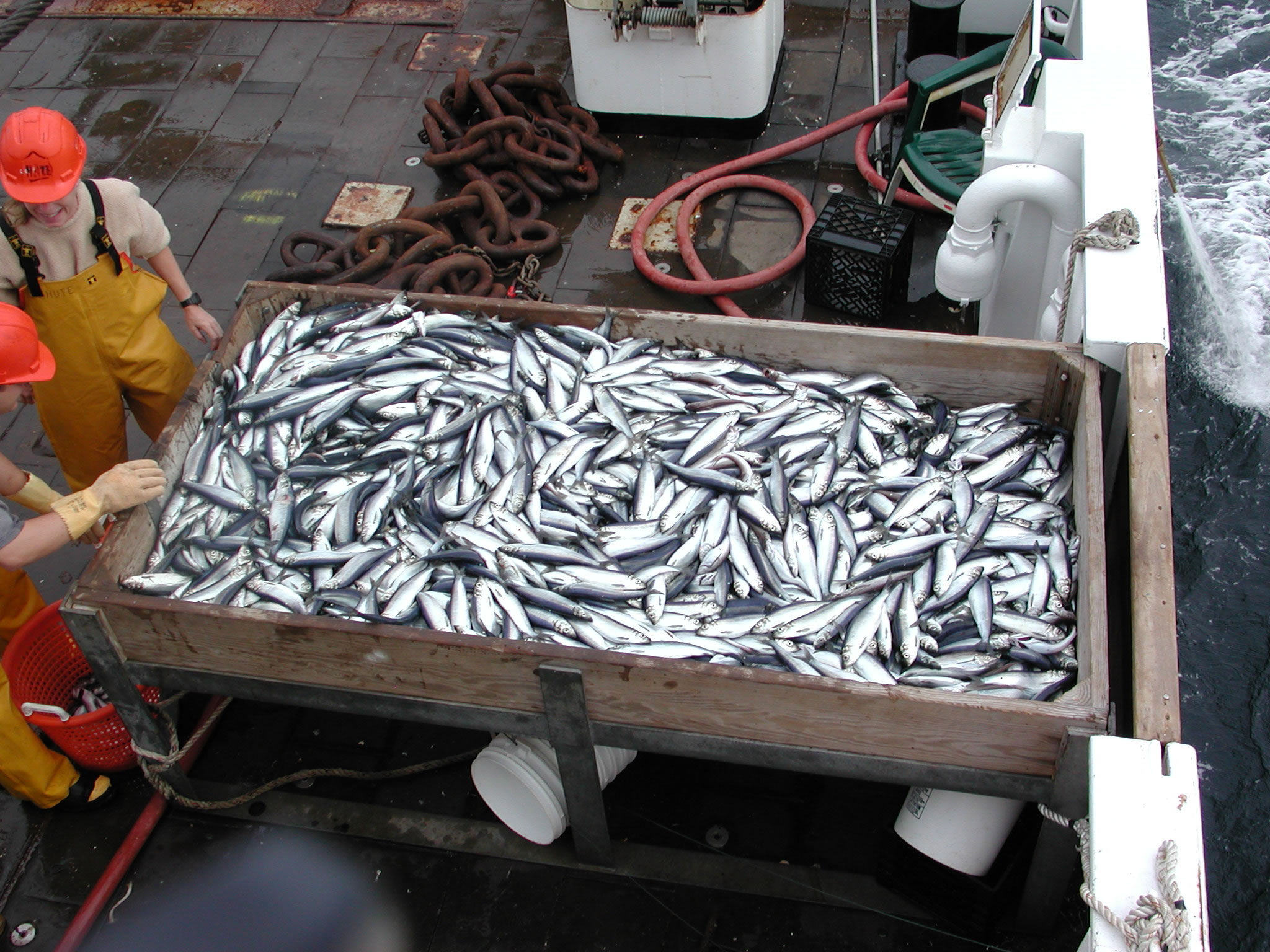
Commercial herring catch

Adult herring are harvested for their meat and eggs, and they are often used as baitfish. The trade in herring is an important sector of many national economies. In Europe the fish has been called the "silver of the sea", and its trade has been so significant to many countries that it has been regarded as the most commercially important fishery in history. Environmental Defense have suggested that the Atlantic herring (Clupea harengus) fishery is one of the more environmentally responsible fisheries.

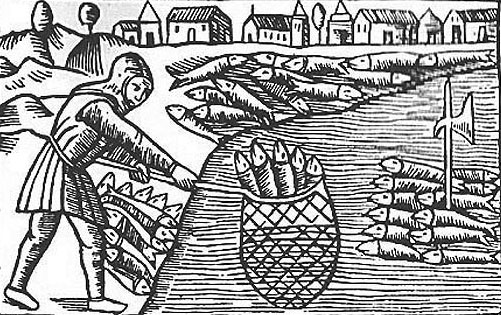
Medieval herring fishing in Scania, 1555

== Sources ==
- Froese, Rainer; Pauly, Daniel (eds.). "Species in genus Clupea". FishBase. January 2006 version.
- O'Clair, Rita M. and O'Clair, Charles E., "Pacific herring," Southeast Alaska's Rocky Shores: Animals. pg. 343–346. Plant Press: Auke Bay, Alaska (1998). ISBN 0-9664245-0-6
