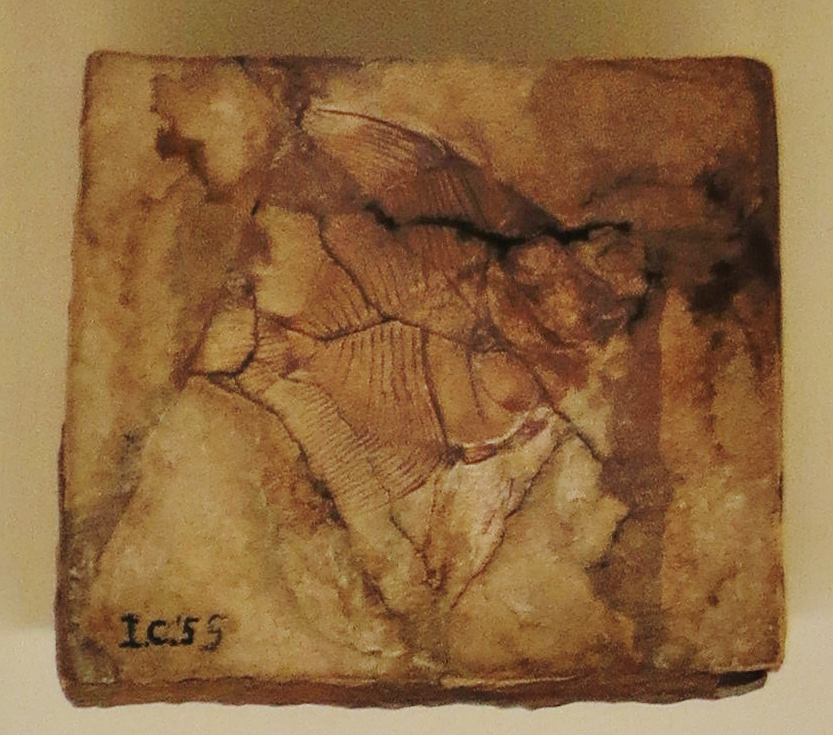
- Fossil specimen, Museo di Storia Naturale di Verona

Scientific classification
- Kingdom: Animalia
- Phylum: Chordata
- Class: Actinopterygii
- Order: Acanthuriformes
- Family: Zanclidae
- Genus: †Eozanclus; Blot & Voruz, 1975
- Species: †E. brevirostris

Binomial name
- †Eozanclus brevirostris (Agassiz, 1835)

Synonyms
- Zanclus brevirostris Agassiz, 1835

= Eozanclus =

Eozanclus Temporal range: late Ypresian

Extinct genus of ray-finned fishes

Eozanclus ("dawn Zanclus") is an extinct genus of marine ray-finned fish, closely related to the modern Moorish idol, that lived during Eocene. It contains a single species, E. brevirostris that lived during the late Ypresian epoch in what is now Monte Bolca, northern Italy. It is one of two known fossil Moorish idols from Monte Bolca alongside Angiolinia. It differs from its living relative by having a much shorter snout.

It was first erroneously figured by Volta (1796) as a specimen of the Moorish idol itself (then known as Chaetodon canescens). It was later officially described by Agassiz (1835) as its own species within Zanclus, before being moved to its own genus in 1975.

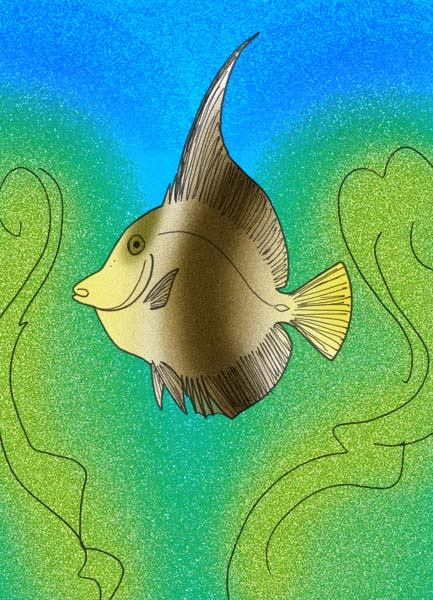
Life restoration
