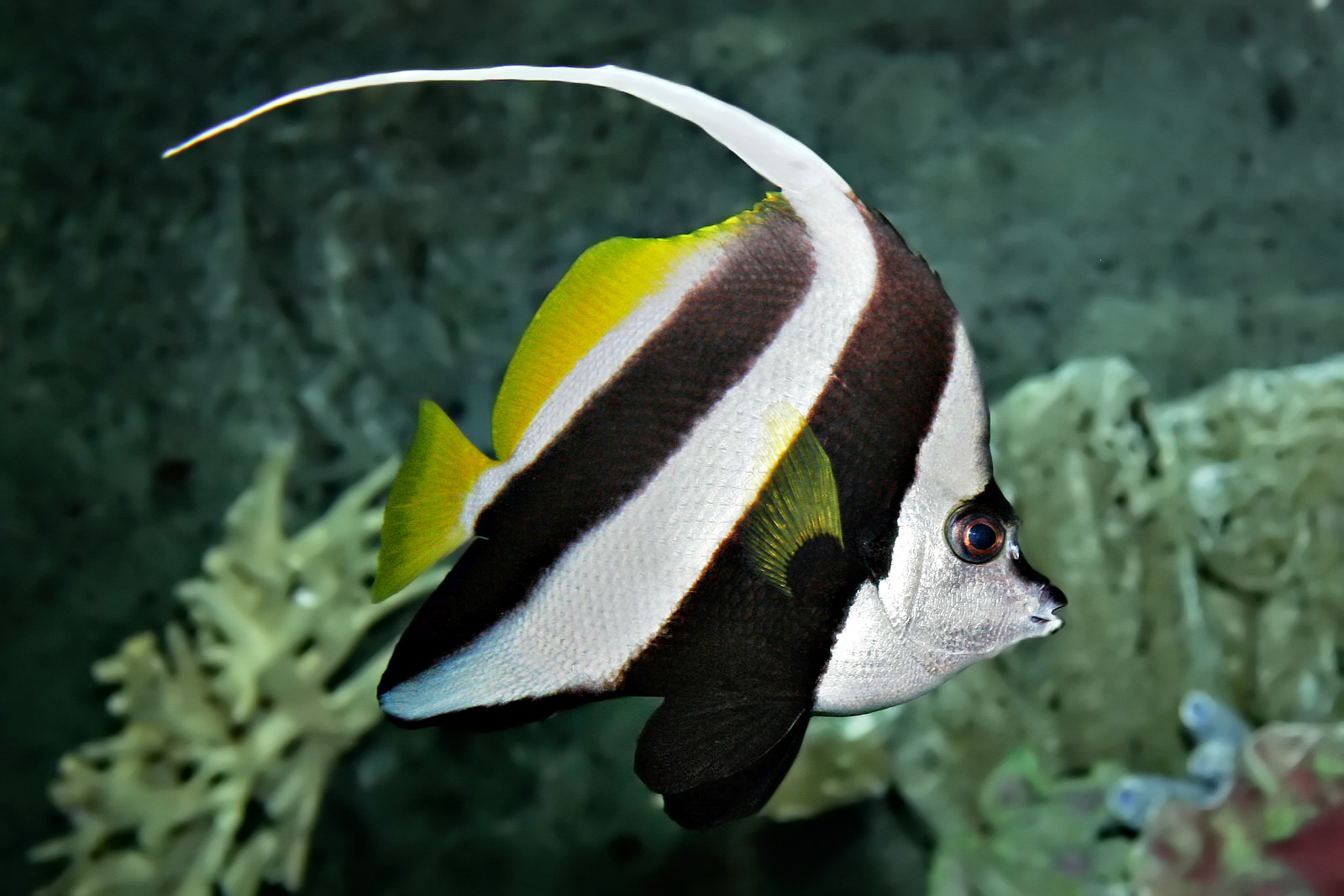

Conservation status
- Least Concern (IUCN 3.1) (Globally)

- Vulnerable (IUCN 3.1) (Persian Gulf)

Scientific classification
- Kingdom: Animalia
- Phylum: Chordata
- Class: Actinopterygii
- Division: Teleostei
- Order: Acanthuriformes
- Family: Chaetodontidae
- Genus: Heniochus
- Species: H. acuminatus

Binomial name
- Heniochus acuminatus (Linnaeus, 1758)

Synonyms
- Chaetodon acuminatus Linnaeus, 1758; Chaetodon macrolepidotus Linnaeus, 1758; Heniochus macrolepidotus (Linnaeus, 1758); Taurichthys macrolepidotus (Linnaeus, 1758); Chaetodon bifasciatus Shaw, 1803; Chaetodon mycteryzans Gronow, 1854

= Pennant coralfish =

Species of fish

The pennant coralfish (Heniochus acuminatus), also known as the longfin bannerfish, reef bannerfish or coachman, is a species of fish of the family Chaetodontidae, native to the Indo-Pacific area.

== Description ==
The pennant coralfish is a small-sized fish that can reach a maximum length of 25 cm. However, the average size generally observed in the nature oscillates around 15 cm.

Its body is compressed laterally, the first rays of its dorsal fin stretch in a long white filament. The background color of its body is white with two large black diagonal bands. Beyond the second black stripe, the dorsal and the caudal fins are yellow. The pectoral fins are also yellow. The head is white, the eyes are black and linked together by a black band. The snout, spotted with black, is a bit stretched with a small terminal protractile (it can be extend) mouth.

The juvenile does not have yet after the second black stripe any white area like adults.

The pennant coralfish can easily be confused with the quite similar schooling bannerfish, (Heniochus diphreutes ). The main and visible differences are: a longer snout for the reef bannerfish and spots on its snout are darker, the pelvic fin of the reef bannerfish is longer and has a rounded end unlike the schooling bannerfish which has a smaller and more angular end.

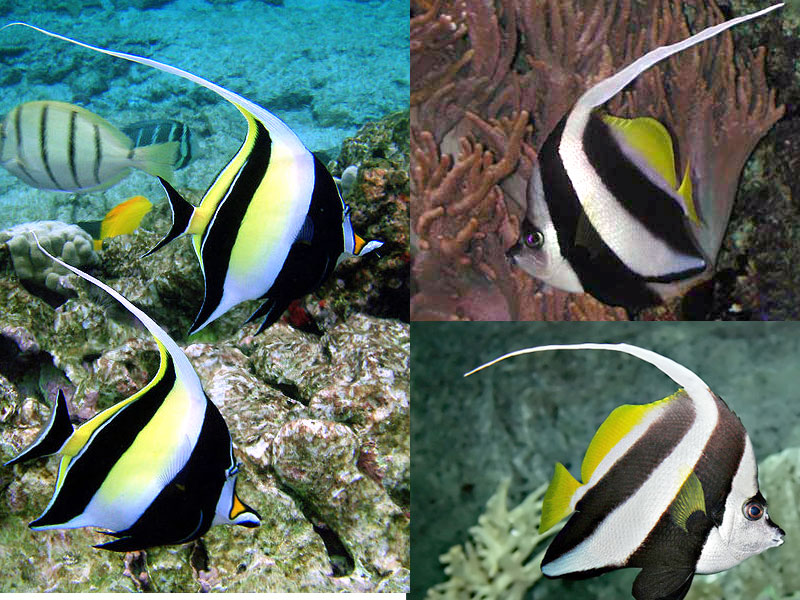
A comparison of the three similar species: the moorish idol (left), schooling bannerfish (top), and pennant coralfish (bottom)

== Distribution and habitat ==
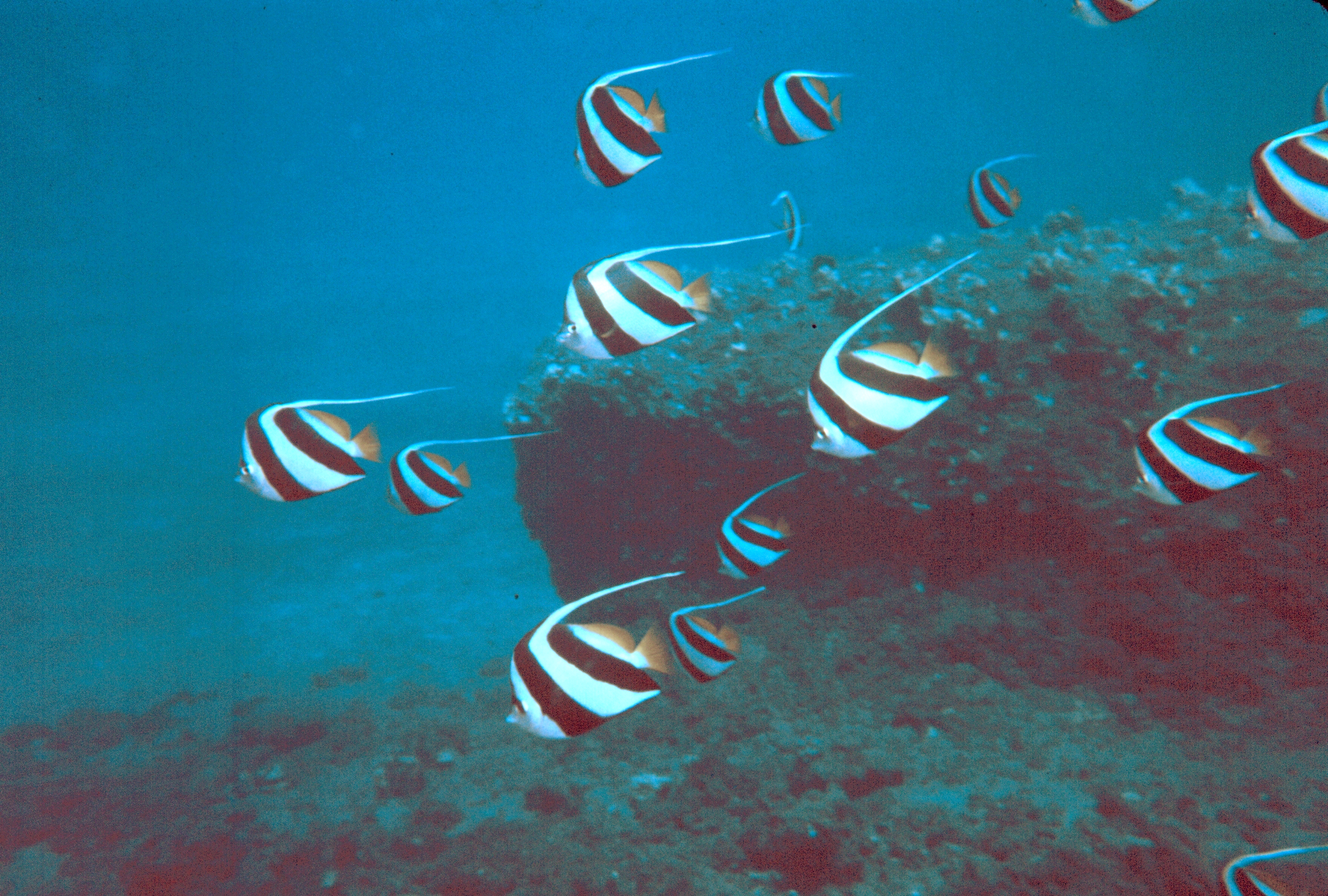
A school outside an artificial reef

The pennant coralfish is widespread throughout the tropical and subtropical waters of the Indo-Pacific from the eastern coast of Africa, Red Sea included, to Polynesia and from south Japan to the south of the Great Barrier Reef.

The reef bannerfish likes relatively deep waters from protected lagoon, channels or outer reef slopes from 15 to 75 m (49 to 246 ft) deep.

== Biology ==
The pennant coralfish lives in pairs and feeds on zooplankton in the water column, coral polyps and occasionally benthic invertebrates. Juveniles are solitary and can feed by cleaning other fishes.

== Conservation status ==
The species is globally assessed as Least concern by the IUCN, however some local populations are in decline. Much like many other reef fish, the pennant coral fish is threatened in the Persian Gulf due to the fact several coral reefs have been damaged and severely fragmented with no contiguous coral assemblages.

== Taxonomy ==
The pennant coralfish was first formally described as Chaetodon acuminatus in 1758 by Linnaeus in the 10th edition of Systema Natura. Linnaeus also described a species he named Chaetodon macrolepidotus which Georges Cuvier used as the type species for the genus Heniochus and which has since come to be regarded as a synonym of H. acuminatus.
