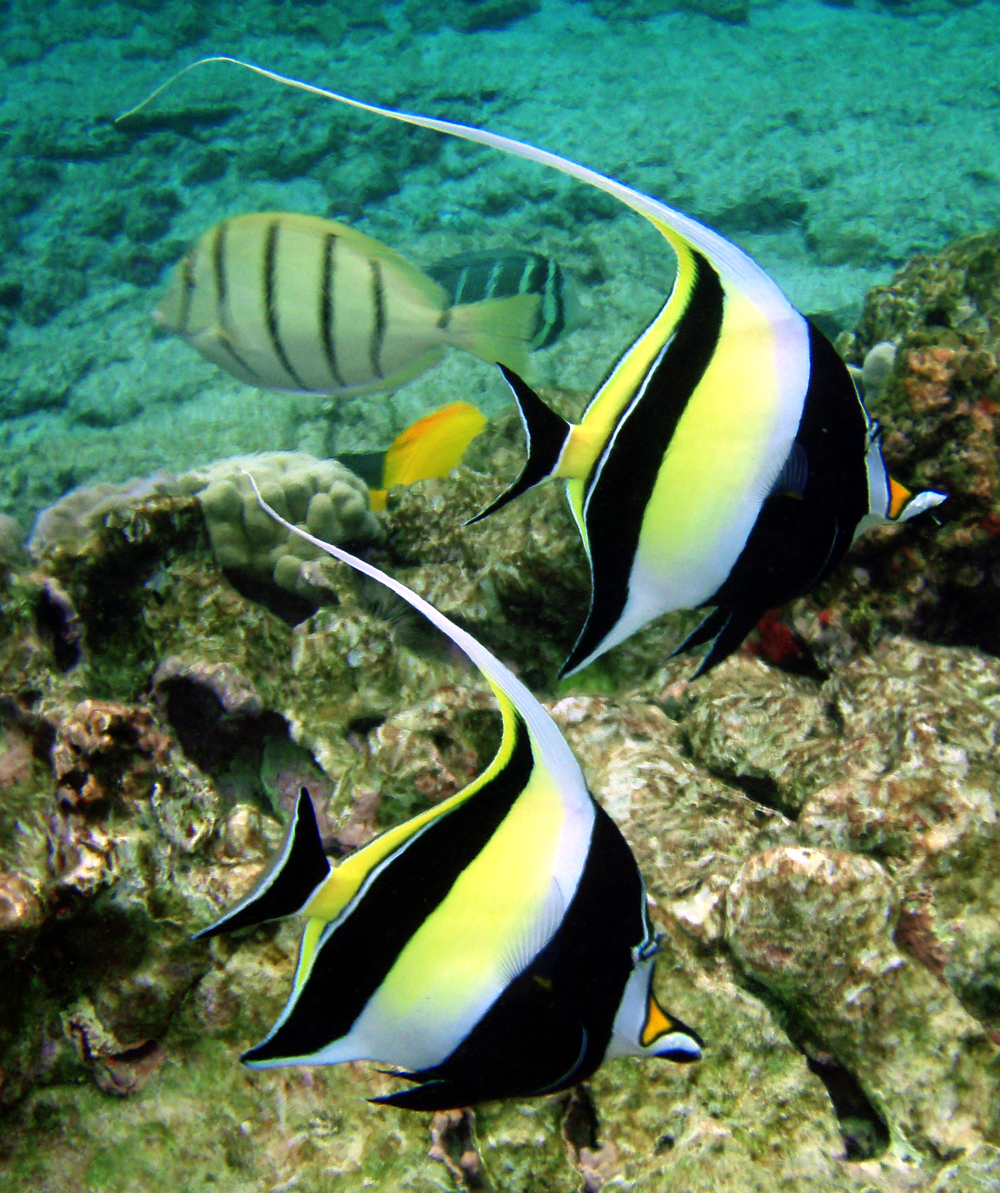

Scientific classification
- Kingdom: Animalia
- Phylum: Chordata
- Class: Actinopterygii
- Order: Acanthuriformes
- Suborder: Acanthuroidei
- Family: Zanclidae; Bleeker, 1876

= Zanclidae =

Zanclidae Temporal range: Early Eocene to present

Family of ray-finned fishes

Zanclidae is a family of marine ray-finned fishes belonging to the suborder Acanthuroidei within the order Acanthuriformes. It contains one extant species, the Moorish idol (Zanclus cornutus) and a number of extinct species.

== Genera and species ==
Zanclidae has the following taxa classified within it:

- Genus Zanclus Cuvier, 1831
  - Species Zanclus cornutus (Linnaeus, 1758) (Moorish idol)
- Genus †Massalongius Tyler and Bannikov, 2005
  - Species †Massalongius gazolai (Massalongo, 1859)
- Genus †Angiolinia Carnevale & Tyler, 2024
  - Species †Angiolinia mirabilis Carnevale & Tyler, 2024
- Genus †Eozanclus Blot & Voruz, 1975
  - Species † Eozanclus brevirostris (Agassiz, 1835)

(† means extinct) Eozanclus brevirostris is an extinct species in the Zanclidae family that was first discovered by Giovanni Serafino Volta in 1796. The species later received separate taxonomic status within the Zanclidae family through the description of Blot and Voruz in 1970 and 1975. Angiolinia mirabilis is another extinct Zanclid that was described by Giorgio Carnevale and James C. Tyler in 2024 based on three specimens found in Bolca, Italy. Carnevale & Tyler found that Zanclus cornutus and Angiolinia mirabilis form a derived clade distinguishable from Eozanclus brevirostris by one supernumerary spine on the first dorsal-fin pterygiophore, one uroneural in the caudal skeleton, and distally filamentous dorsal-fin spines (except the first two fins).

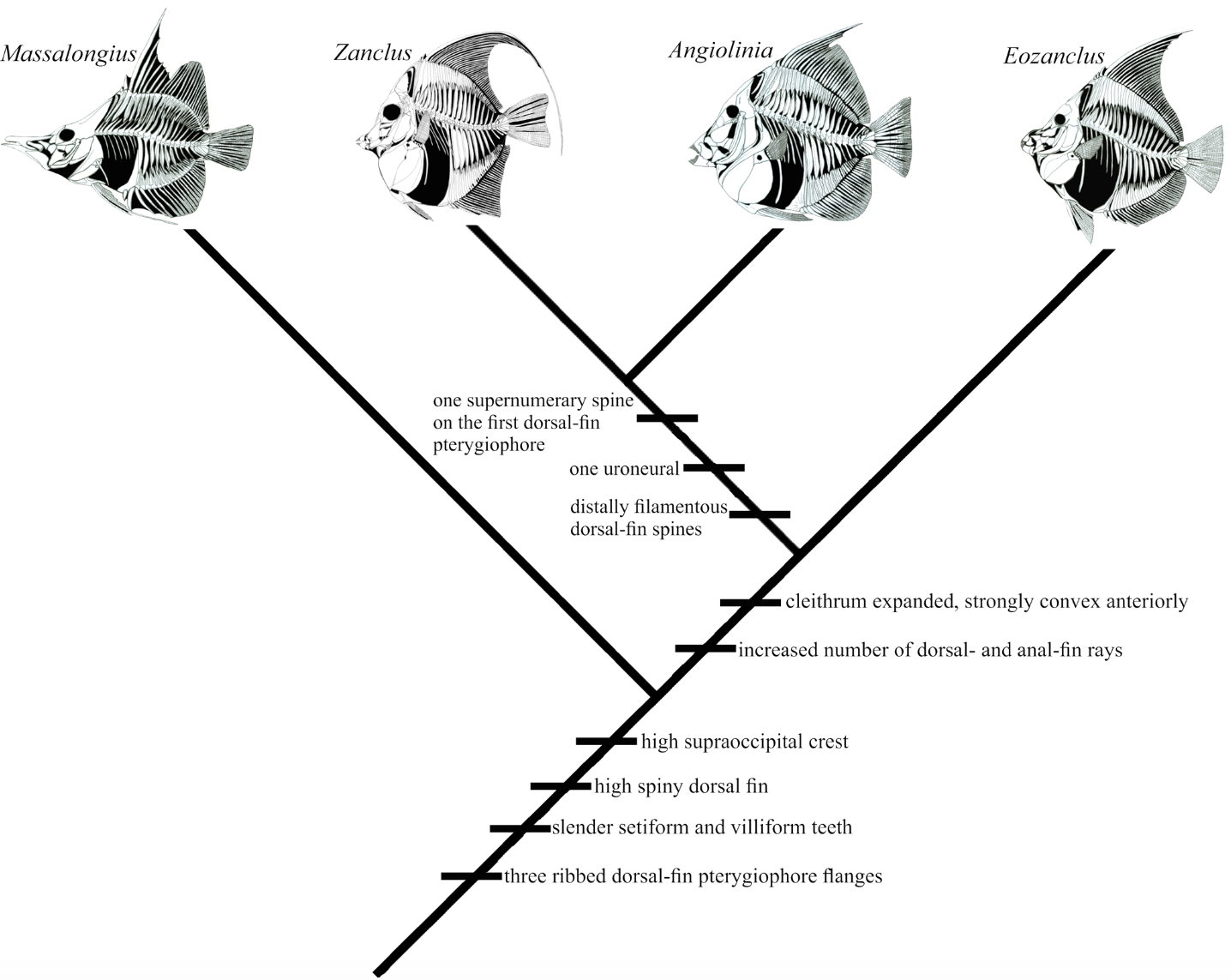
Proposed Zanclidae cladogram by Carnevale & Tyler

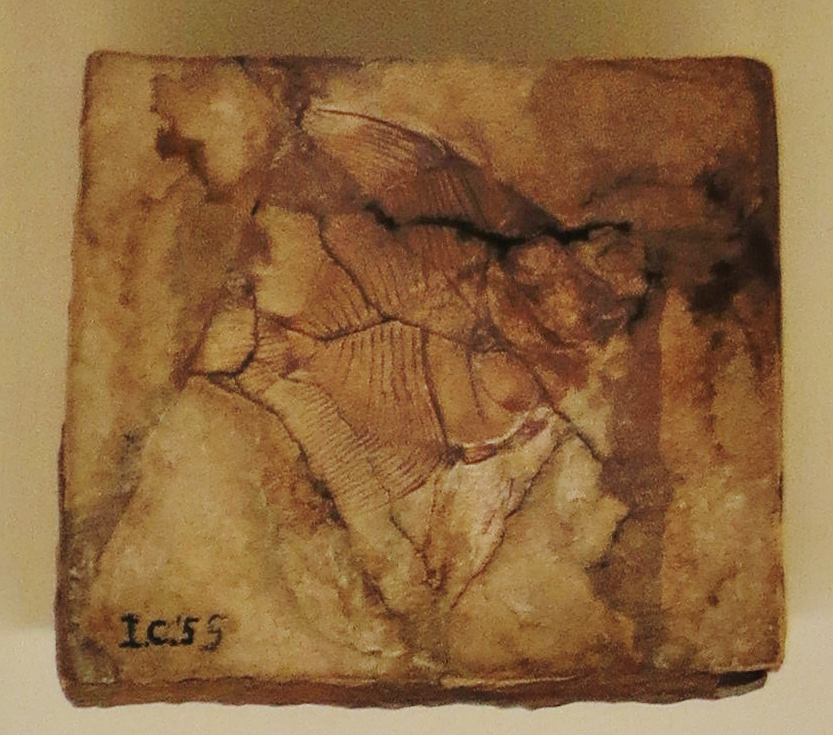
Eozanclus fossil
