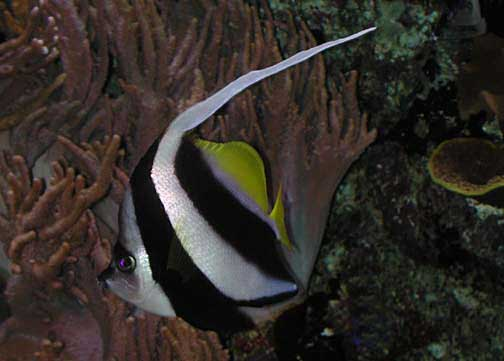

Conservation status
- Least Concern (IUCN 3.1)

Scientific classification
- Kingdom: Animalia
- Phylum: Chordata
- Class: Actinopterygii
- Order: Acanthuriformes
- Family: Chaetodontidae
- Genus: Heniochus
- Species: H. diphreutes

Binomial name
- Heniochus diphreutes D. S. Jordan, 1903

= Schooling bannerfish =

Species of fish

The schooling bannerfish (Heniochus diphreutes), also known as the false moorish idol, is a marine ray-finned fish, a butterflyfish from the family Chaetodontidae. It is native to the Indo-Pacific area.

== Description ==
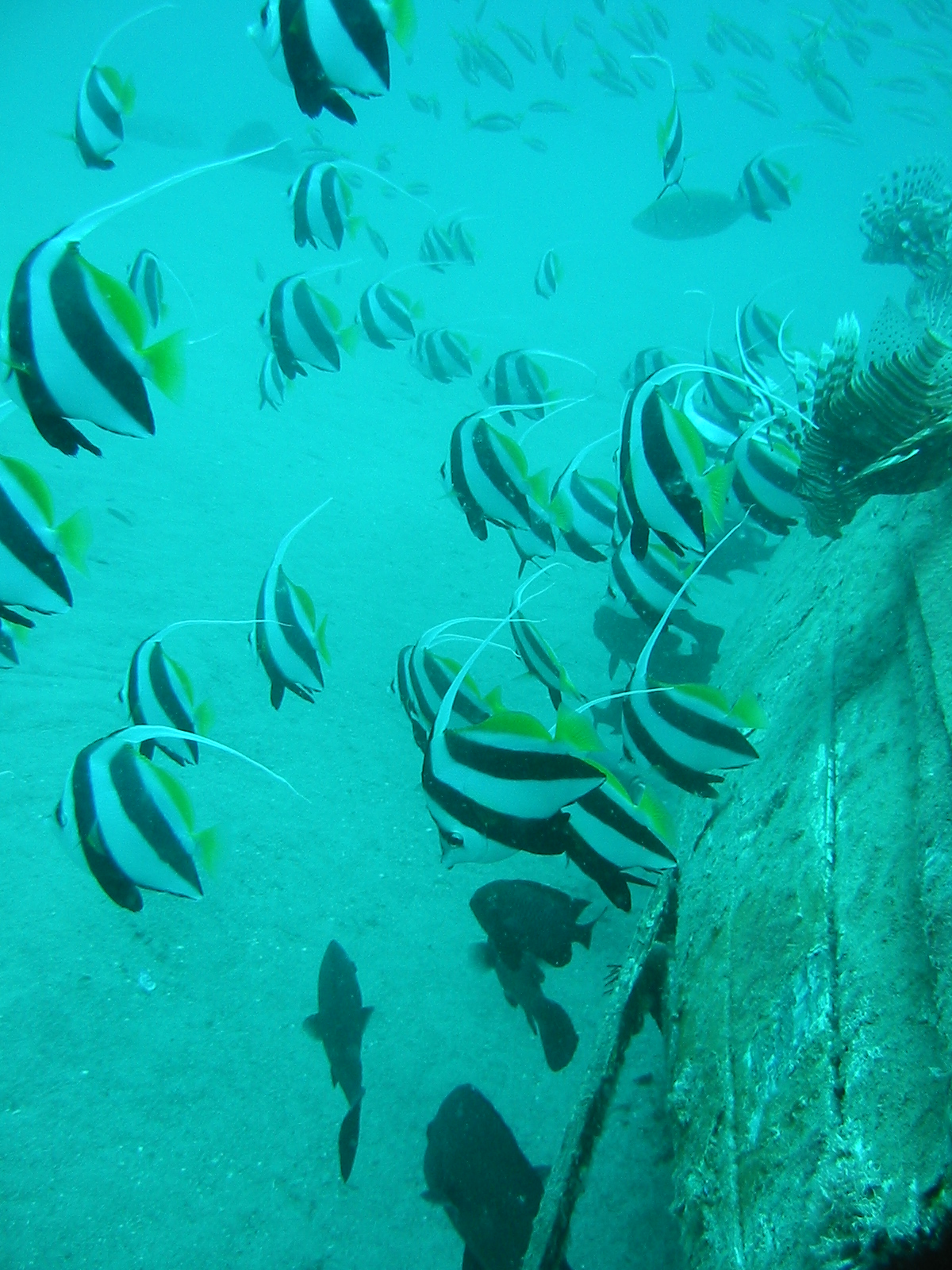
Schooling on a wreck, Taba, Egypt.

The schooling bannerfish is a small fish that can reach a maximum length of 18–21 cm.

Its body is compressed laterally, and the first rays of its dorsal fin stretch in a long white filament. Its background color is white with two large black diagonal bands. Beyond the second black stripe, the dorsal, caudal fins and pectoral fins are yellow. The head is white, the eyes are black and linked together by a black to gray band. The short snout, spotted with black to gray, has a small terminal, extensible mouth.

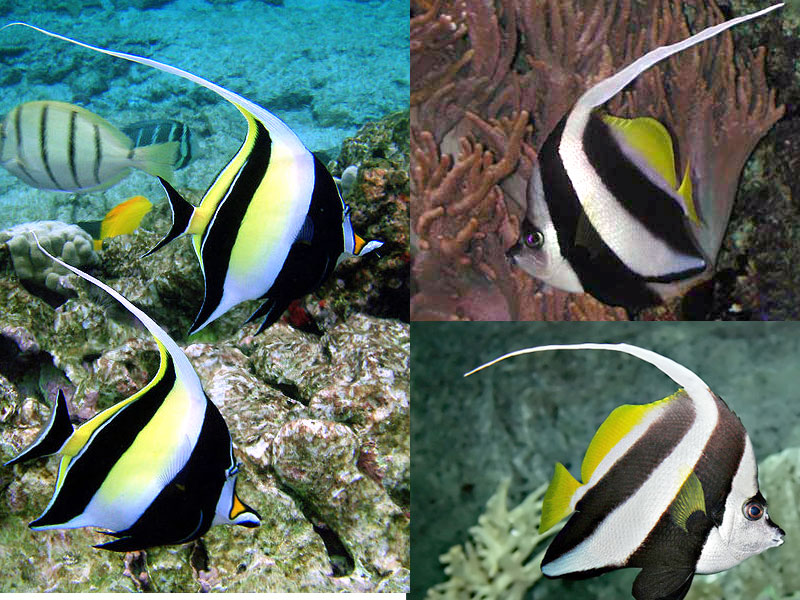
A comparison of three similar species: moorish idol (left), schooling bannerfish (top), and pennant coralfish (bottom)

== Distribution and habitat ==
The schooling bannerfish is widespread throughout the tropical, subtropical and temperate waters of the Indo-Pacific from the eastern coast of Africa, Red Sea included, to Polynesia and Hawaii and from the Great Barrier Reef, to south Japan to the Kermadec Islands (New Zealand).

The schooling bannerfish prefers external reef slopes and channels. It has a large depth range and is usually observed at 5–30 m depth, but may reach 210 meters deep in some localities.

== Ecology ==
As is indicated by its common name, the schooling bannerfish lives in large groups. It feeds on zooplankton in the open water, and juveniles may act as cleaner fish, and this has also been seen in adults. This oviparous species forms pairs to breed. They have been observed cleaning parasites off the short sunfish (Mola ramsayi) off the Maldives.

== Conservation status ==
In some geographic areas, the schooling bannerfish is harvested for the aquarium trade and is commonly sold as a cheaper alternative to the Moorish idol. However, there do not appear to be any major current threats to this species, and it is listed as Least Concern by the IUCN.
