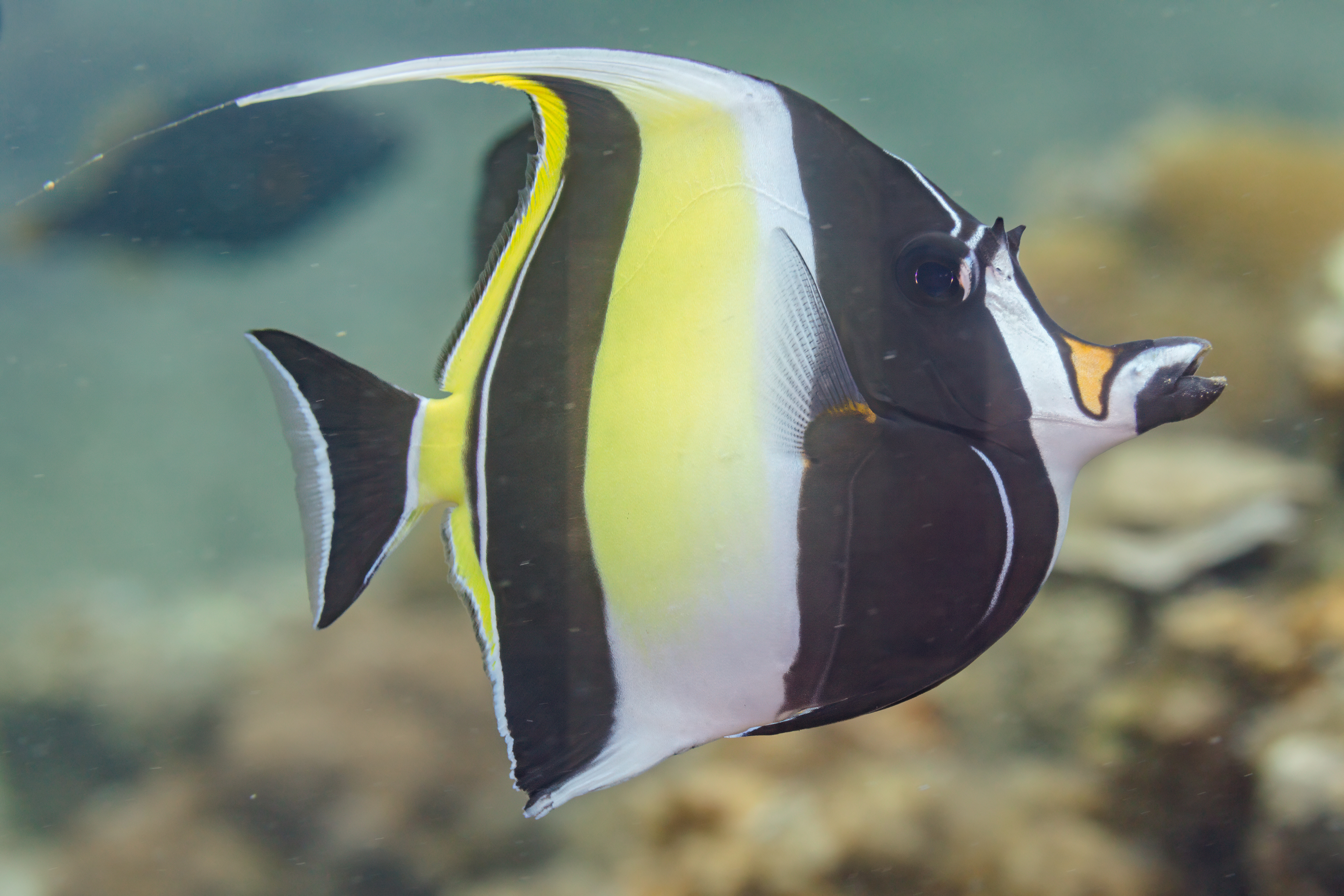
- In the Philippines

Conservation status
- Least Concern (IUCN 3.1)

Scientific classification
- Kingdom: Animalia
- Phylum: Chordata
- Class: Actinopterygii
- Division: Teleostei
- Order: Acanthuriformes
- Suborder: Acanthuroidei
- Family: Zanclidae
- Genus: Zanclus; Cuvier in Cuvier and Valenciennes, 1831
- Species: Z. cornutus

Binomial name
- Zanclus cornutus (Linnaeus, 1758)
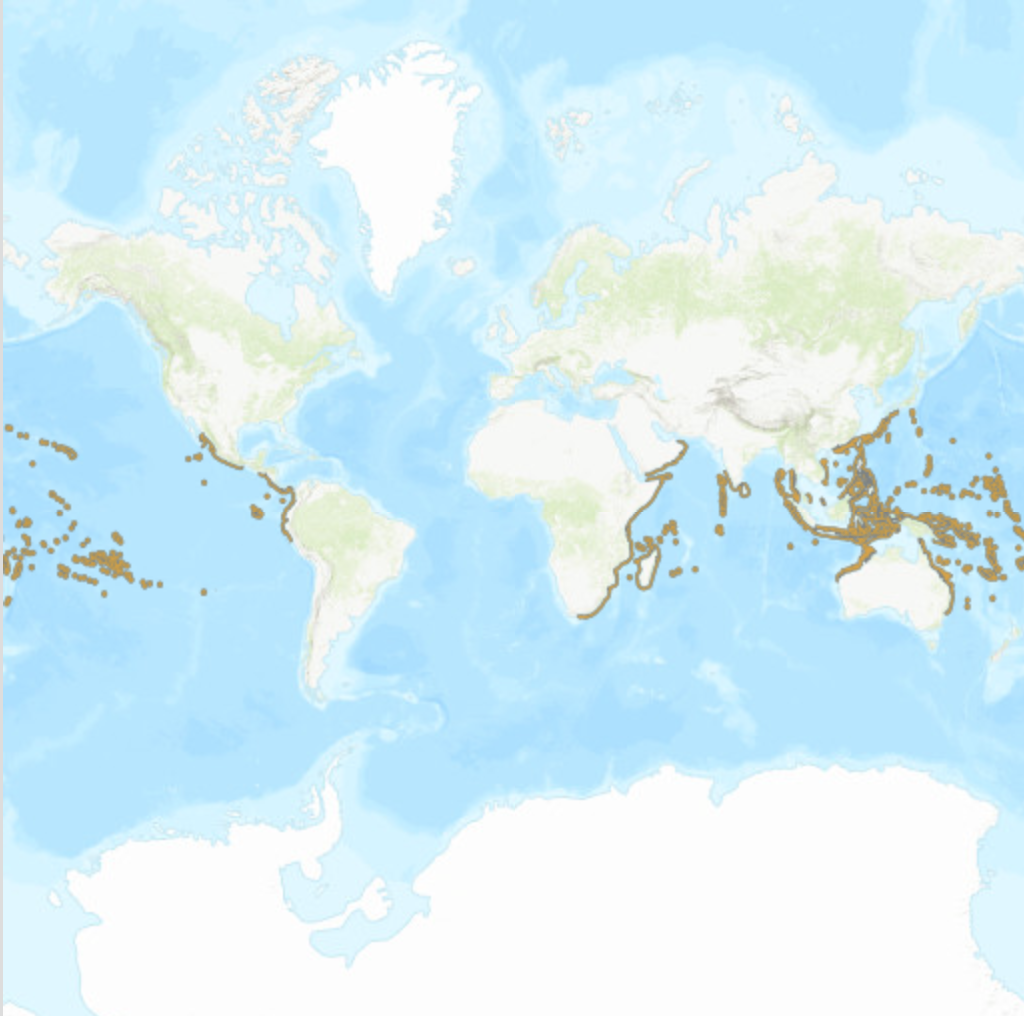
- Distribution of the Moorish idol

Synonyms
- Chaetodon cornutus Linnaeus, 1758; Chaetodon canescens Linnaeus, 1758; Zanclus canescens (Linnaeus, 1758)

= Moorish idol =

Species of fish

The Moorish idol (Zanclus cornutus) is a species of marine ray-finned fish belonging to the family Zanclidae. It is the only member of the monospecific genus Zanclus and the only extant species within the Zanclidae. This species is found on reefs in the Indo-Pacific region.

== Taxonomy ==
The Moorish idol was first formally described as Chaetodon cornutus in 1758 by Carl Linnaeus in the 10th edition of the Systema Naturae with "Indian Seas" given as its type locality. In 1831 Georges Cuvier classified it in the new monospecific genus Zanclus. In 1876 Pieter Bleeker proposed the monotypic family Zanclidae. The Zanclidae is classified within the suborder Acanthuroidei of the order Acanthuriformes. Some authors classify the Moorish idols in the surgeonfish family Acanthuridae but the absence of spines on the caudal peduncle is a clear difference between this species and the surgeonfishes.

The Moorish idol is the only extant member of its family, the Zanclidae, making it a relict. A number of extinct relatives are known.

== Etymology ==
The Moorish idol's unusual common name was apparently given to it because, in some areas of southeast Asia, fishermen have respect for these fishes, releasing them when caught and honouring them with a bow after their release. In this case, "Moor" is erroneously used as it usually refers to Amazigh people from Morocco where this fish does not occur in the wild, although this term may be related to the practice of referring to muslims in Sri Lanka and India as "Moors" during the colonial period.

The genus name Zanclus is derived from the Ancient Greek word zanklon, meaning "sickle", and is an allusion to the long curved dorsal fin. The specific name, cornutus, means "horned", and refers to the small bony protuberances over the eyes.

== Distribution ==
The Moorish idol has a wide range in the Indian and Pacific Oceans. They are found from the eastern coast of Africa between Somalia and South Africa east to Hawaii and Easter Island. They are also found in the eastern Pacific from the southern Gulf of California to Peru, including many islands such as the Galapagos and Cocos Island.

== Habitat ==
The Moorish idol lives between depths of 1–180 metres (3 ft 3 in – 590 ft 7 in) in turbid lagoons, reef flats, and clear rocky- and coral reefs. As with many reef fishes, habitat has been found to be an important and influential factor in the abundance of Moorish idols.

== Description ==
The Moorish idol's body is highly laterally compressed and disc-like in shape with a tube-like snout and small bony protuberances above the eyes in adults. The mouth is small and has many long, bristle like teeth. There are no spines or serrations on the preoperculum or caudal peduncle. The dorsal fin is supported by 6 or 7 spines, which are elongated into a long filament which resembles a whip, and between 39 and 45 soft rays. The anal fin contains 3 spines and between 31 and 37 soft rays. The maximum published total length is 23 cm (9.1 in), although 21 cm (8.3 in) is more typical. They have a white background color, with two wide black vertical bands on the body with a yellow patch on the posterior end of the body and a yellow saddle on the snout. The caudal fin is black with a white margin.

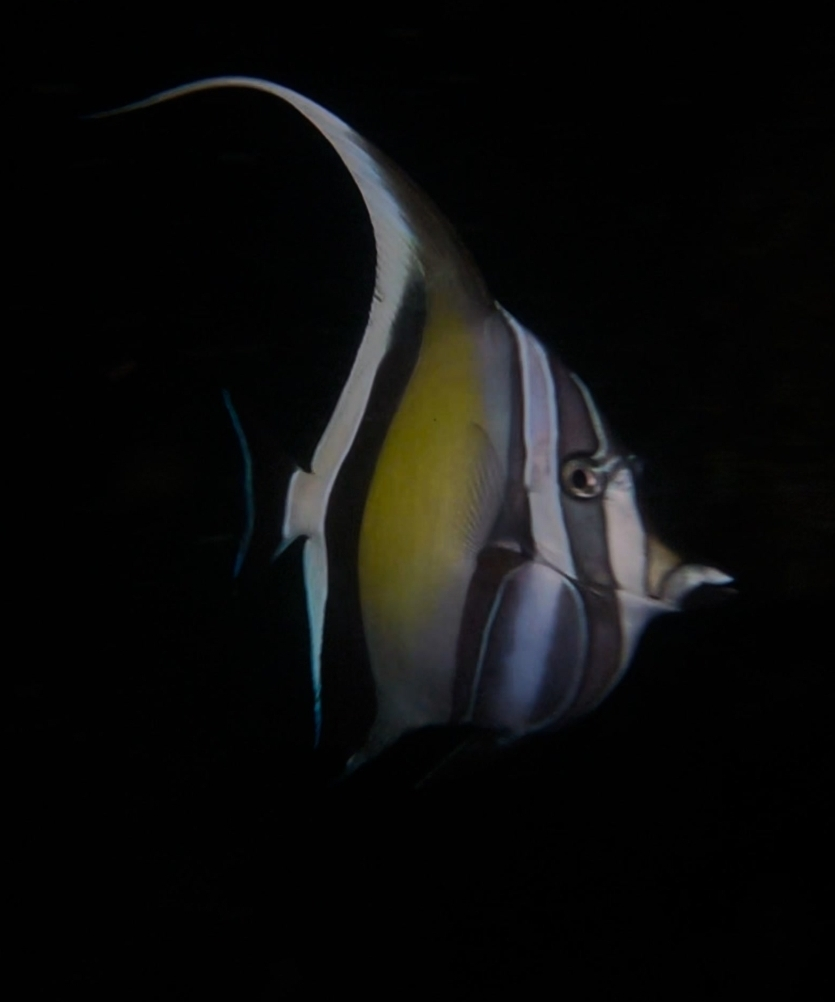
Night-time colouration

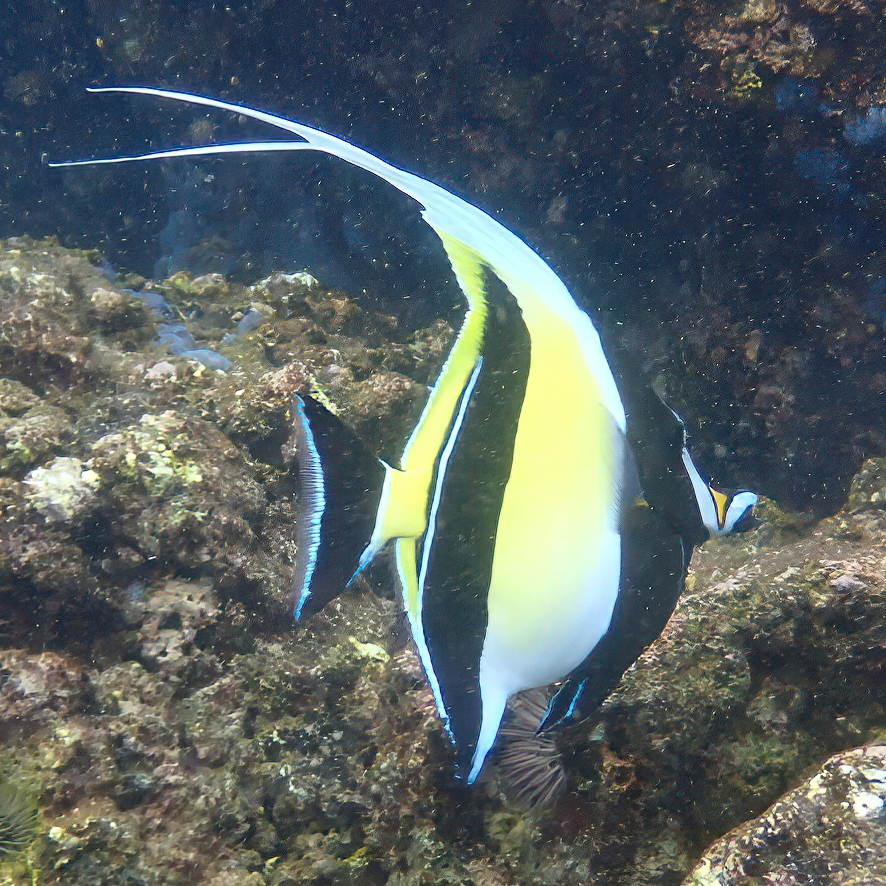
With two dorsal filaments

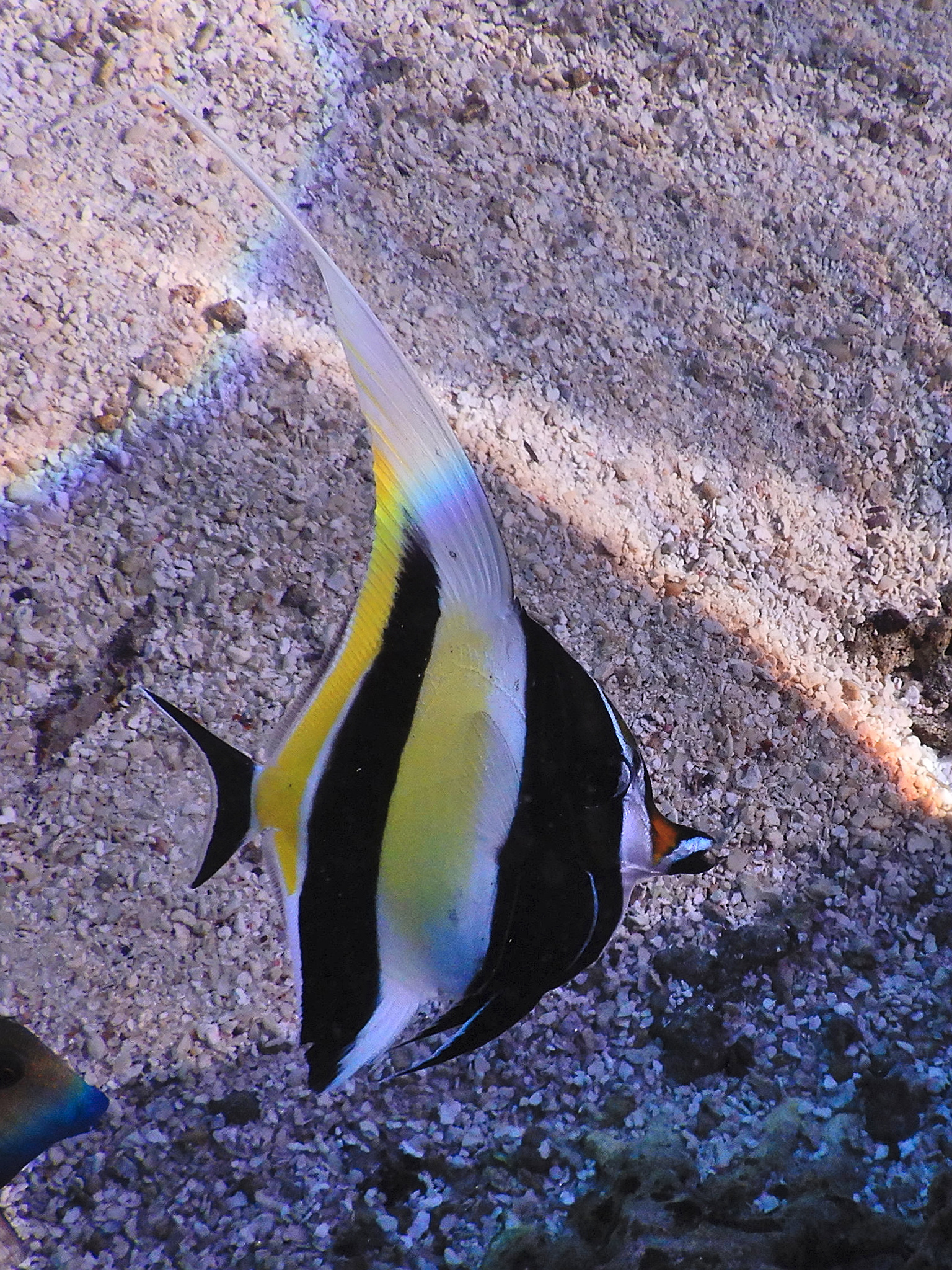
With extended dorsal fin

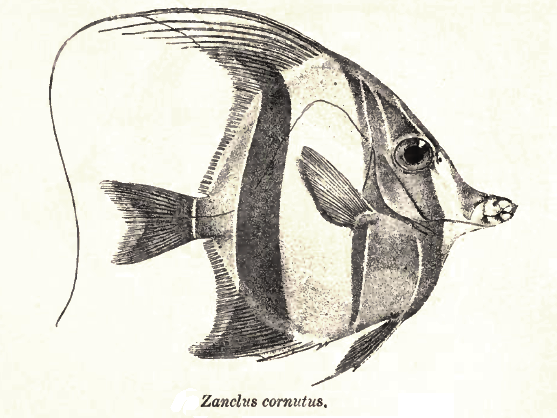
Illustration (Sir Francis Day, 1889)

== Biology ==
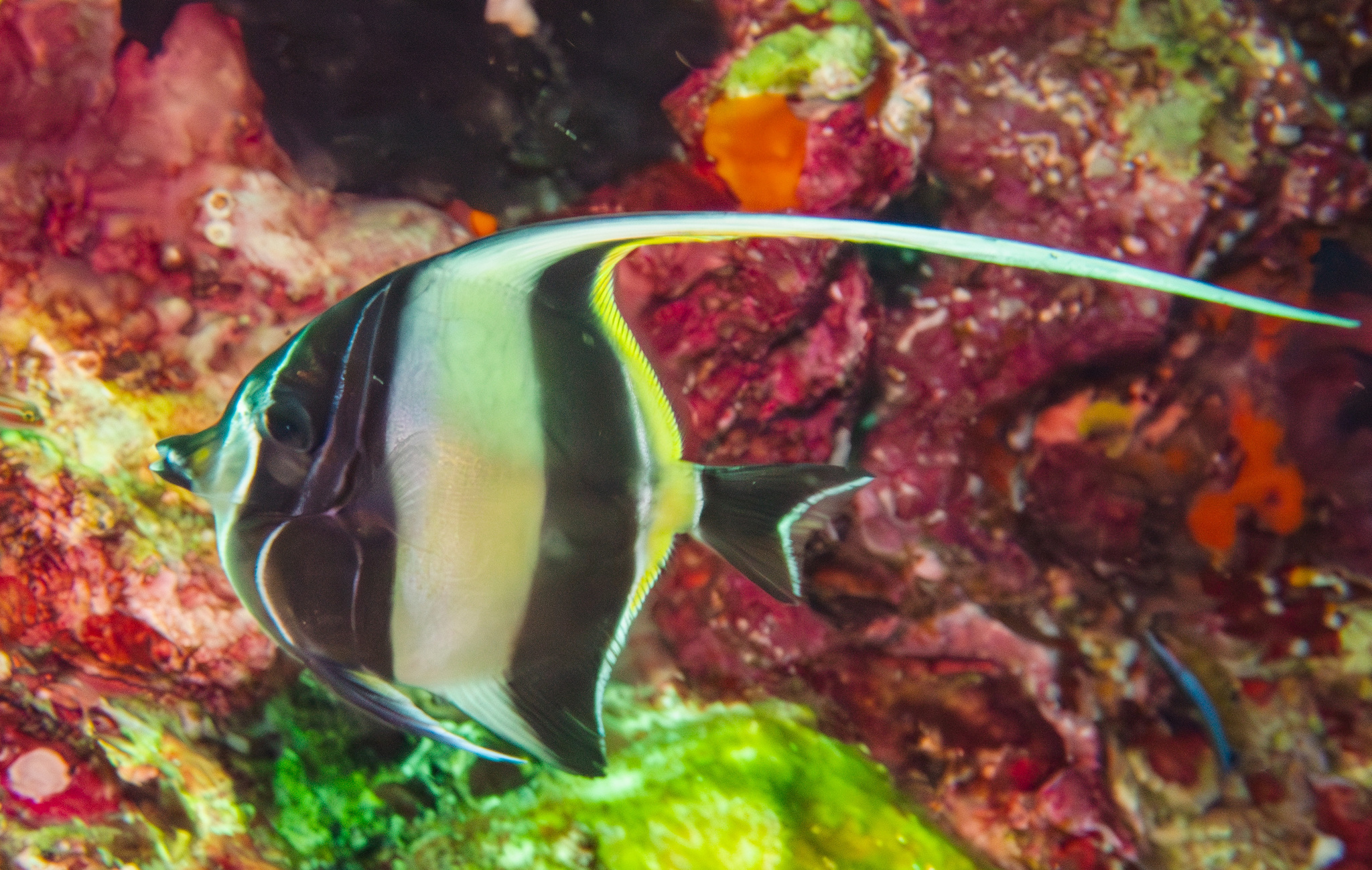
Juvenile stage

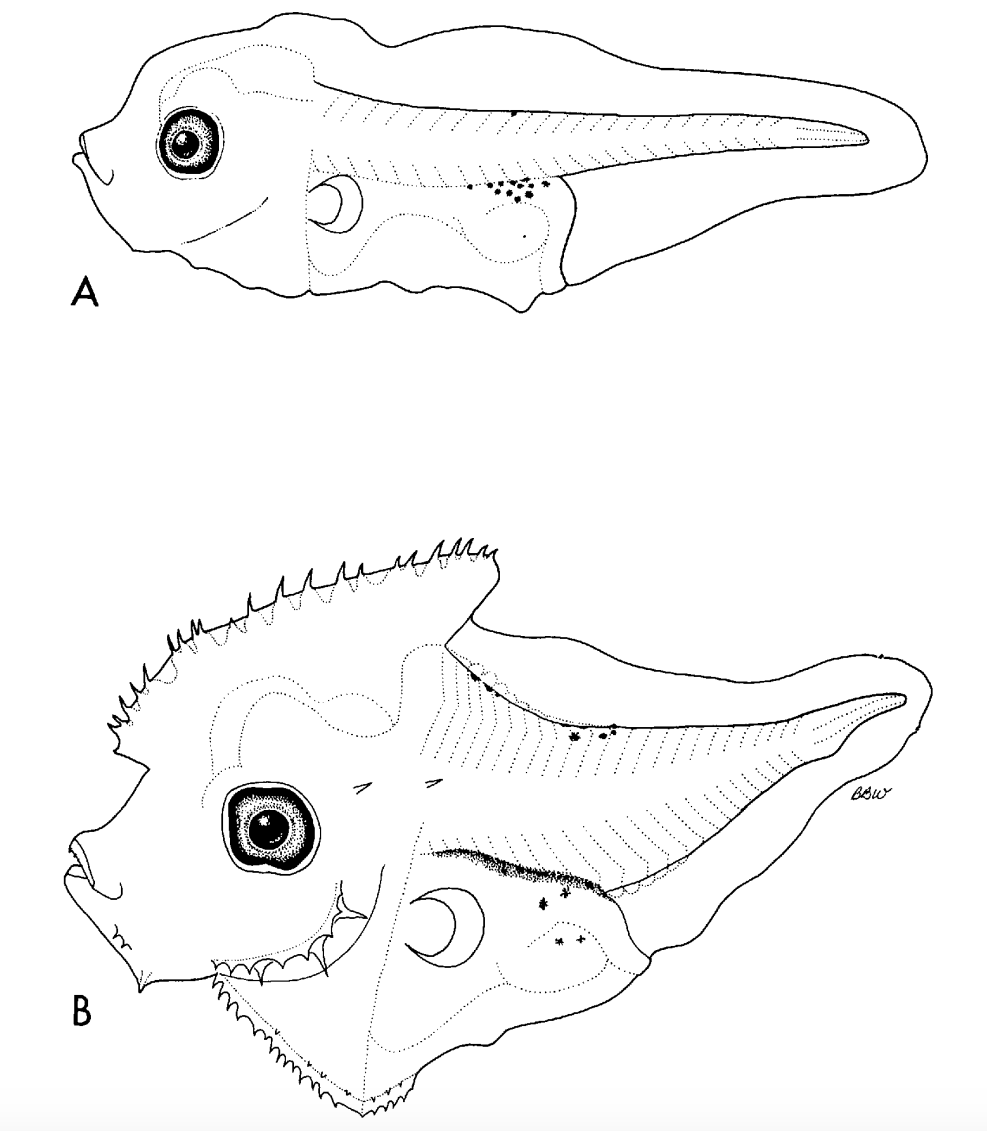
Preflexion larvae. A is a 2.8 mm (notochord length) specimen. B is a 3.2 mm (notochord length) specimen.

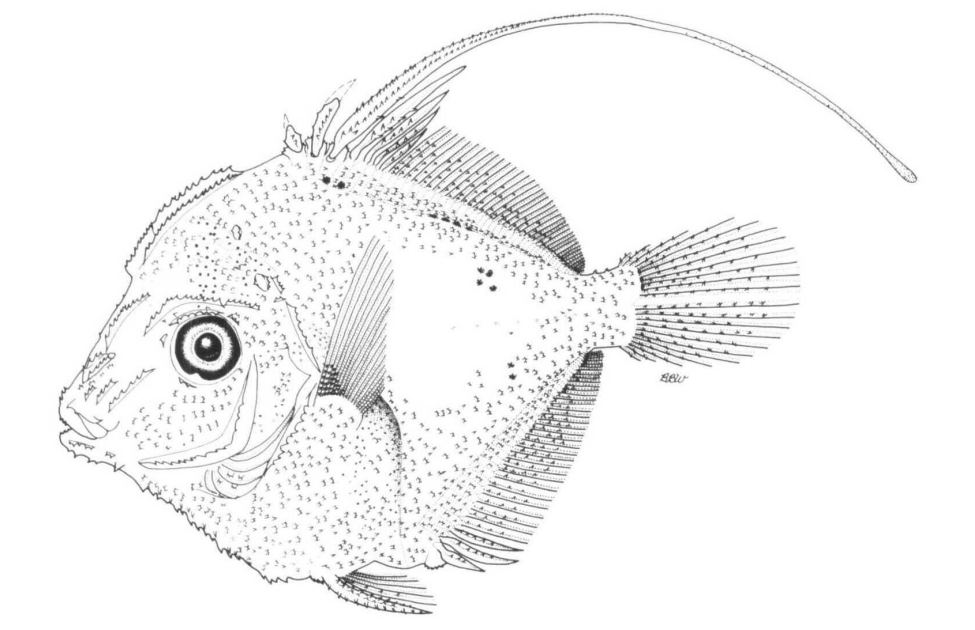
Postflexion larva measuring 9.5 mm (standard length).

Moorish idols mostly feed on sponges, with a study on gut content finding sponges make up about 70% of the total weight consumed by Moorish idols, but they also feed upon algae, coral polyps, tunicates and other benthic invertebrates, making them somewhat omnivorous. They are normally found in small groups of 2 or 3 individuals but they can also be solitary or gather in large schools.

=== Reproduction ===
These fish are pelagic spawners. The males and females release sperm and eggs into the water, and the eggs drift away on the current following fertilization. Like their closely related family, the Acanthuridae, the Moorish idol has larvae that are specialized for a long pelagic life stage, and this is why they are so widespread and geographically uniform. In acanthuridae, the pelagic, pre-juvenile stage larvae can reach lengths of 60 mm before settling in their habitat. The Moorish idol's various larval stages have been described and illustrated. The preflexion larval stage refers to the stage from hatchling to the start of upward flexion of the notochord. The preflexion larval stage of the Moorish idol has no fin spines, soft rays, or internal support structures for the fins. However, in a 3.2 mm specimen there is the start of the dorsal and anal fins. The larger preflexion specimens have mostly cartilaginous supraoccipital crests with 23 to 26 curved dorsal spines. Also, pigmentation increases with size in the preflexion larvae. The postflexion larval stage refers to the stage that includes the formation of the caudal fin and fin rays. This is the stage right before juvenile and settlement into their habitat. In the postflexion stage, the Moorish idol larvae have fully developed fins, their body form is compressed and deep-bodied. The larvae have a small terminal mouth and kite shaped body. They have seven dorsal spines at the start of their dorsal fin that are covered in small spines. Their third dorsal spine is very long (about 1.2x their standard length). They also have one pelvic fin spine and three anal fin spines covered in small spines.

==== Spawning aggregations in Palau ====
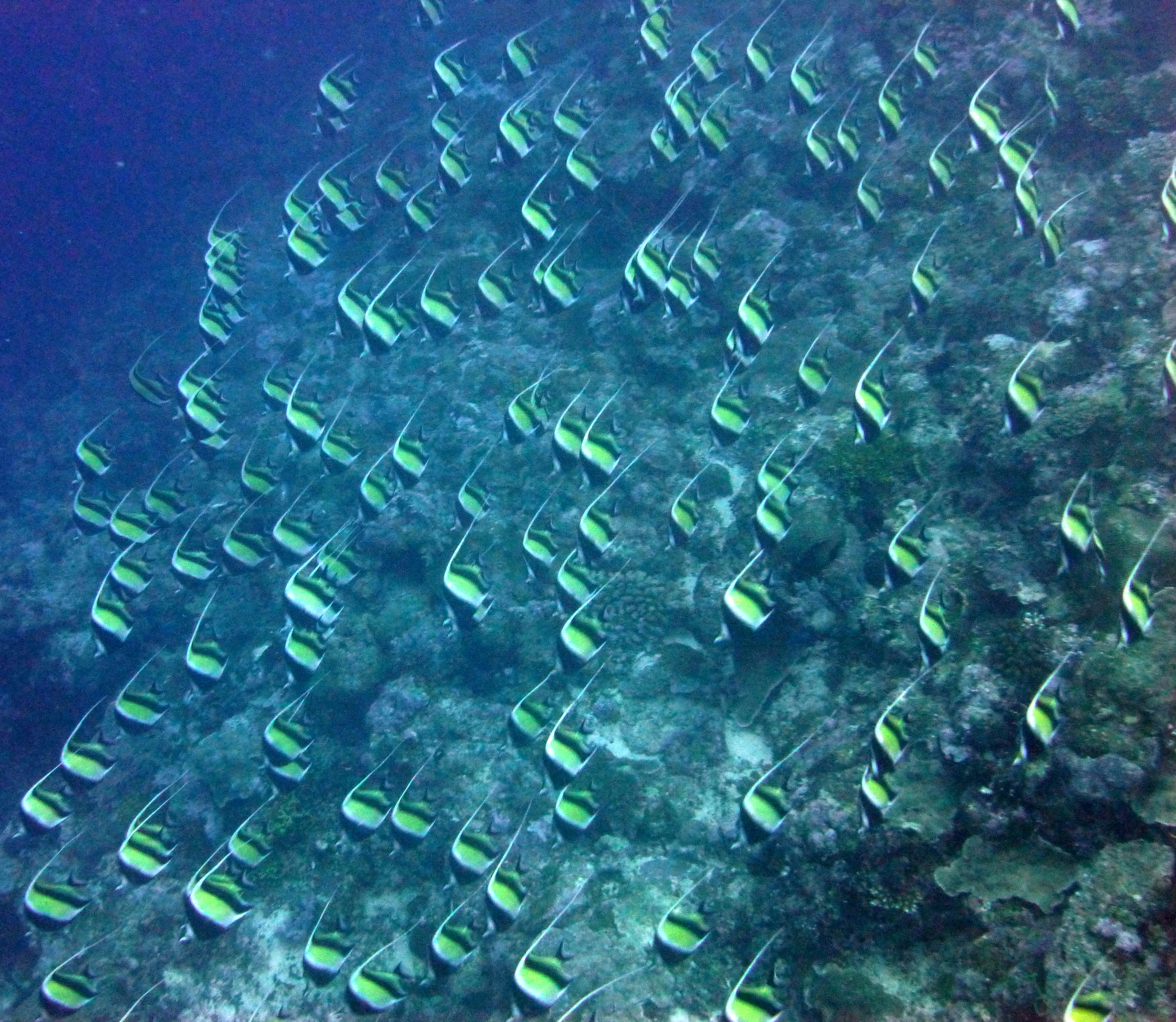
Spawning aggregation in Palau

Unlike in most other areas of the world, Moorish idols in Palau aggregate in schools of hundreds of fish to spawn. The reason for it is unknown. This annual winter "blue water spawning" event lasts from December to March, but peaks in January and February. Moorish idols aggregate in the morning, forming tight synchronous schools that move up and down the reef until mid-day. At mid-day, aggregations ascend upwards from the reef and swim towards the open ocean, often at the ocean surface. Spawning eventually follows.

A great diversity of large predatory fish species take this opportunity to hunt the aggregations while they are still on the reef, often forming multi-species hunting packs. This notably includes packs of hundreds of grey reef sharks, which will also follow the Moorish idols when a school moves away from the safety of the reef to spawn. Once the Moorish idols enter the open water, the grey reef sharks attack in a tight cluster and enter a feeding frenzy, eventually eating most of the school. Only a few Moorish idols in a school may survive the sharks. As a result of the extremely high mortality rate, these spawning events have been described as seeming "suicidal".

The first episode of BBC's Asia documentary series features a spawning school of Moorish idols being hunted by grey reef sharks in Palau.

== Conservation status ==
Since their last assessment in 2015, the Moorish idol is listed as a species of least concern by the IUCN. They were found to be widely distributed and locally abundant with no major threats to the species. However, their habitat type, particularly coral reefs, are known to be in decline due to climate change. The species has been found to do well in restored coral reefs and artificial reef structures.

== In the aquarium ==
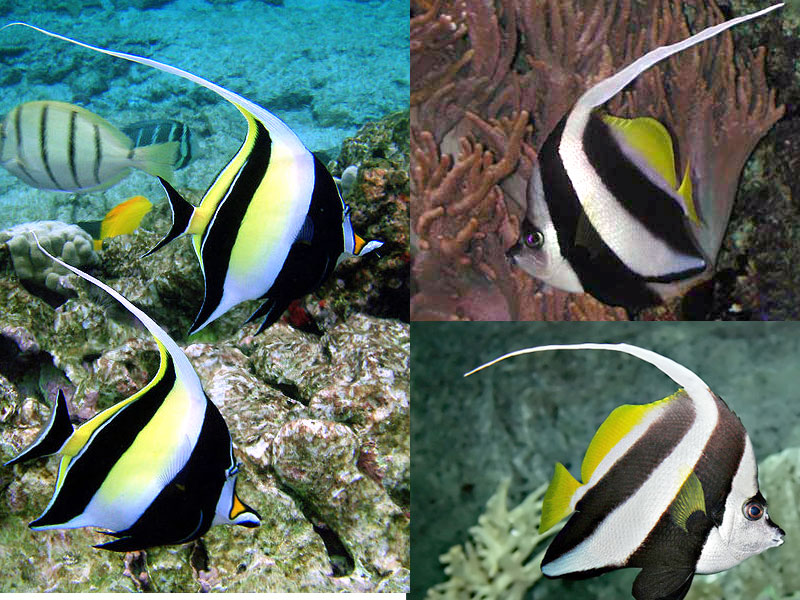
Comparison between the Moorish idol (left), schooling bannerfish (top) and pennant coralfish (bottom)

Moorish idols are notoriously difficult to maintain in captivity. They require large tanks, often exceeding 380 L (84 imp gal; 100 US gal), are voracious eaters, and can become destructive.

Some aquarists prefer to keep substitute species that look very similar to the Moorish idol. These substitutes are all butterflyfishes of the genus Heniochus and include the pennant coralfish, H. acuminatus; threeband pennantfish, H. chrysostomus and the false Moorish idol, H. diphreutes.

In captivity, Moorish idols typically are very picky eaters. They will either eat no food and perish, or eat everything all at once. They are reportedly able to live for up to several years in captivity.

== In popular culture ==
- In the 2003 Disney/Pixar animated film Finding Nemo, a Moorish idol fish named Gill, voiced by Willem Dafoe, is one of Nemo's tank mates and the leader of the Tank Gang. Gill was depicted having a very strong desire for freedom outside of the aquarium and was constantly scheming to achieve this, possibly alluding to the difficulty of keeping real-life Moorish idols in captivity. Gill and the other members of the Tank Gang appeared in the 2016 sequel, Finding Dory, in a post credits scene.
