= Corallivore =

Animal that feeds on coral

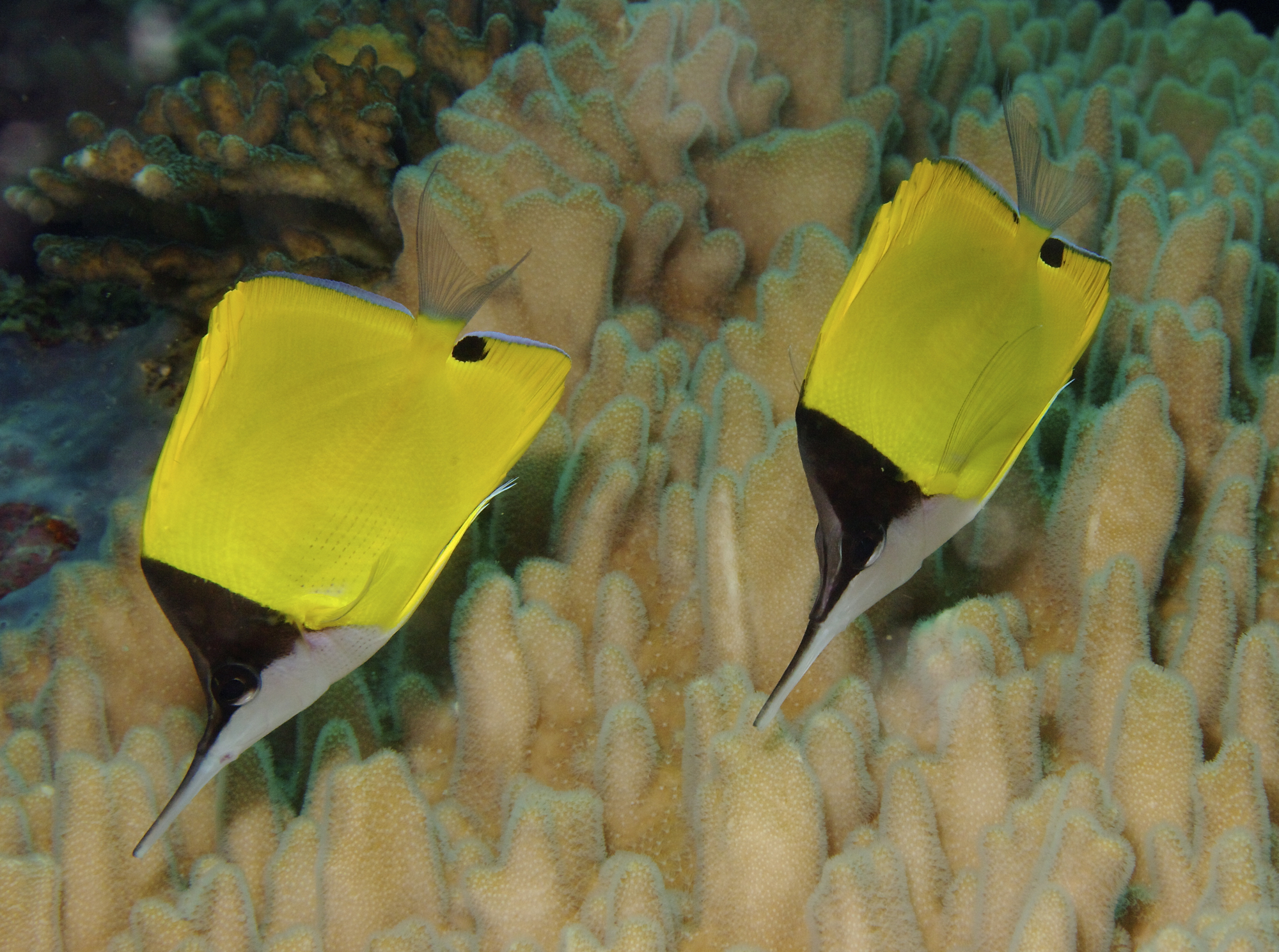
Yellow longnose butterflyfish browsing on coral polyps

A corallivore is a carnivorous animal that feeds on coral. Corallivores are an important group of reef organism because they can influence coral abundance, distribution, and community structure. Corallivores feed on coral using a variety of unique adaptations and strategies. Known corallivores include certain mollusks, annelids, fish, crustaceans, flatworms and echinoderms. The first recorded evidence of corallivory was presented by Charles Darwin in 1842 during his voyage on HMS Beagle in which he found coral in the stomach of two Scarus parrotfish.

== History ==
While visiting the Cocos (Keeling) Islands in 1842, Charles Darwin was told by an Englishman living on the islands that there were large shoals of parrotfish that subsisted entirely on coral. Darwin dissected several parrotfish and found pieces of coral and finely ground calcareous material in their stomach. This led Darwin to correctly theorize that some species of parrotfish consume coral and contribute sediment to the environment by passing finely ground particles from coral skeletons.

In 1952, the first descriptions of organisms actively consuming coral were written by Jacques Cousteau and published in National Geographic. During his trip to the Red Sea aboard RV Calypso, Cousteau swam with a pair of green humphead parrotfish and watched them take regular bites and leaving white scars on the coral around them. Like Darwin, Cousteau also noticed the sediment particles that were produced in the parrotfishes' waste and settled to the seafloor. Cousteau noted the leisurely speed with which the parrotfish consumed the coral and remarked that they appeared "unhurried" and like "sea cows, browsing on stone pastures."

The term "corallivore" comes from the Latin word corallum for coral and -vora for to eat or devour.

== Types ==
Approximately one-third of known corallivores are obligate corallivores, while the remaining two-thirds are facultative corallivores. Obligate corallivory is defined as having a diet which is at least 80% coral. Obligate corallivores are present in all tropical oceans, except the Caribbean. Facultative corallivores are defined as organisms that regularly consume coral without it comprising a large percentage of their diet.

It is thought that some facultative corallivores, such as some damselfish, eat coral to promote algal growth. Many facultative corallivores also graze on algae, which competes with coral for space and resources. By grazing coral, it may provide better conditions for algal growth. Aggressive grazing may keep the algal community in a state of accelerated growth, effectively preventing the transition to a slower growing community.

== Feeding strategies ==
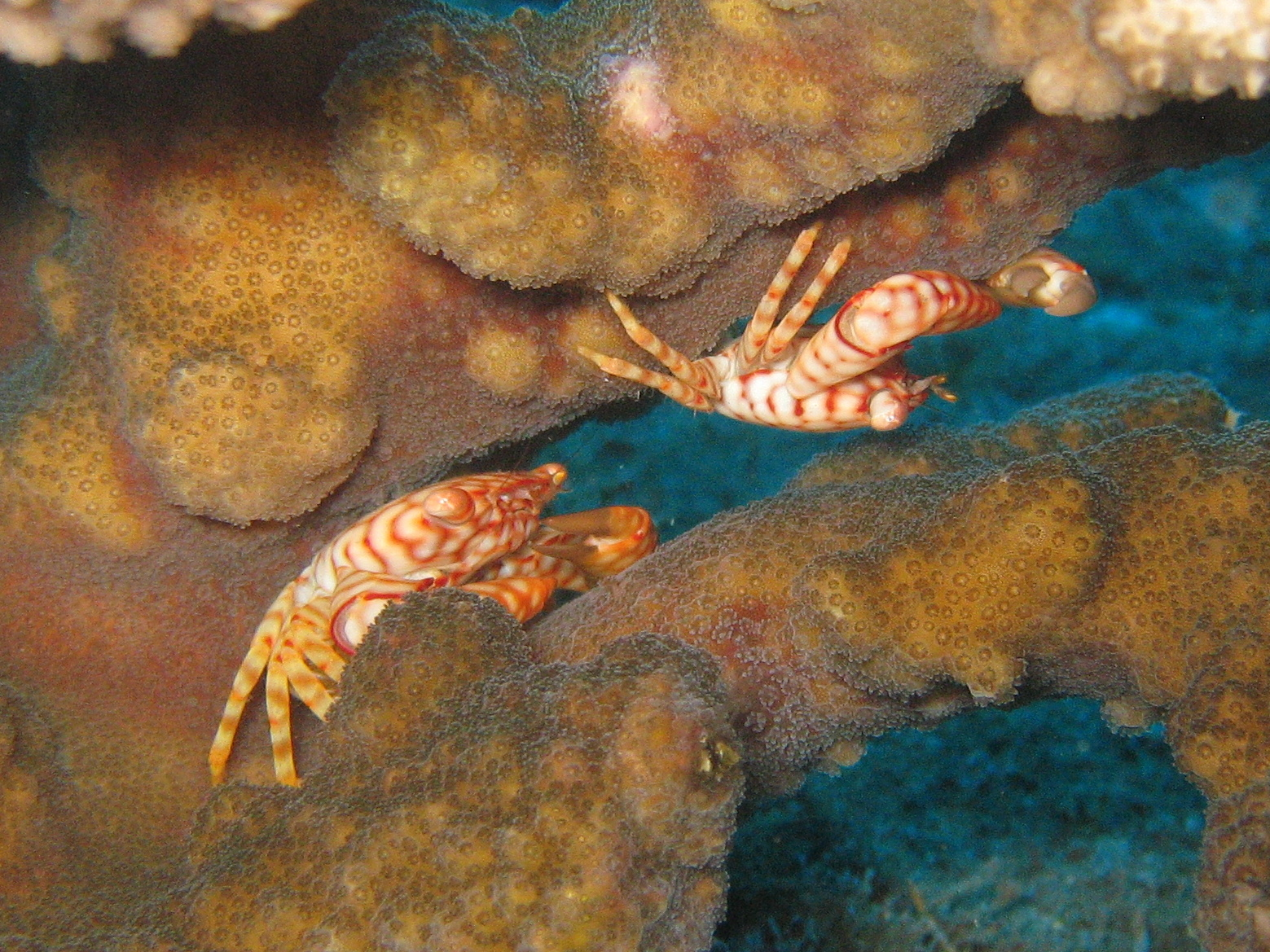
Trapezia crab on Pocillopora

Organisms display different strategies for consuming coral. The majority of corallivores feed on stony coral, however, a few species feed on soft coral. There are no known obligate soft coral feeder; soft coral is estimated to be a small percentage of the diet of soft coral feeders. The most common genera of coral consumed are Acropora, Pocillopora, Montipora, and Porites. Only 18 out of the 111 described coral genera are known to be consumed by corallivores.

=== Mucus feeders ===
Mucus feeders feed exclusively on coral mucus. Coral regularly slough off mucus into the surrounding water, so it is thought that mucus feeding causes no harm to the coral. However, it has been shown to disrupt microbial communities living on the coral. Many mucus feeders have shown a preference towards damaged corals, which typically produce more mucus than undamaged corals.

=== Browsers ===
Browsers eat coral tissue without damaging the coral's calcium carbonate skeleton. The majority of corallivore species are browsers.

=== Scrapers ===
Scrapers consume live coral tissue and small portions of the coral's calcium carbonate skeleton.

=== Excavators ===
Excavators consume live coral tissue and large portions of the coral's calcium carbonate skeleton. Excavators can be further broken down to "spot biters" and "focused biters". Spot biters take bites that are scattered over a colony's surface, while focused biters bite repeatedly in the same area. At one time, focused biting was thought to be a display of territoriality in parrotfish, but was later determined to be for food. Out of all of the kinds of corallivores, excavators are thought to have the biggest impact on coral reef communities due to the large amount of coral and skeleton consumed. Additionally, studies suggest that the damage from excavating takes significantly longer to heal than other types of corallivory.

=== Bioeroders ===
Bioeroders consume dead coral substrate. Bioeroders are thought to help reshape coral reef landscapes by eroding dead corals.

== In nature ==
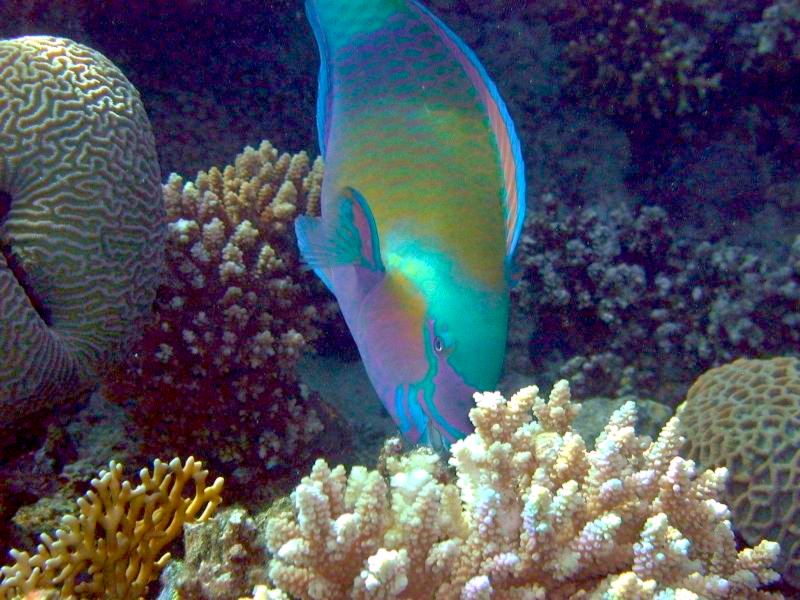
Parrotfish eating coral in the Red Sea

Corallivory is relatively rare in nature; less than 3% of known fish species, four families of crustaceans, four families of gastropods, and a few echinoderm genera have been identified as corallivores. Corallivores are present in all tropical reef regions. The region with the highest proportion of corallivorous organisms is the tropical eastern Pacific Ocean.

=== Fish ===
Butterflyfish constitute a large percentage of the known corallivores; of the 128 known corallivorous fish species, 69 are butterflyfish species. Additionally, 50% of butterflyfish species are corallivores, making corallivory their most common feeding method. Corallivorous fish come from 11 different families. 39 species are obligate corallivores.

Butterflyfish have a wide range of adaptations that facilitate coral consumption. Some butterflyfish have long mouth that they use like forceps to pluck off individual coral polyps and some use their teeth to scrape off coral tissue. Butterflyfish that consume coral have longer intestines than fish that do not consume coral, suggesting that corallivores need more time to process the complex molecules of the coral.

The golden pufferfish is distributed widely across the tropical oceans, however, is considered a particularly significant corallivore, specifically in the tropical Eastern Pacific. The golden pufferfish uses its beak-like dental plate to feed on the tips of branching corals at an estimated pace of 16 to 20 grams (0.56 to 0.71 oz) of calcium carbonate per 1 square meter (11 ft^{2}) of live coral per day. Despite the large amount of coral consumed, studies suggest that the golden pufferfish has little influence on coral abundance in the region.

Parrotfish are a family of fish that contain several corallivorous species. Reef-dwelling parrotfish have teeth on their lower and upper jaw that have evolved into an edge for cutting. This cutting edge allows parrotfish to scrape and feed on coral tissue and skeleton. The cutting edge on the teeth of parrotfish resembles a beak, which is the basis for the organism's common name. In addition to the cutting edge adaptation, parrotfish also have well-developed crossed joints that connect the dentary and articular bones of the lower jaw, which presents a mechanical advantage that makes the bite much stronger.

=== Invertebrates ===
There are 48 known corallivorous invertebrate species, 14 of which are obligate corallivores. The facultative corallivore crown-of-thorns star is an important coral browser that feeds by everting its stomach and using its tube feet to spread the stomach over the coral and into the crevices between polyps. Occurrences of high crown-of-thorns star population densities has resulted in documented decimation of large coral reef tracts, with reports of 100% coral mortality in localized areas. It is estimated that one crown-of-thorns star may eat up to 6 square meters (65 ft^{2}) of live coral per year.

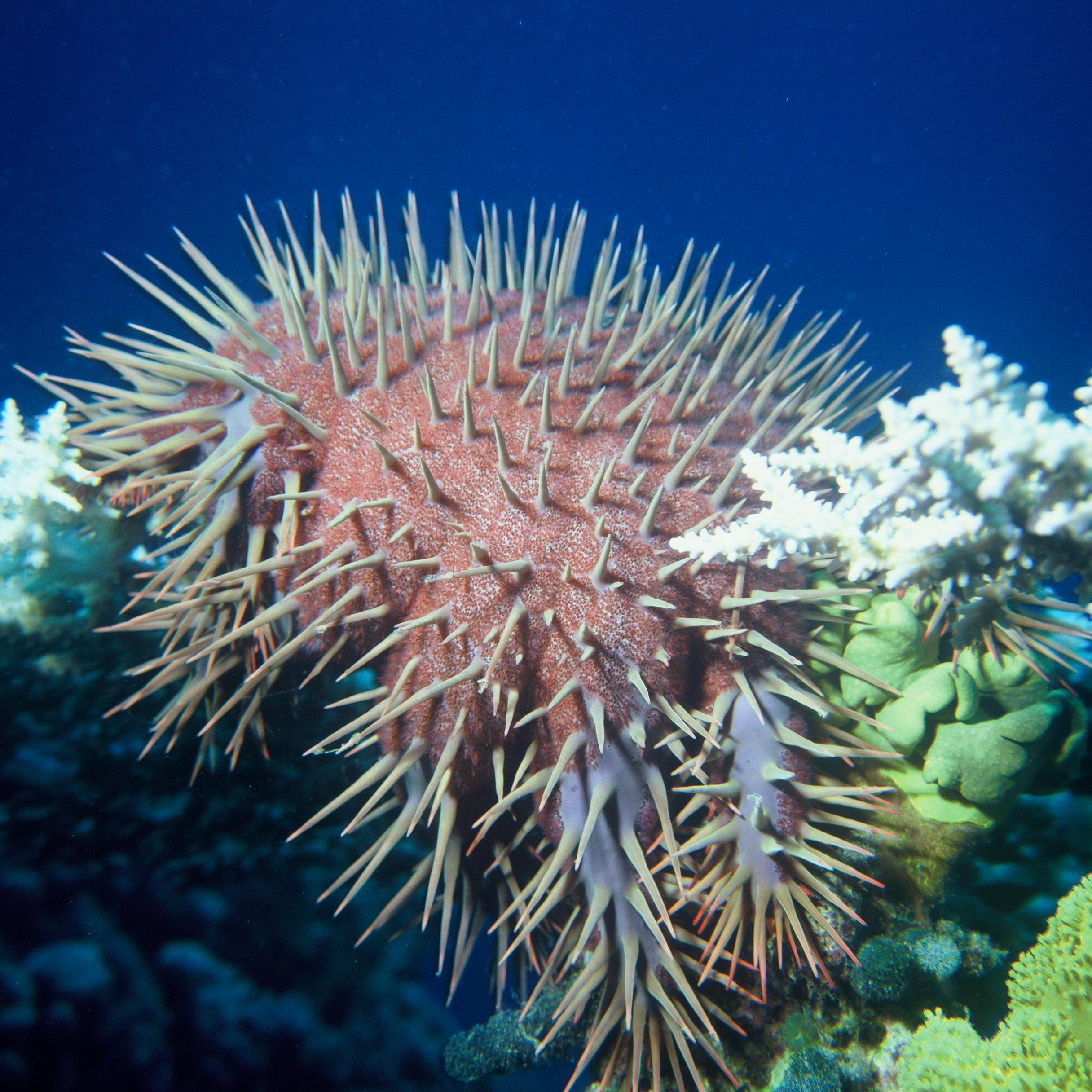
Crown-of-thorns star on coral in the Red Sea

The genus Drupella are obligate corallivorous sea snails that specialize on fast growing Acropora and Montipora species. Like crown-of-thorns star, Drupella aggregations have been known to destroy large areas of coral, and have been cited as the cause for instances of significant coral reduction in Toga Bay, Japan, and Ningaloo Reef, Australia.

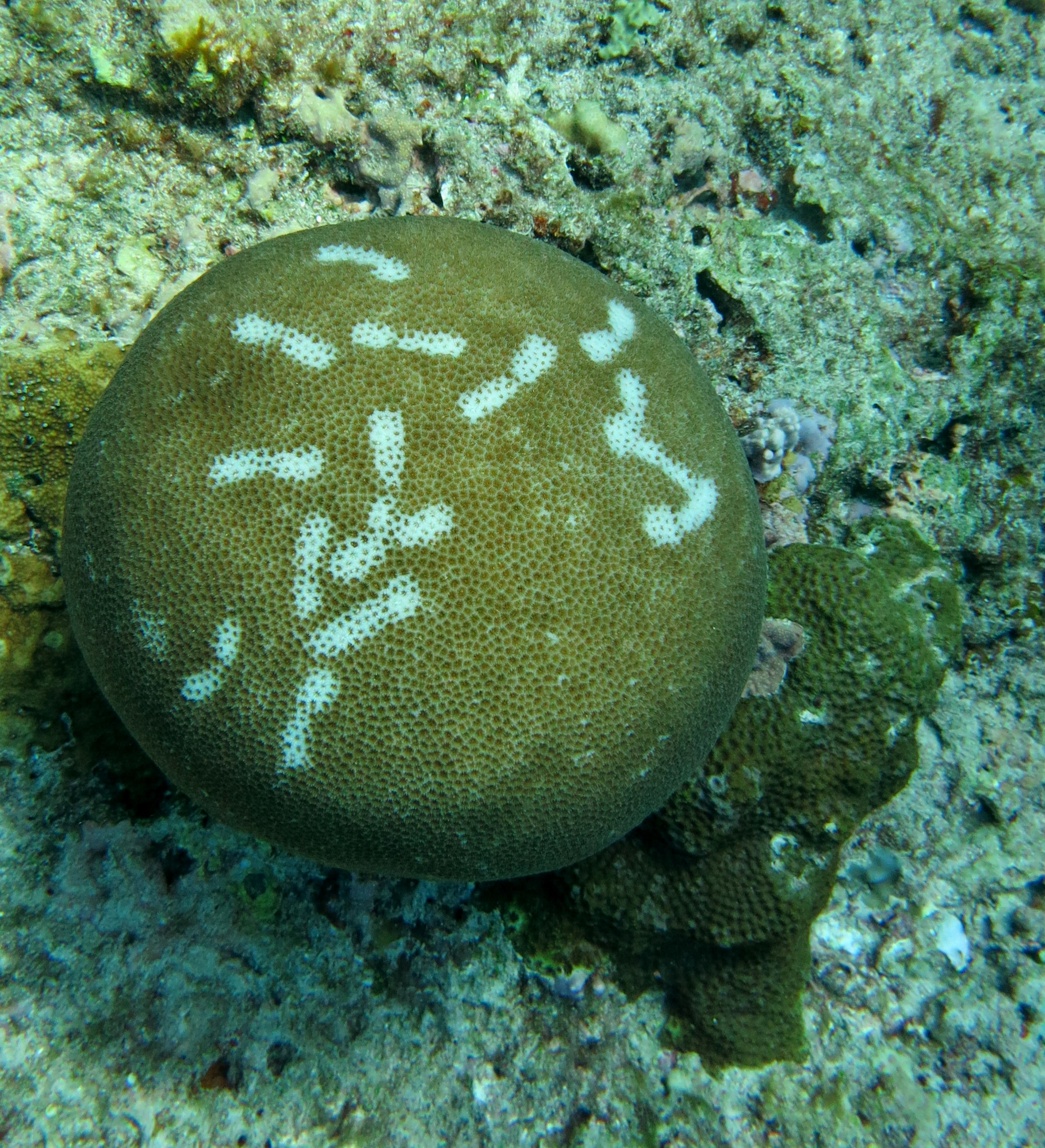
Scars from parrotfish spot biting

Most corallivores display a preference for one or a few types of coral. However, the obligate corallivore snail, Coralliophila abbreviata, is known to feed on 26 different species of coral and shows no distinct preference for one species. C. abbreviata lacks a radula that would allow it to scrape off coral tissue, so coral is broken down by digestive enzymes.

Not all corallivores are detrimental to coral health. Corals with populations of the mucus feeding Tetralia and Trapezia crabs were shown to have a greater chance of survival during a crown-of-thorns star outbreak. Trapezia crabs are known to symbiotically benefit their host coral by cleaning sediment and debris off their surface.

Some organisms receive more than nutrition. The nudibranch, Phestilla sibogae, has been known to incorporate zooxanthellae, a phytoplankton symbiont, harvested through corallivory into its cerata. After they are incorporated, the zooxanthellae continue to photosynthesize and provide energy for the nudibranch.

== Impacts on ecosystem ==
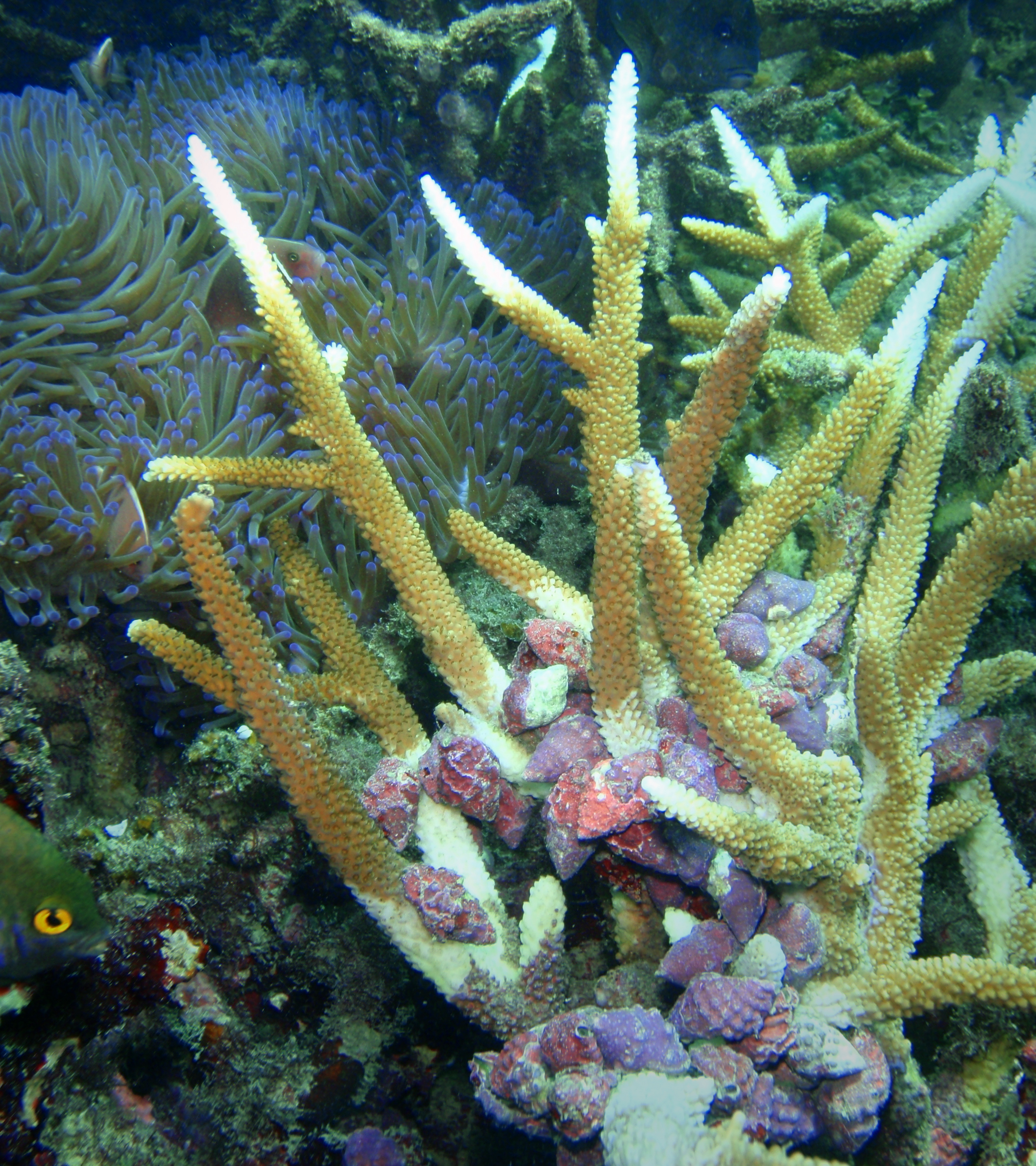
Group of Drupella snails feeding on Acropora in Thailand

Corallivory often results in damage to coral or loss of coral biomass, and sometime directly causes coral death. Corals divert energy and resources towards repairing damage, which has shown to suppress additional growth. The ability for a coral to repair itself is partially based on the size of the lesion; since not all damage can be healed, superfluous damage can result in permanent change to the reef. Corals have shown to energetically prioritize repairing damage over reproducing, so corallivory can have a negative effect on coral reproduction. Additionally, studies have shown that grazing by corallivores can be associated with reduced zooxanthellae densities.

Scientists believe that excessive fishing of predators to corallivores, like large piscivorous fish, may result in an increase in corallivore abundance. This increase in corallivory may have a future negative effect on coral health and density.

Corallivory can indirectly cause an increase in growth of competitive organisms, such as algae and sponges. Additionally, some corallivores have been implicated in the spread of coral diseases. Some studies have shown that corallivores can have an influence on the competitive abilities of coral colonies.

Corallivory is not always detrimental to coral reefs. If the species of coral being consumed is spatially dominant, grazing can help control growth and promote greater reef diversity.

Corallivores are often sensitive to declines in coral health and population size, and are negatively affected during periods of high coral loss. In particular, obligate corallivores have been reported to experience high population declines following instances of coral loss. Studies have shown that corallivores suffer during bleaching events, suggesting that bleached coral is not as nutritional as healthy coral. Scientific investigation into the nutritional value of healthy and bleached coral is lacking. However, it has been determined that the disparity in nutritional value is not related to the concentration of zooxanthellae.

== Known corallivores ==
This list contains the majority of known corallivores, as research is actively ongoing.

Phylum	Family	Species	Diet (Obligate or Facultative)	Preferred Prey	Region	Evidence of Corallivory
Annelida	Amphinomidae	Hermodice carunculata	Facultative	Acropora, Millepora, Oculina, Porites	Caribbeans, Eastern Atlantic, Mediterranean	
Arthropoda	Alpheidae	Alpheus lottini	Facultative	Pocillopora	Red Sea, Eastern Pacific	
Arthropoda	Diogenidae	Aniculus elegans	Facultative	Pocillopora	Eastern Pacific	
Arthropoda	Diogenidae	Calcinus obscurus			Eastern Pacific	
Arthropoda	Diogenidae	Trizopagurus magnificus	Facultative	Pocillopora	Eastern Pacific	
Arthropoda	Pyrgomatidae	Hoekia monticulariae	Obligate		Indo-Pacific	
Arthropoda	Tetraliidae	Tetralia glaberrima	Obligate	Acropora, Seriatopora	Red Sea, Indo-Pacific	
Arthropoda	Tetraliidae	Tetralia cavimana	Obligate	Acropora	Red Sea, Indo-Pacific	
Arthropoda	Trapeziidae	Trapezia cymodoce	Obligate	Pocillopora, Stylophora	Indo-Pacific, Eastern Pacific	
Arthropoda	Trapeziidae	Trapezia ferruginea	Obligate	Pocillopora	Indo-Pacific, Eastern Pacific	
Chordata	Balistidae	Balistapus undulatus	Facultative	Pavona, Pocillopora, Porites	Red Sea, Indo-Pacific	Gut contents
Chordata	Balistidae	Balistoides viridescens	Facultative		Red Sea, Indo-Pacific	Anecdotal
Chordata	Balistidae	Rhinecanthus aculeatus	Facultative		Indo-Pacific	Gut contents
Chordata	Balistidae	Melichthys niger	Facultative	Colpolphyllia	All tropical oceans	Gut contents
Chordata	Balistidae	Pseudobalistes flavimarginatus	Facultative		Red Sea, Indo-Pacific	Anecdotal
Chordata	Balistidae	Pseudobalistes naufragium	Facultative		Eastern Pacific	Anecdotal
Chordata	Balistidae	Sufflamen fraenatum	Facultative	Pocillopora, Porites, Pavona	Indo-Pacific	Gut contents
Chordata	Blennidae	Ecsenius bicolor	Facultative		Indo-Pacific	Observation
Chordata	Blennidae	Exallias brevis	Obligate	Acropora	Indo-Pacific	Gut contents
Chordata	Chaetodontidae	Chaetodon adiergastos	Facultative		Western Pacific	Anecdotal
Chordata	Chaetodontidae	Chaetodon andamanensis	Obligate		Eastern Indian	Anecdotal
Chordata	Chaetodontidae	Chaetodon argentatus	Facultative		Western Pacific	Gut contents
Chordata	Chaetodontidae	Chaetodon aureofasciatus	Obligate		Indo-Pacific	Observations
Chordata	Chaetodontidae	Chaetodon auriga	Facultative		Red Sea, Indo-Pacific	Gut contents
Chordata	Chaetodontidae	Chaetodon auripes	Facultative		Western Pacific	Gut contents
Chordata	Chaetodontidae	Chaetodon austriacus	Obligate		Red Sea	Gut contents
Chordata	Chaetodontidae	Chaetodon baronessa	Obligate		Eastern Pacific	Gut contents
Chordata	Chaetodontidae	Chaetodon bennetti	Obligate		Indo-Pacific	Gut contents
Chordata	Chaetodontidae	Chaetodon blackburnii	Facultative		Indian	Anecdotal
Chordata	Chaetodontidae	Chaetodon capistratus	Facultative		Caribbean	Gut contents
Chordata	Chaetodontidae	Chaetodon citrinellus	Facultative		Indo-Pacific	Gut contents
Chordata	Chaetodontidae	Chaetodon collare	Facultative		Red Sea, Indian	Anecdotal
Chordata	Chaetodontidae	Chaetodon daedalma	Facultative		Northwestern Pacific	Gut contents
Chordata	Chaetodontidae	Chaetodon decussatus	Facultative		Indian	Anecdotal
Chordata	Chaetodontidae	Chaetodon ephippium	Facultative		Indo-Pacific	Gut contents
Chordata	Chaetodontidae	Chaetodon falcula	Facultative		Indian	Observations
Chordata	Chaetodontidae	Chaetodon fasciatus	Facultative		Red Sea	Gut contents
Chordata	Chaetodontidae	Chaetodon flavirostris	Facultative		Pacific	Anecdotal
Chordata	Chaetodontidae	Chaetodon fremblii	Facultative		Hawaii	Anecdotal
Chordata	Chaetodontidae	Chaetodon gardineri	Facultative		Western Indian	Anecdotal
Chordata	Chaetodontidae	Chaetodon guttatissimus	Facultative		Indian	Anecdotal
Chordata	Chaetodontidae	Chaetodon interruptus	Facultative		Indian	Anecdotal
Chordata	Chaetodontidae	Chaetodon kleinii	Facultative		Indo-Pacific	Gut contents
Chordata	Chaetodontidae	Chaetodon larvatus	Obligate		Red Sea	Gut contents
Chordata	Chaetodontidae	Chaetodon leucopleura	Facultative		Western Indian	Anecdotal
Chordata	Chaetodontidae	Chaetodon lineolatus	Facultative		Indo-Pacific	Anecdotal
Chordata	Chaetodontidae	Chaetodon lunula	Facultative		Indo-Pacific	Gut contents
Chordata	Chaetodontidae	Chaetodon lunulatus	Obligate		Indo-Pacific	Gut contents
Chordata	Chaetodontidae	Chaetodon melannotus	Obligate		Red Sea, Indo-Pacific	Gut contents
Chordata	Chaetodontidae	Chaetodon melapterus	Obligate		Red Sea	Gut contents
Chordata	Chaetodontidae	Chaetodon mertensii	Facultative		Indo-Pacific	Gut contents
Chordata	Chaetodontidae	Chaetodon mesoleucos	Facultative		Red Sea	Gut contents
Chordata	Chaetodontidae	Chaetodon meyeri	Obligate		Indo-Pacific	Gut contents
Chordata	Chaetodontidae	Chaetodon multicinctus	Obligate		Hawaii	Gut contents
Chordata	Chaetodontidae	Chaetodon nigropunctatus	Facultative		Red Sea	Anecdotal
Chordata	Chaetodontidae	Chaetodon nippon	Facultative		Pacific	Gut contents
Chordata	Chaetodontidae	Chaetodon ocellatus	Facultative		Caribbean	Anecdotal
Chordata	Chaetodontidae	Chaetodon ocellicaudus	Obligate		Western Pacific	Anecdotal
Chordata	Chaetodontidae	Chaetodon octofasciatus	Obligate		Indo-Pacific	Anecdotal
Chordata	Chaetodontidae	Chaetodon ornatissimus	Obligate		Indo-Pacific	Gut contents
Chordata	Chaetodontidae	Chaetodon oxycephalus	Facultative		Indo-Pacific	Anecdotal
Chordata	Chaetodontidae	Chaetodon paucifasciatus	Facultative		Red Sea	Gut contents
Chordata	Chaetodontidae	Chaetodon pelewensis	Facultative		Indo-Pacific	Gut contents
Chordata	Chaetodontidae	Chaetodon plebeius	Obligate		Indo-Pacific	Gut contents
Chordata	Chaetodontidae	Chaetodon punctatofasciatus	Obligate		Indo-Pacific	Gut contents
Chordata	Chaetodontidae	Chaetodon quadrimaculatus	Facultative		Indo-Pacific	Gut contents
Chordata	Chaetodontidae	Chaetodon rafflesi	Facultative		Indo-Pacific	Gut contents
Chordata	Chaetodontidae	Chaetodon rainfordi	Obligate		Western Pacific	Observations
Chordata	Chaetodontidae	Chaetodon reticulatus	Obligate		Pacific	Gut contents
Chordata	Chaetodontidae	Chaetodon semilarvatus	Obligate		Red Sea	Gut contents
Chordata	Chaetodontidae	Chaetodon speculum	Facultative		Indo-Pacific	Gut contents
Chordata	Chaetodontidae	Chaetodon triangulum	Obligate		Indian	Anecdotal
Chordata	Chaetodontidae	Chaetodon tricinctus	Facultative		Lord Howels	Observations
Chordata	Chaetodontidae	Chaetodon trichrous	Facultative		Society Islands	Observations
Chordata	Chaetodontidae	Chaetodon trifascialis	Obligate		Red Sea, Indo-Pacific	Gut contents
Chordata	Chaetodontidae	Chaetodon trifasciatus	Obligate		Indian	Gut contents
Chordata	Chaetodontidae	Chaetodon ulientensis	Facultative		Indo-Pacific	Gut contents
Chordata	Chaetodontidae	Chaetodon unimaculatus	Obligate		Indo-Pacific	Gut contents
Chordata	Chaetodontidae	Chaetodon vagabundus	Facultative		Red Sea, Indo-Pacific	Gut contents
Chordata	Chaetodontidae	Chaetodon xanthocephalus	Facultative		Indian	Gut contents
Chordata	Chaetodontidae	Chaetodon xanthurus	Facultative		Pacific	Anecdotal
Chordata	Chaetodontidae	Chaetodon zanzibariensis	Obligate		Western Indian	Observations
Chordata	Chaetodontidae	Forcipiger flavissimus	Facultative		Red Sea, Indo-Pacific	Gut contents
Chordata	Chaetodontidae	Heniochus acuminatus	Facultative		Indo-Pacific	Anecdotal
Chordata	Chaetodontidae	Heniochus chrysostomus	Facultative		Indo-Pacific	Gut contents
Chordata	Chaetodontidae	Heniochus intermedius	Facultative		Red Sea	Gut contents
Chordata	Chaetodontidae	Heniochus singularius	Obligate		Indo-Pacific	Gut contents
Chordata	Chaetodontidae	Heniochus varius	Facultative		Pacific	Gut contents
Chordata	Gobiidae	Gobiodon citrinus	Obligate	Acropora	Red Sea, Indo-Pacific	Gut contents
Chordata	Gobiidae	Gobiodon okinawae	Facultative		Western Pacific	Gut contents
Chordata	Gobiidae	Paragobidon echinocephalus	Facultative		Indo-Pacific	Anecdotal
Chordata	Labridae	Diproctacanthus xanthurus	Obligate		Western Pacific	Observations
Chordata	Labridae	Labrichthys unilineatus	Obligate	Acropora, Montipora	Indo-Pacific	Gut contents
Chordata	Labridae	Labropsis alleni	Obligate		Western Pacific	Observations
Chordata	Labridae	Labropsis australis	Obligate		Western Pacific	Anecdotal
Chordata	Labridae	Labropsis manabei	Obligate		Indo-Pacific	Anecdotal
Chordata	Labridae	Labropsis micronesica	Facultative		Western Pacific	Anecdotal
Chordata	Labridae	Labropsis polynesica	Facultative		Eastern Pacific	Anecdotal
Chordata	Labridae	Labropsis xanthonota	Obligate		Indo-Pacific	Anecdotal
Chordata	Labridae	Larabicus quadrilineatus	Obligate		Red Sea	Observations
Chordata	Labridae	Choerodon graphicus	Facultative		Southwestern Pacific	Gut contents
Chordata	Monacanthidae	Aluterus scriptus	Facultative		All tropical oceans	Gut contents
Chordata	Monacanthidae	Cantherhines dumerilii	Obligate	Acropora, Pocillopora, Montipora, Leptoria, Porites	Indo-Pacific	Gut contents
Chordata	Monacanthidae	Cantherhines macrocerus	Facultative		Caribbeans	Gut contents
Chordata	Monacanthidae	Cantherhines pullus	Facultative		Caribbeans	Gut contents
Chordata	Monacanthidae	Cantherhines sandwichiensis	Facultative		Eastern Pacific	Anecdotal
Chordata	Monacanthidae	Oxymonacanthus halli	Obligate		Red Sea	Anecdotal
Chordata	Monacanthidae	Oxymonacanthus longirostris	Obligate	Acropora	Indo-Pacific	Gut contents
Chordata	Monacanthidae	Pervagor spilosoma	Facultative		Hawaii	Gut contents
Chordata	Ostraciidae	Ostracion cubicus	Facultative		Red Sea, Indo-Pacific	Gut contents
Chordata	Ostraciidae	Lactoria diaphana	Facultative		Indo-Pacific	Gut contents
Chordata	Pomacanthidae	Centropyge multispinus	Facultative		Indo-Pacific	Anecdotal
Chordata	Pomacanthidae	Pomacanthus arcuatus	Facultative		Caribbeans	Anecdotal
Chordata	Pomacentridae	Cheiloprion labiatus	Obligate	Acropora	Indo-Pacific	Gut contents
Chordata	Pomacentridae	Neoglyphidodon melas	Facultative		Red Seas, Indo-Pacific	Gut contents
Chordata	Pomacentridae	Microspathodon chrysurus	Facultative		Caribbeans	Gut contents
Chordata	Pomacentridae	Plectroglyphidodon dickii	Facultative	Acropora, Pocillopora	Indo-Pacific	Gut contents
Chordata	Pomacentridae	Plectroglyphidodon johnstonianus	Obligate	Acropora	Indo-Pacific	Gut contents
Chordata	Pomacentridae	Stegastes acapulcoensis	Facultative		Eastern Pacific	Anecdotal
Chordata	Pomacentridae	Stegastes leucostictus	Facultative		Caribbeans	Gut contents
Chordata	Pomacentridae	Stegastes variabilis	Facultative		Caribbeans	Gut contents
Chordata	Scaridae	Bolbometopon muricatum	Facultative	Acropora, Pocillopora, Porites, Montipora	Red Sea, Indo-Pacific	Observations
Chordata	Scaridae	Cetoscarus bicolor	Facultative	Porites	Indo-Pacific	Observations
Chordata	Scaridae	Chlorurus microrhinos	Facultative		Indo-Pacific	Observations
Chordata	Scaridae	Chlorurus strongylocephalus	Facultative	Pavona, Pocillopora, Porites	Indian	Observations
Chordata	Scaridae	Sparisoma aurofrenatum	Facultative	Montastraea, Porites, Madracis	Caribbeans	Anecdotal
Chordata	Scaridae	Sparisoma viride	Facultative	Porites, Montastraea	Caribbeans	Observations
Chordata	Scaridae	Scarus coelestinus	Facultative		Caribbeans	Gut contents
Chordata	Scaridae	Scarus guacamaia	Facultative		Caribbeans	Observations
Chordata	Tetraodontidae	Arothron hispidus	Facultative	Pocillopora	Red Sea, Indo-Pacific	Gut contents
Chordata	Tetraodontidae	Arothron meleagris	Obligate	Acropora, Pocillopora, Porites, Pavona, Psammocora, Montipora	Indo-Pacific	Gut contents
Chordata	Tetraodontidae	Arothron nigropunctatus	Obligate	Acropora, Pavona, Pocillpora, Porites	Indo-Pacific	Gut contents
Chordata	Tetraodontidae	Arothron reticularis	Facultative		Indo-Pacific	Anecdotal
Chordata	Tetraodontidae	Arothron stellatus	Facultative		Red Sea, Indo-Pacific	Anecdotal
Chordata	Tetraodontidae	Canthigaster amboinensis	Facultative		Indo-Pacific	Gut contents
Chordata	Tetraodontidae	Canthigaster margaritata	Facultative		Red Sea, Indo-Pacific	Anecdotal
Chordata	Tetraodontidae	Canthigaster solandri	Facultative		Indo-Pacific	Gut contents
Chordata	Tetraodontidae	Canthigaster valentine	Facultative	Pavona, Pocillopora, Porites	Red Sea, Indo-Pacific	Observations
Echinodermata	Acanthasteridae	Acanthaster planci	Facultative	Acropora, Montipora, Pocillopora	Indo-Pacific, Eastern Pacific	
Echinodermata	Cidaridae	Eucidaris thouarsii	Facultative	Pavona, Pocillopora	Eastern Pacific	
Echinodermata	Diadematidae	Astropyga radiata	Facultative		Eastern Indian	
Echinodermata	Diadematidae	Diadema antillarum	Facultative	Acropora, Agaricia, Madracis, Montastraea, Porites	Caribbeans	
Echinodermata	Diadematidae	Diadema setosum	Facultative		Eastern Indian	
Echinodermata	Diadematidae	Echinothrix calamaris	Facultative		Eastern Indian	
Echinodermata	Echinasteridae	Echinaster purpureus	Facultative	Porites	Western Indian	
Echinodermata	Echinometridae	Echinometra mathaei	Facultative		Indo-Pacific, Caribbeans	
Echinodermata	Echinometridae	Echinometra viridis	Facultative		Caribbeans	
Echinodermata	Echinoneidae	Echinoneus cyclostomus	Facultative		Western Indian	
Echinodermata	Ophidiasteridae	Linckia laevigata	Facultative	Porites	Western Indian, Indo-Pacific	
Echinodermata	Ophidiasteridae	Nardoa variolata	Facultative	Porites	Western Indian	
Echinodermata	Ophidiasteridae	Pharia pyramidata	Facultative	Pocillopora	Eastern Pacific	
Echinodermata	Oreasteridae	Culcita novaeguineae	Facultative	Acropora, Pocillpora	Indo-Pacific	
Echinodermata	Oreasteridae	Culcita schmideliana	Facultative	Acropora, Galaxea, Goniastrea	Western Indian	
Echinodermata	Oreasteridae	Nidorellia armata	Facultative	Pavona	Eastern Pacific	
Echinodermata	Oreasteridae	Pentaceraster cumingi	Facultative	Psammocora	Eastern Pacific	
Echinodermata	Temnopleuridae	Microcyphus rousseaui	Facultative		Western Indian	
Echinodermata	Stomopneustidae	Stomopneustes variolaris	Facultative		Western Indian	
Echinodermata	Stomopneustidae	Tripneustes gratillia	Facultative		Western Indian	
Mollusca	Architectonicidae	Psilaxis radiatus	Facultative	Porites	Pacific	
Mollusca	Epitoniidae	Epifungium ulu		Fungia	Pacific	
Mollusca	Muricidae	Babelomurex hindsi		Pocillopora	Eastern Pacific	
Mollusca	Muricidae	Coralliophila galea	Obligate	No preference shown	Caribbeans	
Mollusca	Muricidae	Coralliophila violacea		Porites	Indo-Pacific	
Mollusca	Muricidae	Coralliophila caribaea		Acropora, Porites	Caribbeans	
Mollusca	Muricidae	Coralliophila monodonta	Obligate	Montipora, Pocillopora, Porites, Seriatopora, Stylophora	Indo-Pacific, Eastern Pacific	
Mollusca	Muricidae	Drupella cornus	Obligate	Acropora, Montipora, Pocillopora, Porites, Seriatopora, Stylophora	Red Sea, Indo-Pacific	
Mollusca	Muricidae	Drupella elata	Obligate	Acropora, Montipora, Pocillopora, Porites	Indo-Pacific	
Mollusca	Muricidae	Drupella fragum	Obligate	Acropora, Montipora, Pocillopora, Porites, Seriatopora, Stylophora	Indo-Pacific	
Mollusca	Muricidae	Drupella rugosa	Obligate	Acropora, Montipora, Pocillopora, Porites, Seriatopora, Stylophora	Indo-Pacific	
Mollusca	Muricidae	Morula spinosa				
Mollusca	Muricidae	Muricopsis zeteki		Pocillopora	Eastern Pacific	
Mollusca	Ovulidae	Jenneria pustulata	Obligate	Pocillopora, Porites, Siderastrea	Eastern Pacific	
Mollusca	Ovulidae	Pedicularia decussata		Solenastrea	Caribbeans	
Mollusca	Trinchesiidae	Phestilla sibogae	Obligate	Porites	Pacific	
Mollusca	Trinchesiidae	Phestilla melanobrachia	Obligate	Turbinaria	Indo-Pacific	
Mollusca	Trinchesiidae	Phestilla minor	Obligate	Porites	Indo-Pacific	

== See also ==
- Parrotfish
- Pufferfish
- Butterflyfish
- Triggerfish
- Wrasse
- Damselfish
- Acanthaster planci
- Arothron meleagris
- Architectonicidae
- Epitoniidae
- Pediculariidae
- Muricidae
- Drupella
- Coralliophila
