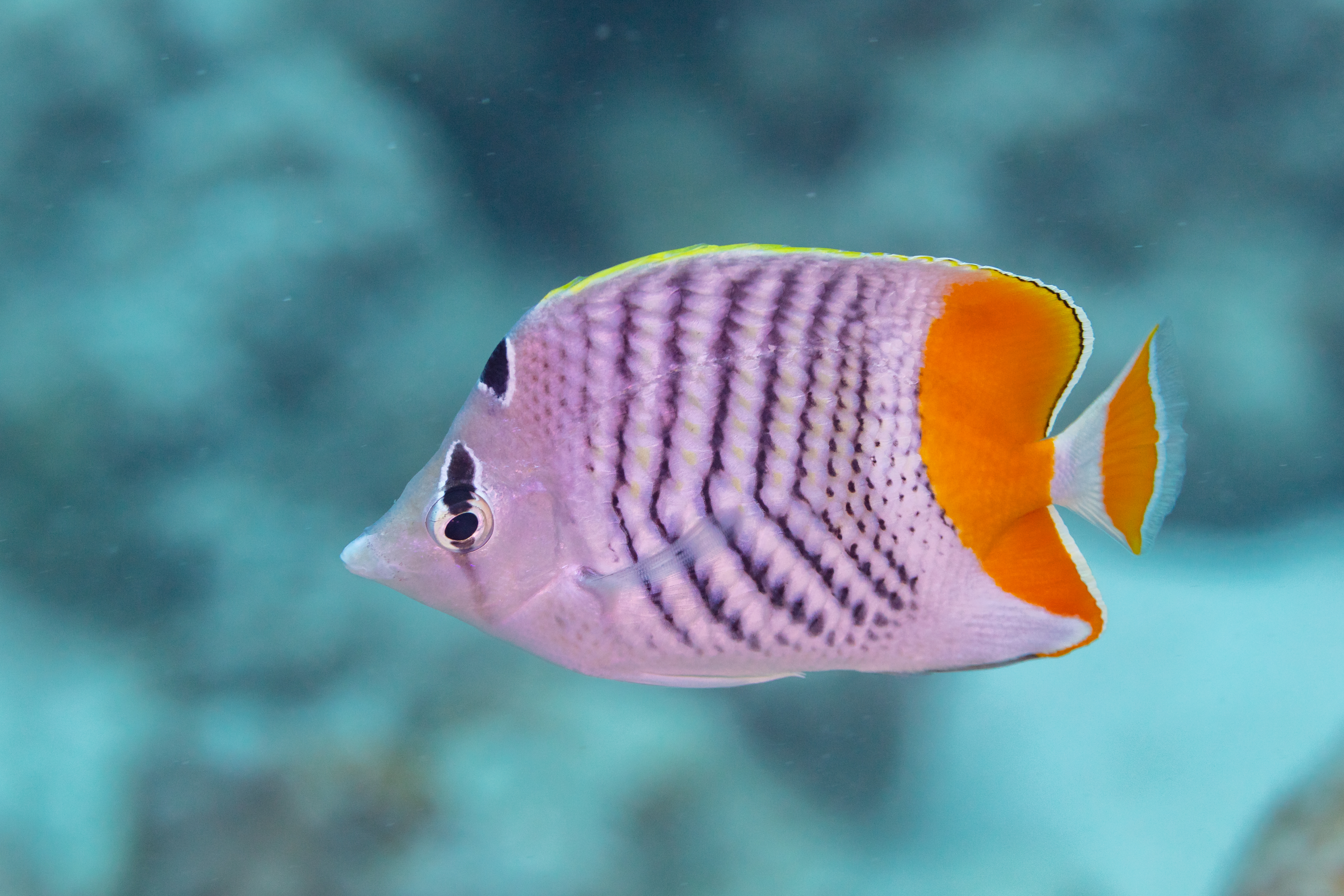

Conservation status
- Least Concern (IUCN 3.1)

Scientific classification
- Kingdom: Animalia
- Phylum: Chordata
- Class: Actinopterygii
- Order: Acanthuriformes
- Family: Chaetodontidae
- Genus: Chaetodon
- Subgenus: Rhombochaetodon
- Species: C. madagaskariensis

Binomial name
- Chaetodon madagaskariensis C. G. E. Ahl, 1923

Synonyms
- Chaetodon madagascariensis (lapsus)

= Seychelles butterflyfish =

Species of fish

The Seychelles butterflyfish (Chaetodon madagaskariensis) is a species of marine ray-finned fish, a butterflyfish belonging to the family Chaetodontidae. It is found in the Indian Ocean from eastern Africa (as far south as Port Elizabeth in South Africa) east to Cocos-Keeling Islands and Christmas Island, north to Sri Lanka. The Seychelles butterflyfish is found in areas of rich coral growth on seaward reefs, at 10–40 m depth.

It grows to a maximum of 13 cm (more than 5 in) long. The body color is silver at the head, becoming white towards the tail, with a triangular orange patch covering the posterior and the caudal peduncle. There are a series of dark grey chevron lines on the sides of the body, partly broken into spots. Between the eyes and the start of the dorsal fin there is a black patch rimmed with white. The base of the caudal fin is white, followed by an orange patch and a white rim.

== Systematics ==
The Seychelles butterflyfish was first formally described in 1923 by the German zoologist Ernst Ahl (1898-1945) with the type locality given as Mauritius. The specific name is sometimes spelt madagascarensis but Ahl's original should be used.

C. madagaskariensis is one of the "crowned" butterflyfishes. These form a group of largely allopatric species sharing the overall color pattern of dark forward-pointing chevrons on silvery hues, (usually) a black-and-white crown spot and yellow to red hindparts to a stunning degree; they differ in the exact combination of hues and some small pattern details. Other members of this lineage are the closely related Eritrean (C. paucifasciatus) and atoll butterflyfishes (C. mertensii), and the more distant pearlscale butterflyfish (C. xanthurus).

The "crowned" Chaetodon are a clearly recognizable clade, but their further relationships are otherwise less clear. They were often placed in the subgenus Exornator, or considered a distinct subgenus Rhombochaetodon. According to various DNA sequence studies, some older and more singular lineages. These include species such as the Asian butterflyfish (C. argentatus), the blue-striped butterflyfish (C. fremblii) and Burgess' butterflyfish (C. burgessi). C. burgessi is in fact so peculiar that it was placed in a monotypic subgenus Roaops. But recognition of this would probably result in several other small or monotypic subgenera becoming justified, and the older Rhombochaetodon would be the more conveniently apply to the entire radiation.

But the expanded group is of unclear relationships to species like the speckled butterflyfish (C. citrinellus) and the four-spotted butterflyfish (C. quadrimaculatus). These might be members of the subgenus Exornator – the lineages around the spot-banded butterflyfish (C. punctatofasciatus) – and C. citrinellus certainly looks somewhat similar to these. Yet phylogenetically, their position towards Rhombochaetodon is unresolved, and ultimately it might be better to merge both Rhombochaetodon and Roaops in Exornator. If the genus Chaetodon is split up, Exornator might become a subgenus of Lepidochaetodon or a separate genus.
