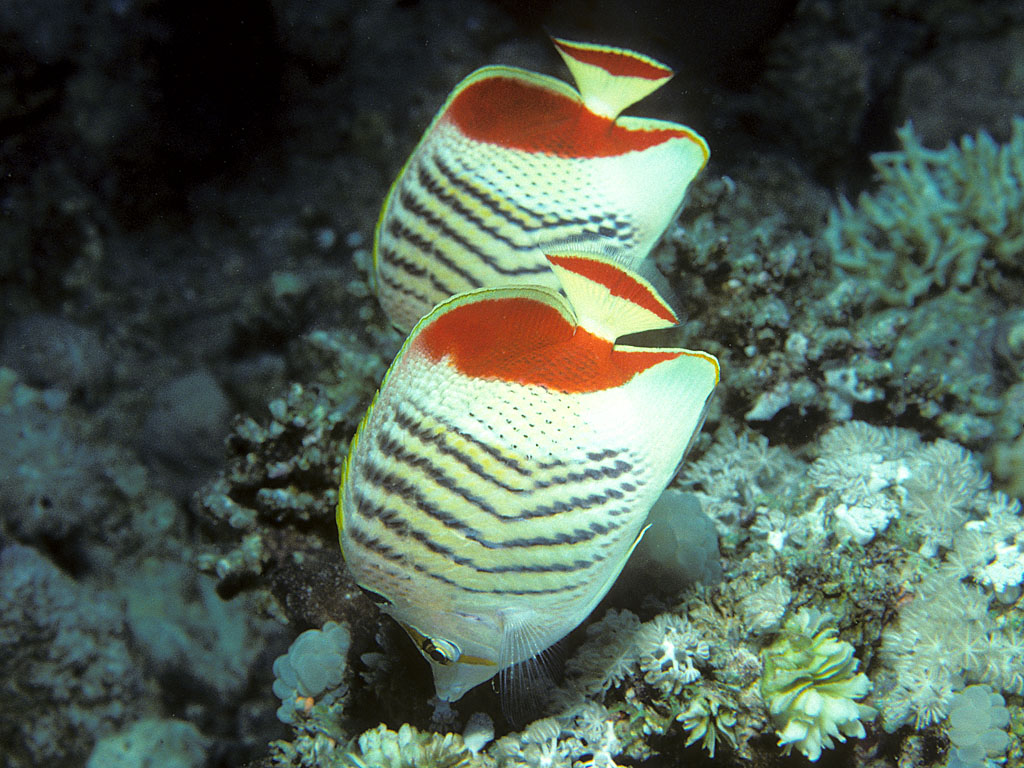

Conservation status
- Least Concern (IUCN 3.1)

Scientific classification
- Kingdom: Animalia
- Phylum: Chordata
- Class: Actinopterygii
- Division: Teleostei
- Order: Acanthuriformes
- Family: Chaetodontidae
- Genus: Chaetodon
- Subgenus: Rhombochaetodon
- Species: C. paucifasciatus

Binomial name
- Chaetodon paucifasciatus C. G. E. Ahl, 1923

Synonyms
- Chaetodon chrysurus paucifasciatus Ahl, 1923; Exornator rhombochaetodon paucifasciatus (Ahl, 1923)

= Eritrean butterflyfish =

Species of fish

The Eritrean butterflyfish or crown butterflyfish (Chaetodon paucifasciatus) is a species of marine ray-finned fish, a butterflyfish belonging to the family Chaetodontidae. It is essentially just known from the Red Sea and the Gulf of Aden, but has been reported from East Africa. It grows up to 14 cm (5.5 in) in length. It is white with black chevrons, except for a red zone stretching from the aft dorsal fin across the caudal peduncle to the end of the anal fin. A red bar runs vertically through the caudal fin. There are black eyestripes and a black "crown" with white border.

Eritrean butterflyfish are oviparous fish forming monogamous pairings during breeding. They are usually found in pairs or in small groups over coral and rubble areas from 1m to 30m depth. They feed on coral polyps, gorgonians, algae, polychaete worms and small crustaceans. This fish fares well in the aquarium and thus is sought after by hobbyists.

== Systematics ==
C. paucifasciatus is one of the "crowned" butterflyfishes. These form a group of largely allopatric species sharing the overall color pattern of dark forward-pointing chevrons on silvery hues, (usually) a black-and-white crown spot and yellow to red hindparts to a stunning degree; they differ in the exact combination of hues and some small pattern details. Other members of this lineage are the closely related Seychelles (C. madagaskariensis) and atoll butterflyfishes (C. mertensii), and the more distant pearlscale butterflyfish (C. xanthurus).

The "crowned" Chaetodon are a clearly recognizable clade, but their further relationships are otherwise less clear. They were often placed in the subgenus Exornator, or considered a distinct subgenus Rhombochaetodon. According to various DNA sequence studies, some older and more singular lineages. These include species such as the Asian butterflyfish (C. argentatus), the blue-striped butterflyfish (C. fremblii) and Burgess' butterflyfish (C. burgessi). C. burgessi is in fact so peculiar that it was placed in a monotypic subgenus Roaops. But recognition of this would probably result in several other small or monotypic subgenera becoming justified, and the older Rhombochaetodon would be the more conveniently apply to the entire radiation.

But the expanded group is of unclear relationships to species like the speckled butterflyfish (C. citrinellus) and the four-spotted butterflyfish (C. quadrimaculatus). These might be members of the subgenus Exornator – the lineages around the spot-banded butterflyfish (C. punctatofasciatus) – and C. citrinellus certainly looks somewhat similar to these. Yet phylogenetically, their position towards Rhombochaetodon is unresolved, and ultimately it might be better to merge both Rhombochaetodon and Roaops in Exornator. If the genus Chaetodon is split up, Exornator might become a subgenus of Lepidochaetodon or a separate genus.
