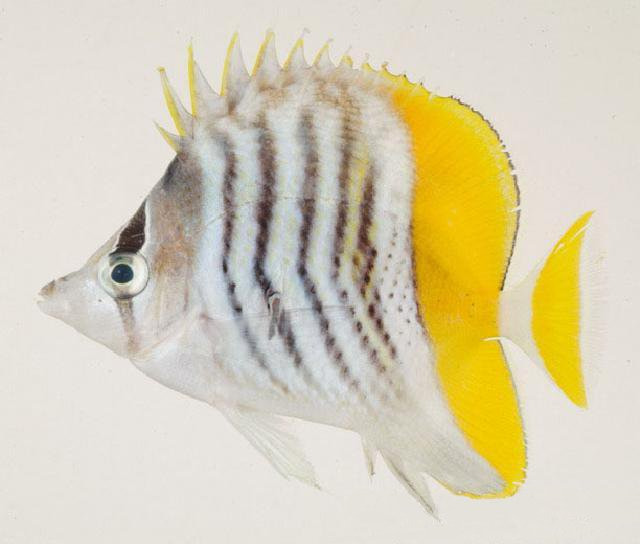

Conservation status
- Least Concern (IUCN 3.1)

Scientific classification
- Kingdom: Animalia
- Phylum: Chordata
- Class: Actinopterygii
- Division: Teleostei
- Order: Acanthuriformes
- Family: Chaetodontidae
- Genus: Chaetodon
- Subgenus: Rhombochaetodon
- Species: C. mertensii

Binomial name
- Chaetodon mertensii G. Cuvier, 1831

= Chaetodon mertensii =

Species of fish

Chaetodon mertensii, the atoll butterflyfish, yellowback butterflyfish or Merten's butterflyfish, is a species of marine ray finned fish, a butterflyfish belonging to the family Chaetodontidae. It is found in the western Pacific Ocean.

== Description ==
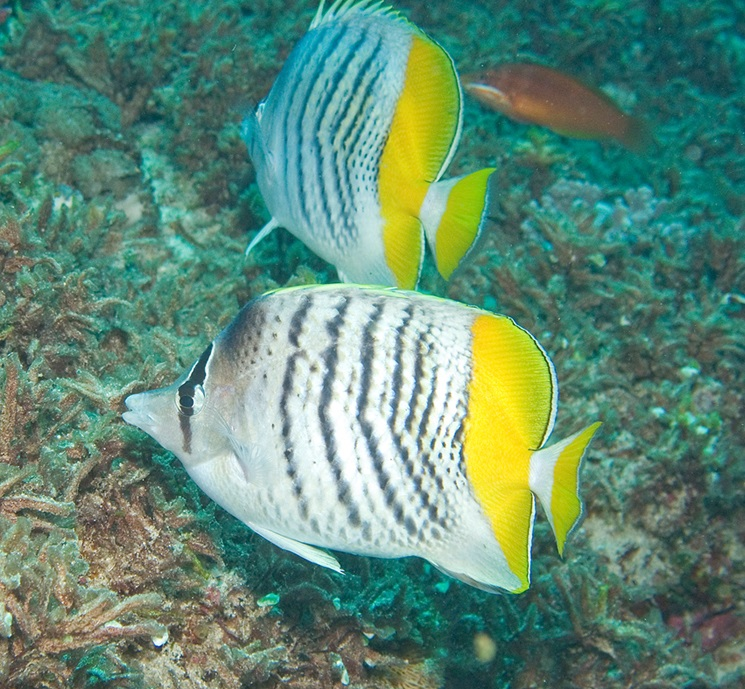
At Lord Howe Island, Australia

Chaetodon mertensi grows to a maximum of 12.5 cm (5 in) long. Body color is white with 5–7 chevron-shaped dark grey bands on the sides. The posterior portion of the trunk, the adjacent dorsal and anal fins, and the posterior portion of the caudal fin are orange or yellow. A vertical black bar runs across the eye and over the nape without a break; in the similar species there is a separate nape spot and eyestripe.

== Habitat and biology ==
Chaetodon mertensi is found in deep lagoons and seaward reefs at 10–120 m depth. It feeds on algae and small benthic invertebrates.

== Distribution ==
Chaetodon mertensii is found in the Pacific Ocean from the Ryukyu Islands to the Philippines and extending to Lord Howe Island, Rapa Iti and the Tuamotus. It was first recorded from the Kermadec Islands Marine Reserve north of New Zealand in 2015, after researchers examined hundreds of hours of unused documentary film footage.

== Systematics ==
Chaetodon mertensii was first formally described in 1831 by the French anatomist George's Cuvier (1769–1832). The specific name honours the German naturalist and explorer Karl Heinrich Mertens (1796–1830) who showed Cuvier an illustration of this fish.

Chaetodon mertensii is one of the "crowned" butterflyfishes. These form a group of largely allopatric species sharing the overall color pattern of dark forward-pointing chevrons on silvery hues, a (usually) black-and-white crown spot and yellow to red hindparts to a stunning degree; they differ in the exact combination of hues and some small pattern details. Other members of this lineage are the closely related Eritrean (C. paucifasciatus) and Seychelles butterflyfishes (C. madagaskariensis), and the more distant pearlscale butterflyfish (C. xanthurus).

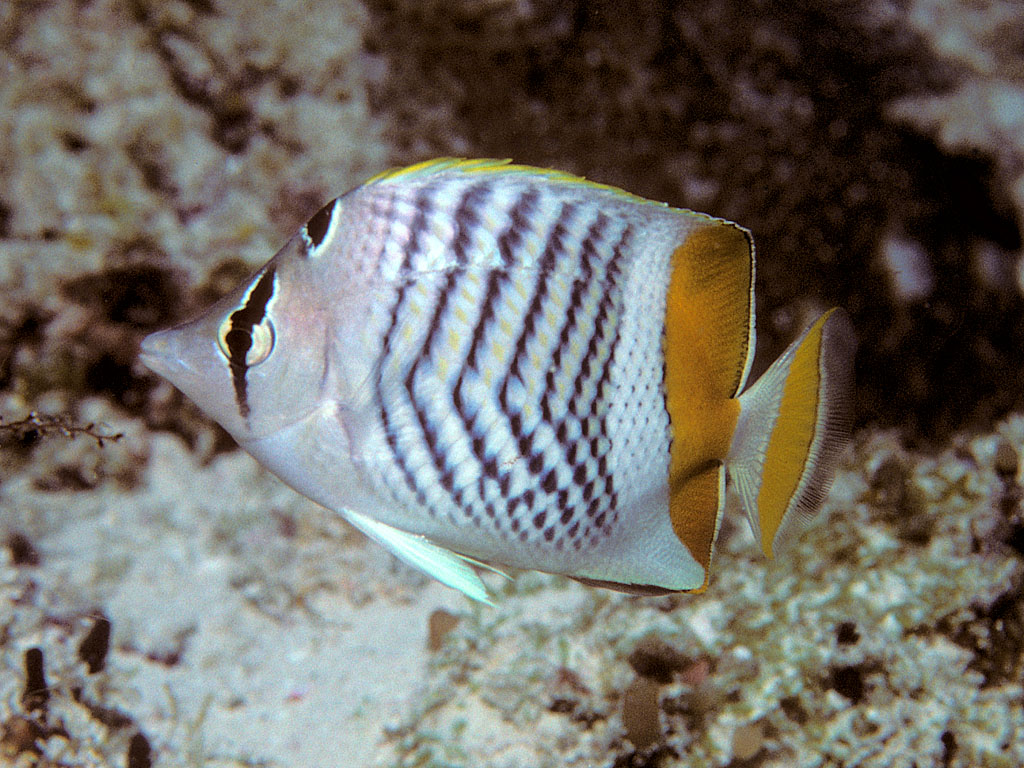
Seychelles butterflyfish (C. madagaskariensis). C. mertensii looks almost identical, save for yellower hindparts and a continuous head band.

The "crowned" Chaetodon are a clearly recognizable clade, but their further relationships are otherwise less clear. They were often placed in the subgenus Exornator, or considered a distinct subgenus Rhombochaetodon with the atoll butterflyfish as type species. According to various DNA sequence studies, some older and more singular lineages. These include species such as the Asian butterflyfish (C. argentatus), the blue-striped butterflyfish (C. fremblii) and Burgess' butterflyfish (C. burgessi). C. burgessi is in fact so peculiar that it was placed in a monotypic subgenus Roaops. But recognition of this would probably result in several other small or monotypic subgenera becoming justified, and the older Rhombochaetodon would be the more conveniently apply to the entire radiation.

But the expanded group is of unclear relationships to species like the speckled butterflyfish (C. citrinellus) and the four-spotted butterflyfish (C. quadrimaculatus). These might be members of the subgenus Exornator – the lineages around the spot-banded butterflyfish (C. punctatofasciatus) – and C. citrinellus certainly looks somewhat similar to these. Yet phylogenetically, their position towards Rhombochaetodon is unresolved, and ultimately it might be better to merge both Rhombochaetodon and Roaops in Exornator. If the genus Chaetodon is split up, Exornator might become a subgenus of Lepidochaetodon or a separate genus.
