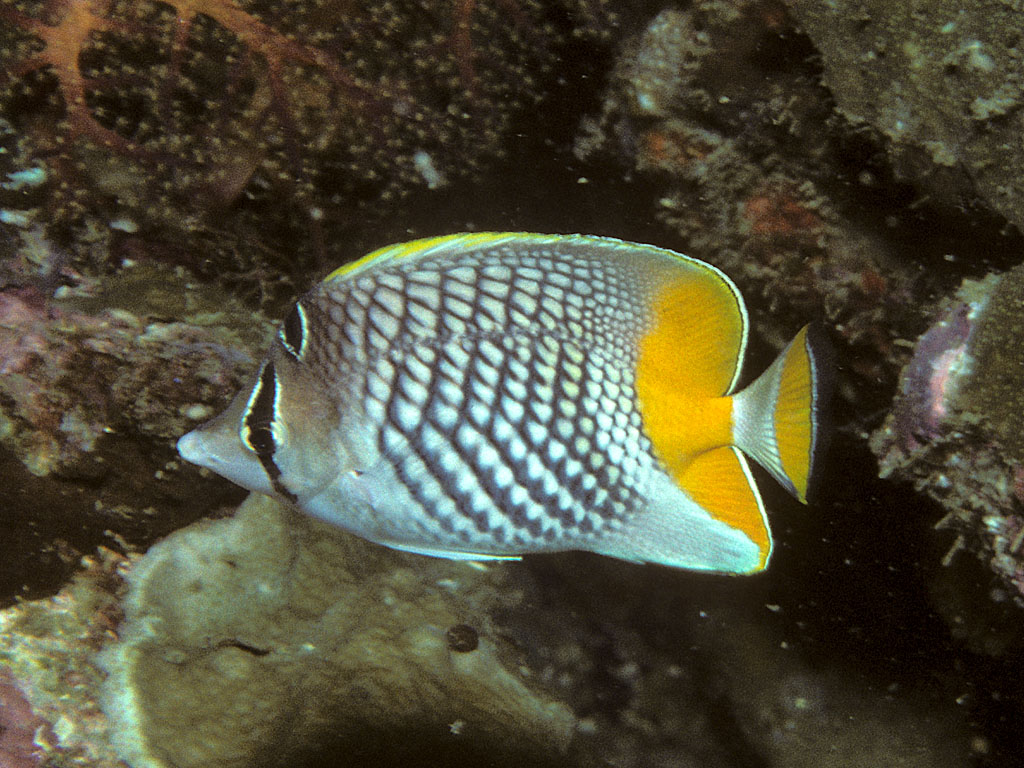

Conservation status
- Least Concern (IUCN 3.1)

Scientific classification
- Kingdom: Animalia
- Phylum: Chordata
- Class: Actinopterygii
- Division: Teleostei
- Order: Acanthuriformes
- Family: Chaetodontidae
- Genus: Chaetodon
- Subgenus: Rhombochaetodon
- Species: C. xanthurus

Binomial name
- Chaetodon xanthurus Bleeker, 1857

= Pearlscale butterflyfish =

Species of fish

The pearlscale butterflyfish (Chaetodon xanthurus), also known as yellow-tailed butterflyfish, crosshatch butterflyfish or Philippines chevron butterflyfish is a species of marine ray-finned fish, a butterflyfish belonging to the family Chaetodontidae.

== Description ==
Pearlscale butterflyfish can grow to a standard length of 15 centimetres (5.9 in) with no discernible differences between males and females. The body is pearly white and the scales have black edges, giving the sides a more cross-hatched pattern instead of the clear chevrons in related species. The hind parts are orangey-yellow, the base of the caudal fin is white. The head is darker than the body and bears the characteristic pattern of its lineage, consisting of vertical black eyestripes and a black white-rimmed crown spot.

== Distribution ==
The pearlscale butterflyfish is found on or around the reefs of the central Indo-Pacific region from Indonesia and the Philippines north to the Ryukyu Islands.

== Ecology in the wild and the aquarium ==
Pearlscale butterflyfish are a diurnal species and usually found at depths below 6 metres (20 ft). They are found in clear coastal to outer reef slopes and drop-offs, often around Acropora staghorn corals. These fish have a peaceful temperament and in the wild are found either alone, in pairs, or in small groups, however they are territorial towards similar-looking species and may harass them. Due to its attractive colors, the Pearlscale Butterflyfish is a well-known aquarium fish. A 50-gallon aquarium is the minimum size recommended for them, with a water temperature of between about 74 and 80° F. Although they can be aggressive at times, they are delicate and peaceful tankmates are required for this fish to thrive in an aquarium. They may be compatible with other butterflyfishes that have a different color pattern, but there is no guarantee that their relationship will always be peaceful. When adding more than one to a tank they have to be added simultaneously, and lots of "live rock" with shelters available for them to hide helps to reduce stress.

In the wild they feed on algae, soft coral polyps and small benthic invertebrates, so therefore along with other coral-eating Chaetodon species they can wreak havoc on living corals in the aquarium. They should be fed a variety of foods that can include mysid shrimp, brine shrimp, krill, spirulina and foods containing algae.

== Systematics ==
C. xanthurus is one of the "crowned" butterflyfishes. These form a group of largely allopatric species sharing the overall color pattern of dark forward-pointing chevrons on silvery hues, (usually) a black-and-white crown spot and yellow to red hindparts to a stunning degree; they differ in the exact combination of hues and some small pattern details. Other members of this lineage are the atoll (C. mertensii), Eritrean (C. paucifasciatus) and Seychelles butterflyfishes (C. madagaskariensis), which are closer related among each other that any is to C. xanthurus.

The "crowned" Chaetodon are a clearly recognizable clade, but their further relationships are otherwise less clear. They were often placed in the subgenus Exornator, or considered a distinct subgenus Rhombochaetodon. According to various DNA sequence studies, some older and more singular lineages. These include species such as the Asian butterflyfish (C. argentatus), the blue-striped butterflyfish (C. fremblii) and Burgess' butterflyfish (C. burgessi). C. burgessi is in fact so peculiar that it was placed in a monotypic subgenus Roaops. Recognition of this would probably result in several other small or monotypic subgenera becoming justified, and the older Rhombochaetodon would be the more conveniently apply to the entire radiation.

The expanded group is of unclear relationships to species like the speckled butterflyfish (C. citrinellus) and the four-spotted butterflyfish (C. quadrimaculatus). These might be members of the subgenus Exornator – the lineages around the spot-banded butterflyfish (C. punctatofasciatus) – and C. citrinellus certainly looks somewhat similar to these. Yet phylogenetically, their position towards Rhombochaetodon is unresolved, and ultimately it might be better to merge both Rhombochaetodon and Roaops in Exornator. If the genus Chaetodon is split up, Exornator might become a subgenus of Lepidochaetodon or a separate genus.
