= C. mertensii =

C. mertensii may refer to:

- Carex mertensii, the Mertens' sedge, a plant species
- Chaetoceros mertensii, H.L. Honigmann, a marine planktonic diatom species in the genus Chaetoceros
- Chaetodon mertensii, the atoll butterflyfish, a species of butterflyfish found in the Pacific Ocean
