= Evoplosoma voratus =

Scientific classification
- Kingdom: Animalia
- Phylum: Echinodermata
- Class: Asteroidea
- Order: Valvatida
- Family: Goniasteridae
- Genus: Evoplosoma
- Species: E. voratus

Binomial name
- Evoplosoma voratus Mah, Nizinski & Lundsten, 2010

Species of starfish

Evoplosoma voratus is a species of deep sea corallivores (preys on deep-sea corals). This species in particular is found in seamounts in the North Pacific.
