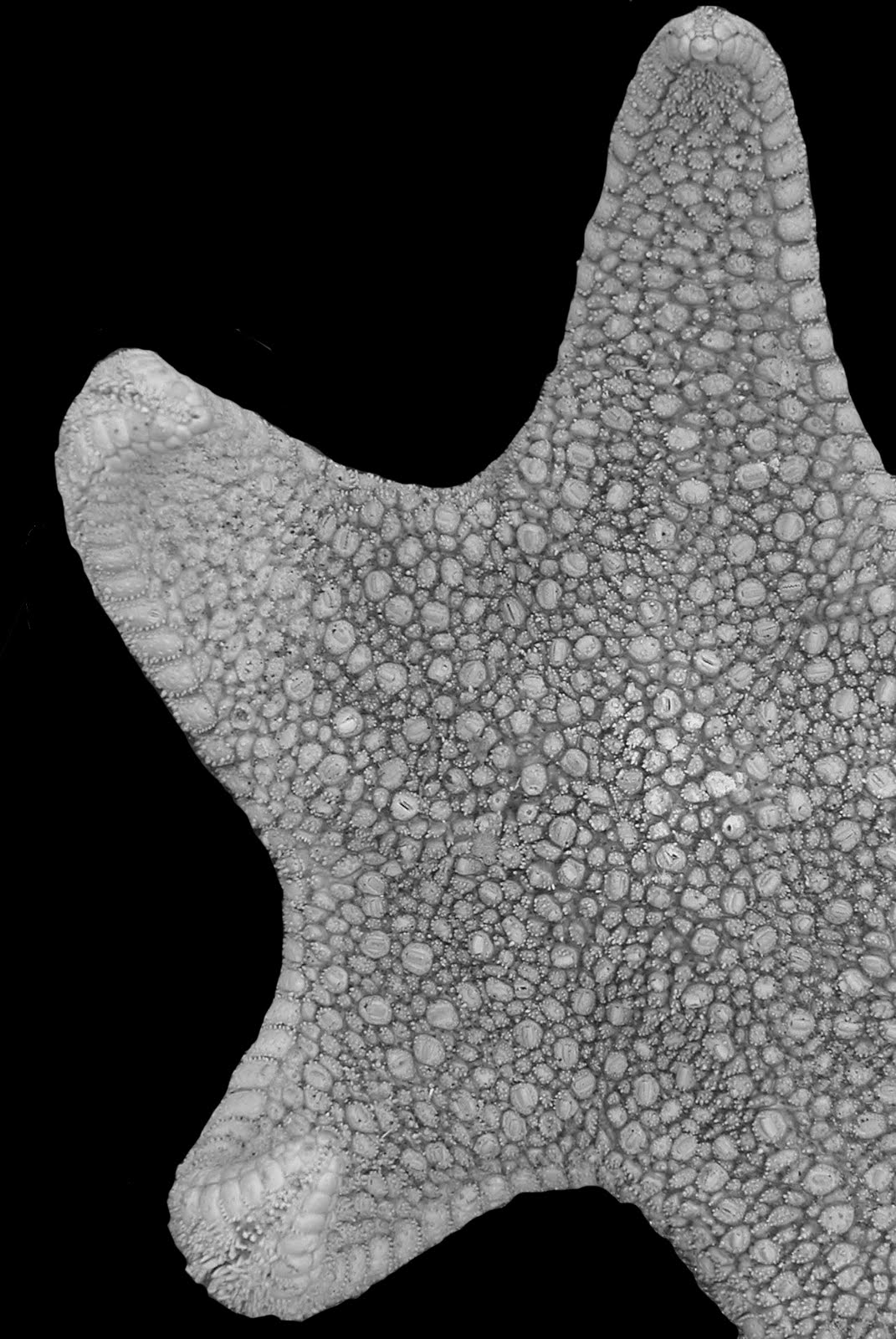

Scientific classification
- Kingdom: Animalia
- Phylum: Echinodermata
- Class: Asteroidea
- Order: Valvatida
- Family: Goniasteridae
- Subfamily: Hippasterinae
- Genus: Sthenaster; Mah, Nizinski & Lundsten, 2010
- Species: S. emmae

Binomial name
- Sthenaster emmae Mah, Nizinski & Lundsten, 2010

= Sthenaster =

Species of starfish

Sthenaster emmae is a species of deep sea corallivorous (preys on deep-sea corals) sea star. It is the only known species in the genus Sthenaster. This species in particular is found in the tropical Atlantic.

== Description ==
Sthenaster emmae has five arms, a triangular outline, actinal intermediate plates, abactinal plates, ranges from 42mm - 45mm wide, and is usually an orange color. On the actual intermediate plates, there are poorly developed teeth. In contrast, on each abactinal plate, there are about 9 to 12 interlocking teeth per valve present.

== Habitat ==
Sthenaster emmae was first found off the coast of Jacksonville, Florida and 250-501 meters outside of the ocean banks in Savannah, Georgia. At the Savannah Banks, Sthenaster emmae are found on hard rock substrate, where various sponges, corals, coral rubble, and gorgonians also share that habitat.
