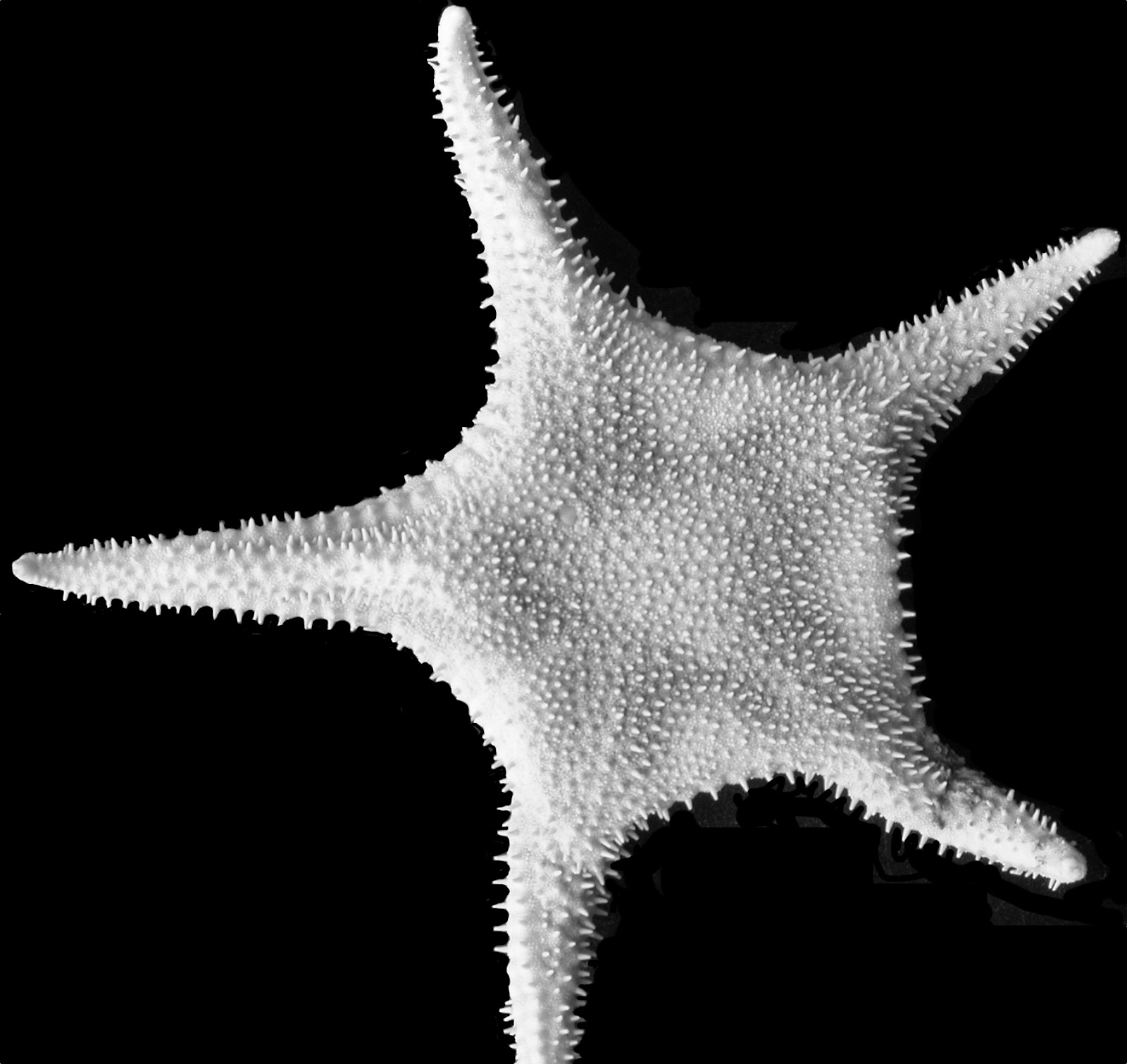
- Evoplosoma watlingi

Scientific classification
- Kingdom: Animalia
- Phylum: Echinodermata
- Class: Asteroidea
- Order: Valvatida
- Family: Goniasteridae
- Subfamily: Hippasterinae
- Genus: Evoplosoma; Fisher, 1906

= Evoplosoma =

Genus of starfishes

Evoplosoma (from Ancient Greek εὖ (eû), meaning "well", ὅπλον (hóplon), meaning "weapon, armor", and σῶμα (sôma), meaning "body") is a genus of deep-sea sea stars in the family Goniasteridae.

== Description and characteristics ==
These sea stars are typical five-armed starfish with a sizable disc in the middle. The majority of the species in this genus are found in deep waters, where they appear to prey on other cnidarians and deep sea coral.

== List of species ==
According to the World Register of Marine Species:

- Evoplosoma anguirus Mah, 2024
- Evoplosoma augusti Koehler, 1909
- Evoplosoma besseyae Mah, 2024
- Evoplosoma claguei Mah, Nizinski & Lundsten, 2010
- Evoplosoma forcipifera Fisher, 1906
- Evoplosoma mystrion Mah, 2024
- Evoplosoma nizinskiae Mah, 2020
- Evoplosoma nuku Mah, 2022
- Evoplosoma pharos Mah, 2024
- Evoplosoma scorpio Downey, 1981
- Evoplosoma tasmanica (McKnight, 2006)
- Evoplosoma timorensis Aziz & Jangoux, 1985
- Evoplosoma virgo Downey, 1982
- Evoplosoma voratus Mah, Nizinski & Lundsten, 2010
- Evoplosoma watlingi Mah, 2015
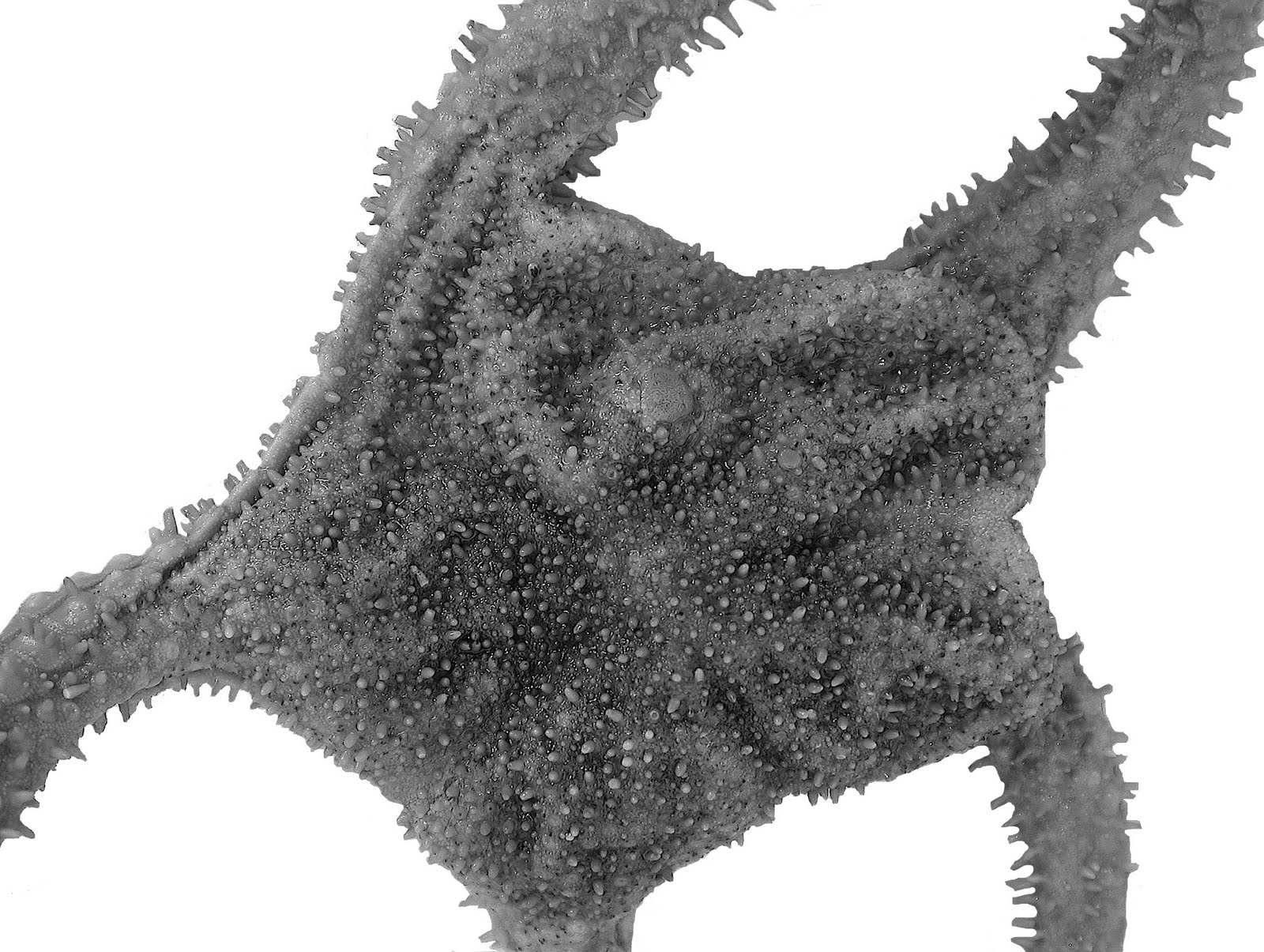
Evoplosoma claguei.

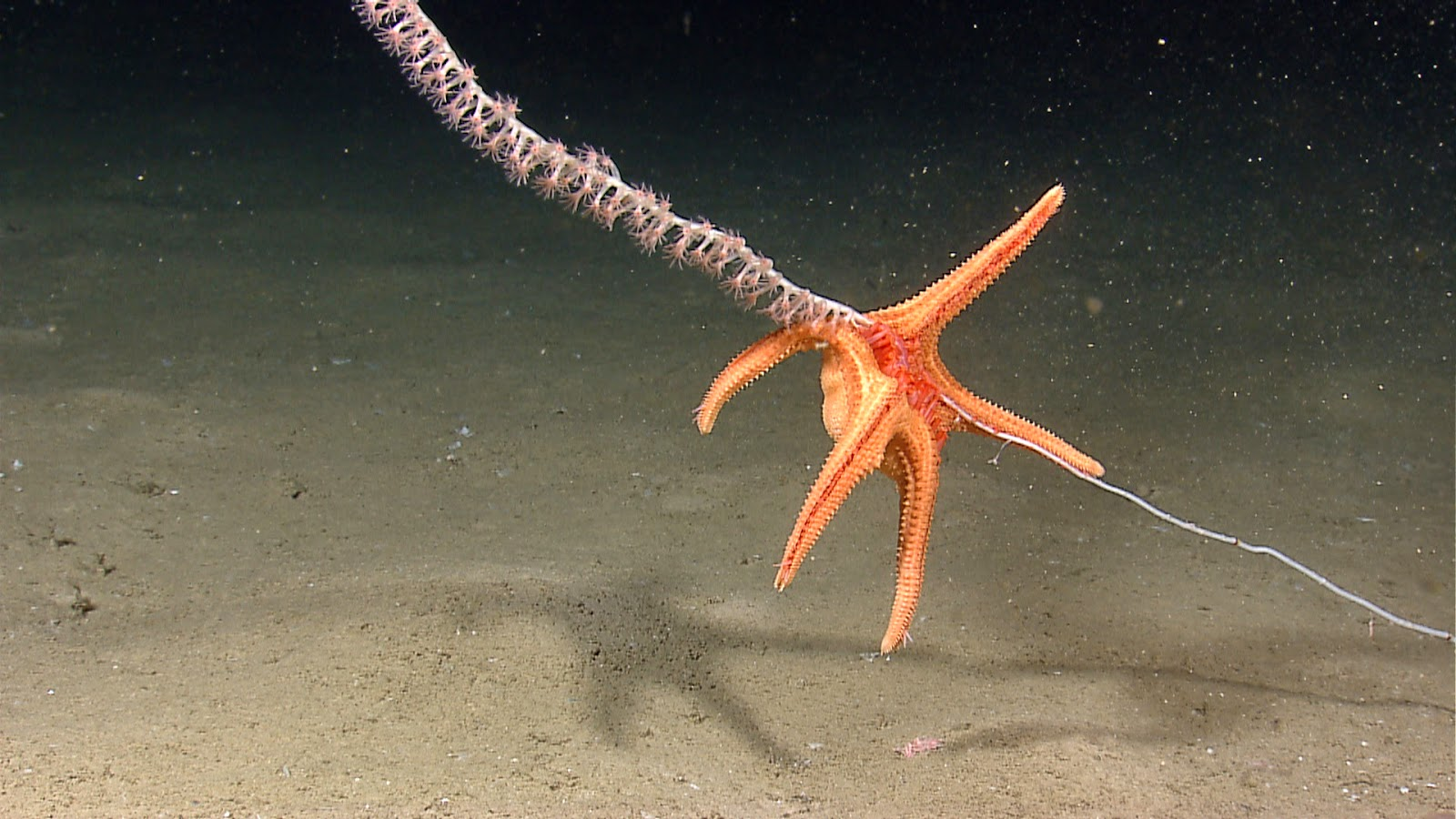
Evoplosoma watlingi feeding on a deep-sea coral colony

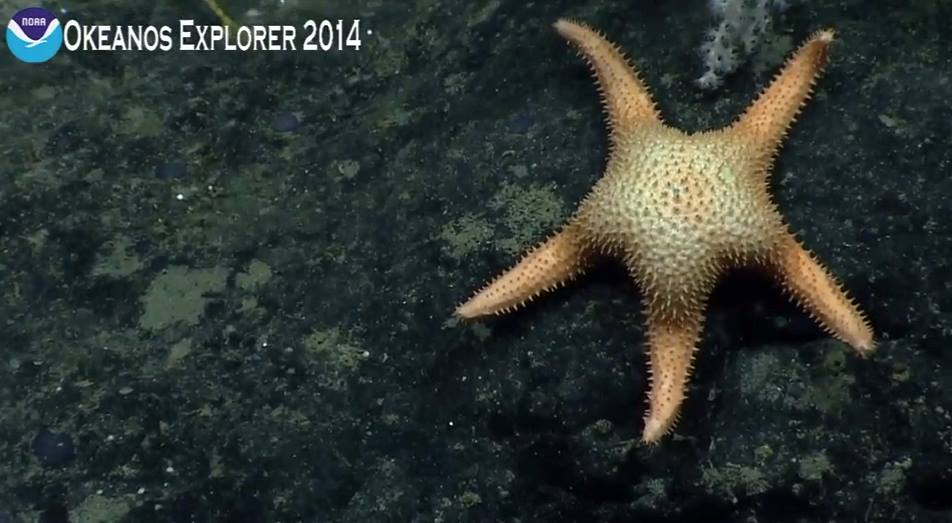
Evoplosoma sp.
