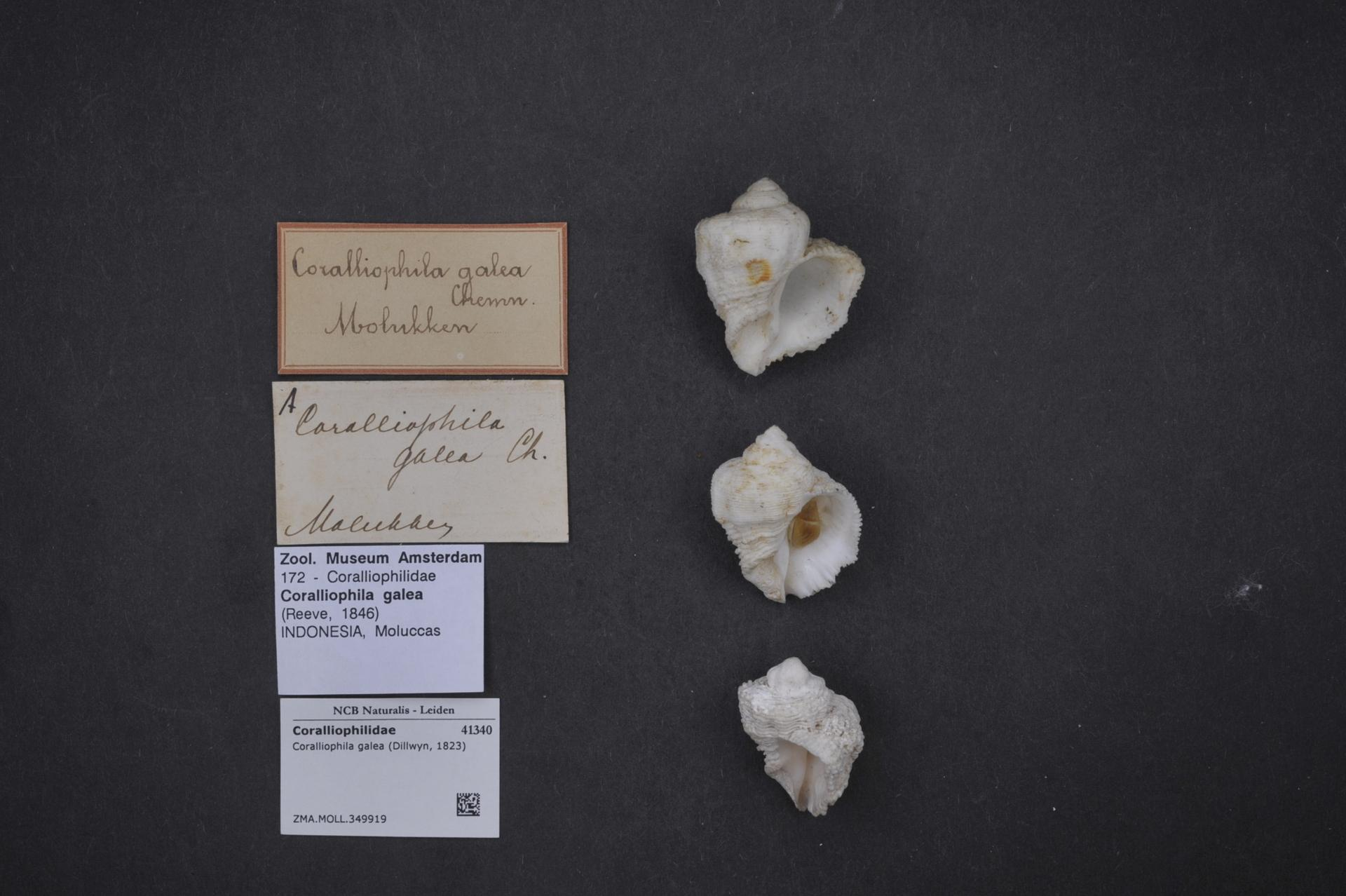
- Shell specimens of Coralliophila galea

Scientific classification
- Kingdom: Animalia
- Phylum: Mollusca
- Class: Gastropoda
- Subclass: Caenogastropoda
- Order: Neogastropoda
- Family: Muricidae
- Genus: Coralliophila
- Species: C. galea

Binomial name
- Coralliophila galea (Dillwyn, 1823)

= Coralliophila galea =

Species of sea snail

Coralliophila galea is a species of sea snail, a marine gastropod mollusk in the family Muricidae, the murex snails or rock snails.
