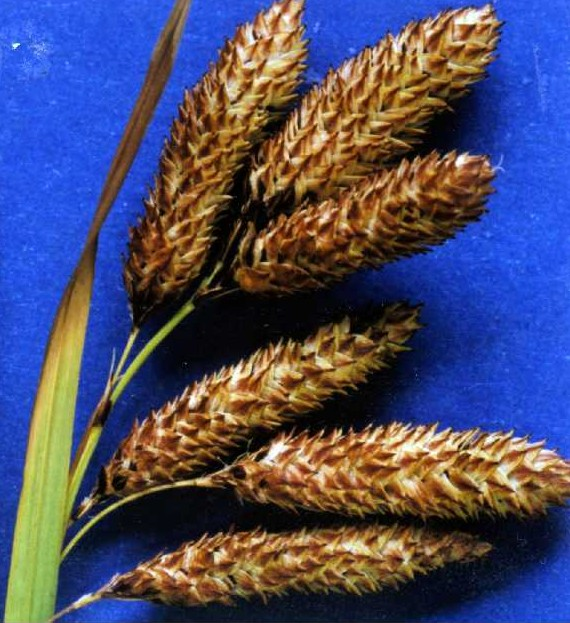

Scientific classification
- Kingdom: Plantae
- Clade: Tracheophytes
- Clade: Angiosperms
- Clade: Monocots
- Clade: Commelinids
- Order: Poales
- Family: Cyperaceae
- Genus: Carex
- Species: C. mertensii

Binomial name
- Carex mertensii J.D. Prescott ex Bong.

Synonyms
- Carex columbiana

= Carex mertensii =

Species of grass-like plant

Carex mertensii is a species of sedge known by the common name Mertens' sedge. It is native to western North America from Alaska to California to Montana, where it grows in moist and wet habitat in mountain forests and meadows. This sedge produces clumps of stems reaching maximum heights between 80 and 120 centimeters. The leaves are small; those toward the bases of the stems are reduced to sheaths only. The inflorescence is a densely packed, bullet shaped cluster of overlapping flowers, mainly hanging on long peduncles. Each inflorescence is generally 2 to 4 centimeters long. Each of the flowers has a dark-colored bract.
