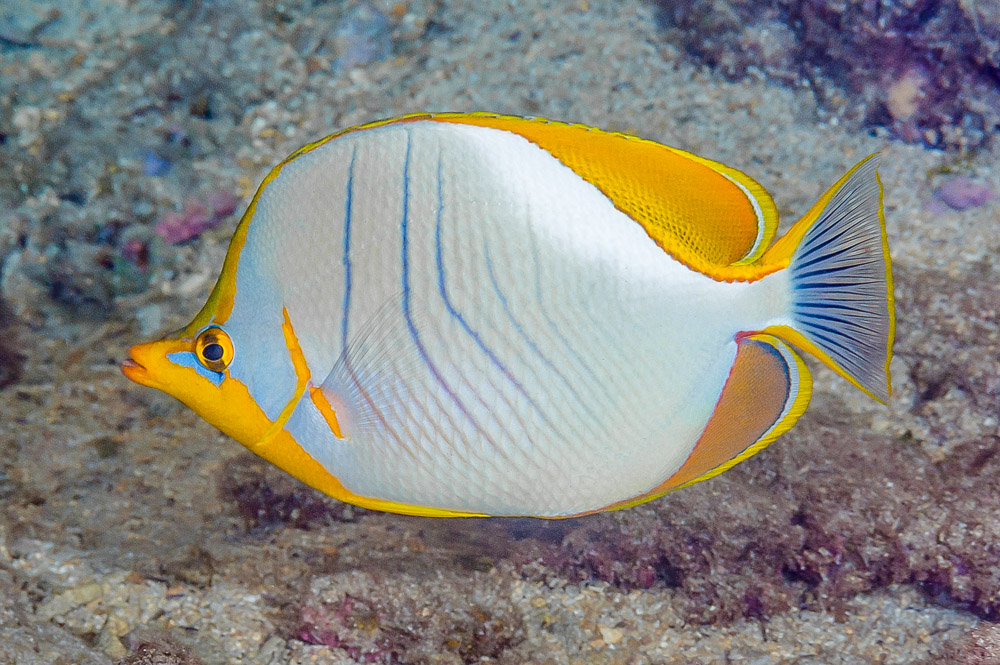

Conservation status
- Least Concern (IUCN 3.1)

Scientific classification
- Kingdom: Animalia
- Phylum: Chordata
- Class: Actinopterygii
- Division: Teleostei
- Order: Acanthuriformes
- Family: Chaetodontidae
- Genus: Chaetodon
- Subgenus: Chaetodon (Rabdophorus)
- Species: C. xanthocephalus

Binomial name
- Chaetodon xanthocephalus E. T. Bennett, 1833

Synonyms
- Chaetodon nigripinnatus Desjardins, 1836; Chaetodon nigripinnis Peters, 1855; Chelmo pulcher Steindachner, 1875; Tetragonoptrus pulcher (Steindachner, 1875); Chaetodon auromarginatus Bliss, 1883; Chaetodon dayi Ahl, 1923

= Yellowhead butterflyfish =

Species of fish

Chaetodon xanthocephalus, known commonly as the yellowhead butterflyfish, is a species of marine fish in the family Chaetodontidae. It is found in the Indian Ocean.

== Taxonomy ==
The yellowhead butterflyfish was first formally described in 1833 by the English naturalist Edward Turner Bennett (1797–1836) with the type locality given as Ceylon. It belongs to the large subgenus Rabdophorus which might warrant recognition as a distinct genus. It has been recorded hybridising with saddle butterflyfish (C. ephippium).

== Description ==
The yellowhead butterflyfish has a pearly white body with a golden-yellow band of colour on the head, along the dorsal and ventral parts of the body and on the fins. The white is broken by greyish blue chevrons. It has a short black vertical bar running through the eyes and a thin yellow line on the rear of the operculum. The orange dorsal and anal fins have light blackmarks on their lower rear parts and yellow margins. The caudal fin is light grey also edged in yellow. The dorsal fin contains 13–14 spines and 21–26 soft rays while the anal fin has 3 spines and 21–23 soft rays. The yellowhead butterflyfish attains a maximum total length of 20 centimetres (7.9 in).

== Distribution ==
The yellowhead butterflyfish is widespread throughout the tropical waters of the Indian Ocean. It occurs from Somalia to Durban in South Africa and Madagascar, east as far as Sri Lanka, western Thailand and northwestern Sumatra.

== Habitat and biology ==
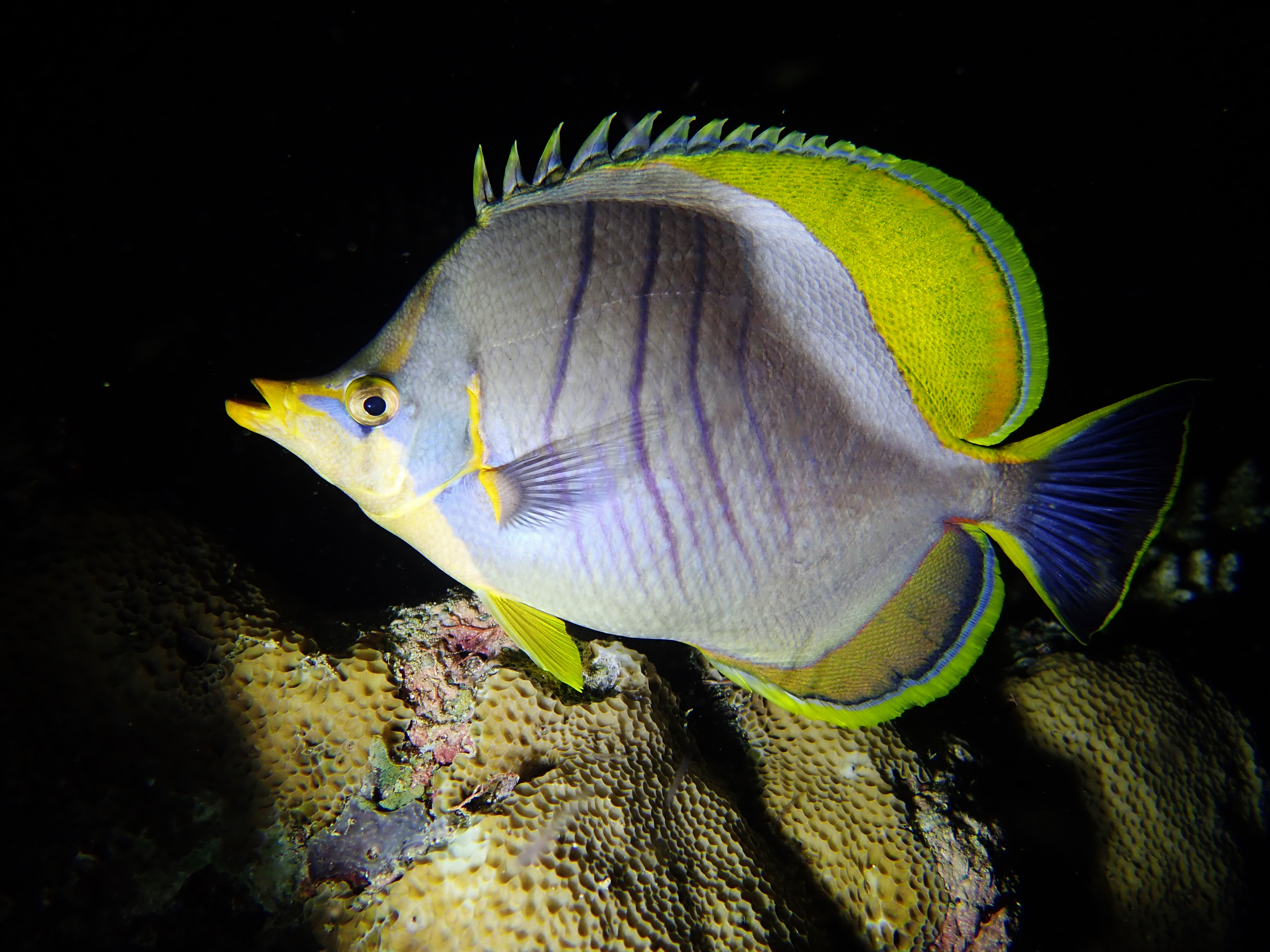
Night time colouration

The yellowhead butterflyfish is found at depths between 1 and 30 m. They are usually solitary, but may form loose shoals of 5–6 individuals and usually found around isolated coral heads. They are territorial and aggressive to other chaetodonts and omnivorous. They form pairs for breeding and the females swell up when ready to spawn, the eggs are scattered into the water and the male fertilises them. The spherical eggs float and after what is probably a period of 28–30 hours they hatch. After hatching the larvae develops a bony plate over its head, these larvae are called tholichthys, and they are pelagic for quite a long period. They slowly mature into juveniles. It is the tholichthys phase of their life cycle that makes it so difficult to breed butterflyfish in captivity.
