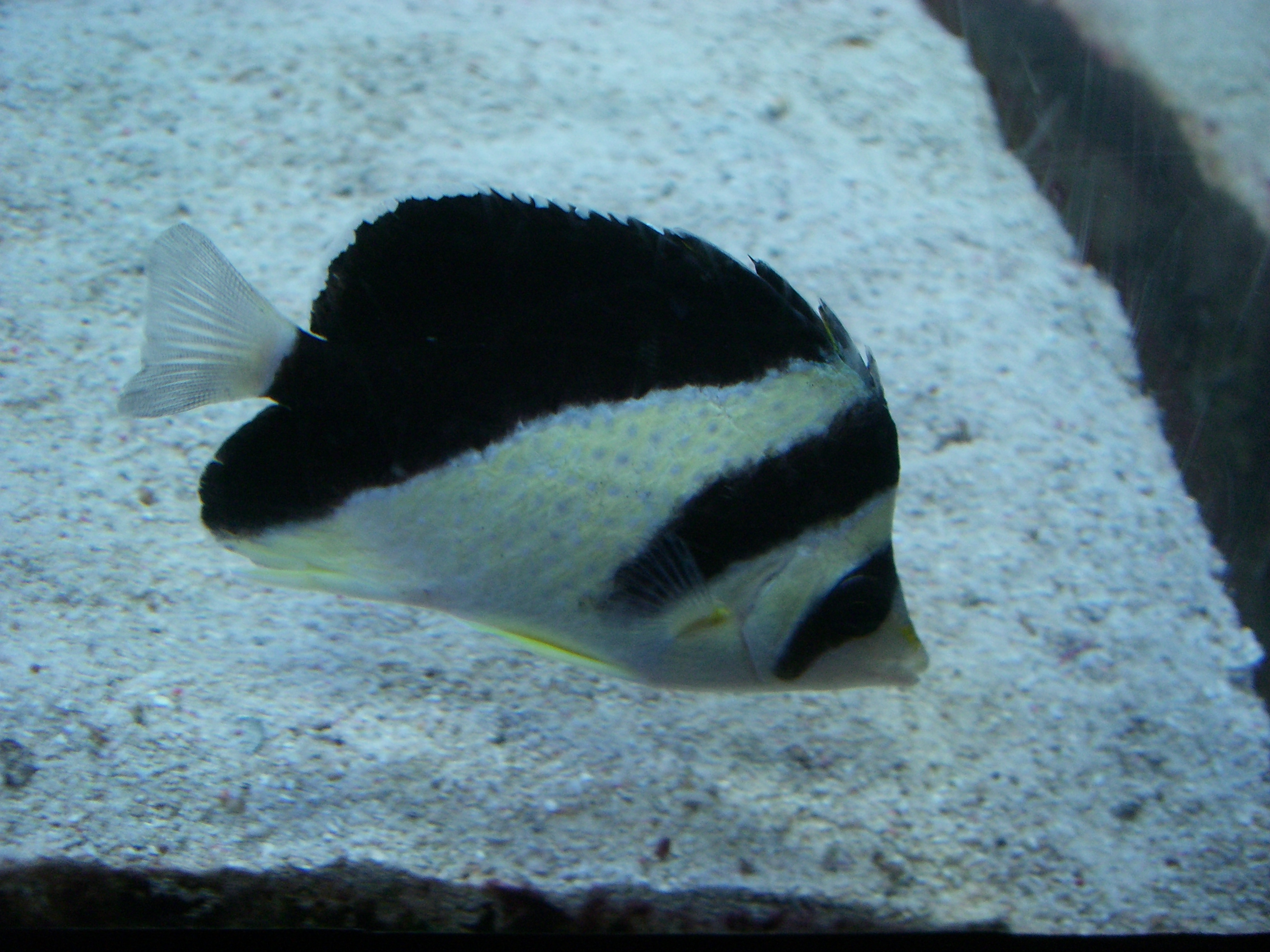

Conservation status
- Least Concern (IUCN 3.1)

Scientific classification
- Kingdom: Animalia
- Phylum: Chordata
- Class: Actinopterygii
- Division: Teleostei
- Order: Acanthuriformes
- Family: Chaetodontidae
- Genus: Chaetodon
- Subgenus: Rhombochaetodon
- Species: C. burgessi

Binomial name
- Chaetodon burgessi G. R. Allen & Starck, 1973

= Burgess' butterflyfish =

Species of fish

Burgess' butterflyfish (Chaetodon burgessi), also known as the black & white butterflyfish or black-barred butterflyfish, is a species of marine ray-finned fish, a butterflyfish belonging to the family Chaetodontidae. It occurs in the western Pacific Ocean.

== Description ==
Burgess' butterflyfish is whitish to pale yellowish and is marked by three areas of contrasting black. The first is a black bar which runs through the eye, the second is a diagonal bar which starts at the top of the head and runs to the rear of the base of the pectoral fin while the third is a wide black wedge covering the posterior of the body. The dorsal fin contains 13 spines and 18–19 soft rays while the anal fin has 3 spines and 15–16 soft rays. This species attains a maximum total length of 14 centimetres (5.5 in).

== Distribution ==
Burgess' butterflyfish is found in the western Pacific Ocean where it has been recorded from Green Island off southern Taiwan, the Indonesian islands of Flores, Sulawesi and Raja Ampat, Sabah in Malaysia, Palau, the Philippines, Papua New Guinea, the Solomon Islands, Pohnpei in the Federated States of Micronesia and Tonga. It has also been recorded in Australia at Rowley Shoals in Western Australia and Holmes Reef in the Coral Sea, Queensland.

== Habitat and biology ==
Burgess' butterflyfish are found along drop-offs where there is an abundance of gorgonians and black corals, typically at depths greater than 40 metres (130 ft), although in places they will occur in shallower water. They are encountered as either solitary fish or in pairs. This is an oviparous species and they form pairs for breeding. They feed on gorgonians, black corals, worms, crustaceans, sponges and other invertebrates.

== Taxonomy and etymology ==
Burgess' butterflyfish was first formally described in 1973 by the American ichthyologists Gerald R. Allen and Walter A. Starck II with the type locality given as off Bairakaseru Island in the Ngemelis Islands part of the Palau Islands in the Philippine Sea. The specific name honours the American ichthyologist Warren E. Burgess who wrote a 1978 revision of the Chaetodontidae during which he brought Allen and Starck's attention to this species and its affinity with the Indian butterflyfish (C. mitratus). Populations of similar fishes to C. burgessi in the Marshall Islands are thought to be hybrids between this species and the Marquesas butterflyfish (C. declivis).

== Utilisation ==
Burgess' butterflyfish is collected for the aquarium trade with most fish in that trade being exported from the Philippines. Although it can be a demanding species to maintain they can be useful in controlling Aiptasia sea anemones which can be a problem in aquariums.
