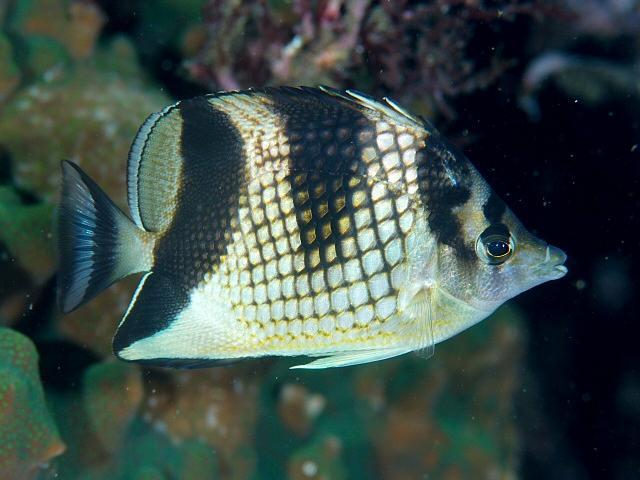

Conservation status
- Least Concern (IUCN 3.1)

Scientific classification
- Kingdom: Animalia
- Phylum: Chordata
- Class: Actinopterygii
- Division: Teleostei
- Order: Acanthuriformes
- Family: Chaetodontidae
- Genus: Chaetodon
- Subgenus: Rhombochaetodon
- Species: C. argentatus

Binomial name
- Chaetodon argentatus H. M. Smith & Radcliffe, 1911

Synonyms
- Anisochaetodon argentatus (Smith & Radcliffe, 1911)

= Chaetodon argentatus =

Species of fish

Chaetodon argentatus, the Asian butterflyfish, three band butterflyfish or black pearlscaled butterflyfish, is a species of marine ray-finned fish a butterflyfish belonging to the family Chaetodontidae. It is native to the western Pacific Ocean.

== Description ==
Chaetodon argentatus has a silver coloured body which is marked by a mesh of diagonal black lines creating a net like pattern. There are also two black saddle marks with a black vertical band at the rear of the body running from the soft rayed part of the dorsal fin to the equivalent part of the anal fin. There are 13–14 spines and 21–22 soft rays in the dorsal fin while the anal fin contains 3 spines and 15–16 soft rays. This species attains a maximum total length of 20 centimetres (7.9 in).

== Distribution ==
Chaetodon argentatus is found in the Western Pacific where it is distributed from the Ryukyu and Izu Islands of southern Japan south to the northern Philippines and east to Taiwan.

== Habitat and biology ==
Chaetodon argentatus can be found over the outer slopes of coral or rocky reefs and drop-offs. Off southern Japan it lives over rocky areas, but in the more southerly parts of its distribution it has an association with coral reefs. They are typically observed in pairs or small schools. It is an oviparous species which forms pairs to breed. These fish are omnivorous and feed on filamentous algae, crustaceans, worms, sponges, bivalves, soft and stony corals, hydroids and other invertebrates.

== Taxonomy ==
Chaetodon argentatus was first formally described in 1911 by the American ichthyologists Hugh McCormick Smith (1865–1941) and Lewis Radcliffe (1880–1950) with the type locality given as Agojo Point on the Catanduanes Islands off southern Luzon Island in the Philippines. It has hybridised in the wild, off southern Japan, with the crosshatch butterflyfish (Chaetodon xanthurus).

== Utilisation ==
Chaetodon argentatus is uncommon in the aquarium trade outside Japan, although relatively easy to maintain in an aquarium its comparatively muted colouration means it is not as popular as its congeners.
