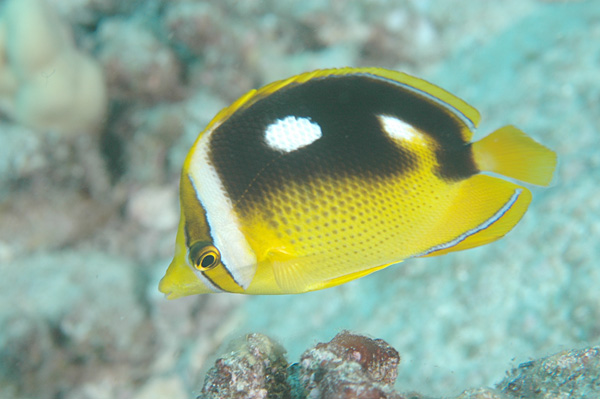

Conservation status
- Least Concern (IUCN 3.1)

Scientific classification
- Kingdom: Animalia
- Phylum: Chordata
- Class: Actinopterygii
- Division: Teleostei
- Order: Acanthuriformes
- Family: Chaetodontidae
- Genus: Chaetodon
- Subgenus: Chaetodon (Exornator)
- Species: C. quadrimaculatus

Binomial name
- Chaetodon quadrimaculatus J. E. Gray, 1831

Synonyms
- Heterochaetodon lepidochaetodon quadrimaculatus (Gray, 1831)

= Fourspot butterflyfish =

Species of fish

The four-spotted butterflyfish or fourspot butterflyfish (Chaetodon quadrimaculatus) is a species of butterflyfish (family Chaetodontidae) found in the Pacific Ocean from the Ryukyus, Ogasawara (Bonin) Islands and Taiwan to the Hawaiian, Marquesan, and Pitcairn islands, south to the Samoan and Austral Islands and the Marianas and Marshall Islands in Micronesia.

The fourspot butterflyfish is a marine coralivorous organism. Therefore, its noted geographic distribution, as well as population-level spatial distribution and temporal variation in density, is correlated to relative distributions and abundance of the corals that butterflyfish are dependent on for food.

It is a quite distinct species, but most closely related to the speckled butterflyfish (C. citrinellus). Together they are basal in the subgenus Exornator, and might be intermediate between the core group of this subgenus and the species of the Rhombochaetodon (or Roaops) lineage. If that is correct, the latter would require to be merged into Exornator. If the genus Chaetodon is split up, Exornator might become a subgenus of Lepidochaetodon.

Butterflyfish as a family are a common marine aquarium specimen as a result of their varying colors and patterns, and contribute to 4% of the global fish trade.

== Taxonomy ==
As one of 90 extant species in the genus Chaetodon, the fourspot butterflyfish shares the following characteristics: a laterally compressed body with bilateral symmetry, and ctenoid scales, identified by their comb-like edges. One defining characteristic of this species is its four rounded, eye-shaped spots, two on each lateral surface. These spots are theorized to help this butterflyfish avoid predation by either intimidating predators or diverting attack of predators to potentially less fatal regions of the body.

== Diet and feeding ==
C. quadrimaculatus is an obligate, hard coral feeder, an adaptation that is theorized to have evolved approximately 3.2 million years ago. This species is highly dependent on scleractinian corals, an order of Anthozoa where approximately 50% of species are reef-building zooxanthellate. Butterflyfish typically feed from corals by removing individual polyps while leaving the calcareous skeleton undisturbed. They use a picking method where they grip prey with the tips of their upper and lower anterior jaws. Due to their specialized dependence on corals, C. quadrimaculatus and other obligate corallivorous species have an increased bite rate, pointing to a higher feeding efficiency, than butterflyfish that are facultative corallivores.

== Social structure ==
Owing to their obligate dependence on corals, fourspot butterflyfish tend to be distributed in stable feeding territories with high fidelity for each site and male-dominated defense mechanisms. The social structure is dominated by heterosexual, adult pair-bonds, while juveniles are typically solitary. However, there have also been observations of homosexual pair bonds and pair bonds between sexually immature butterflyfish in this genus.

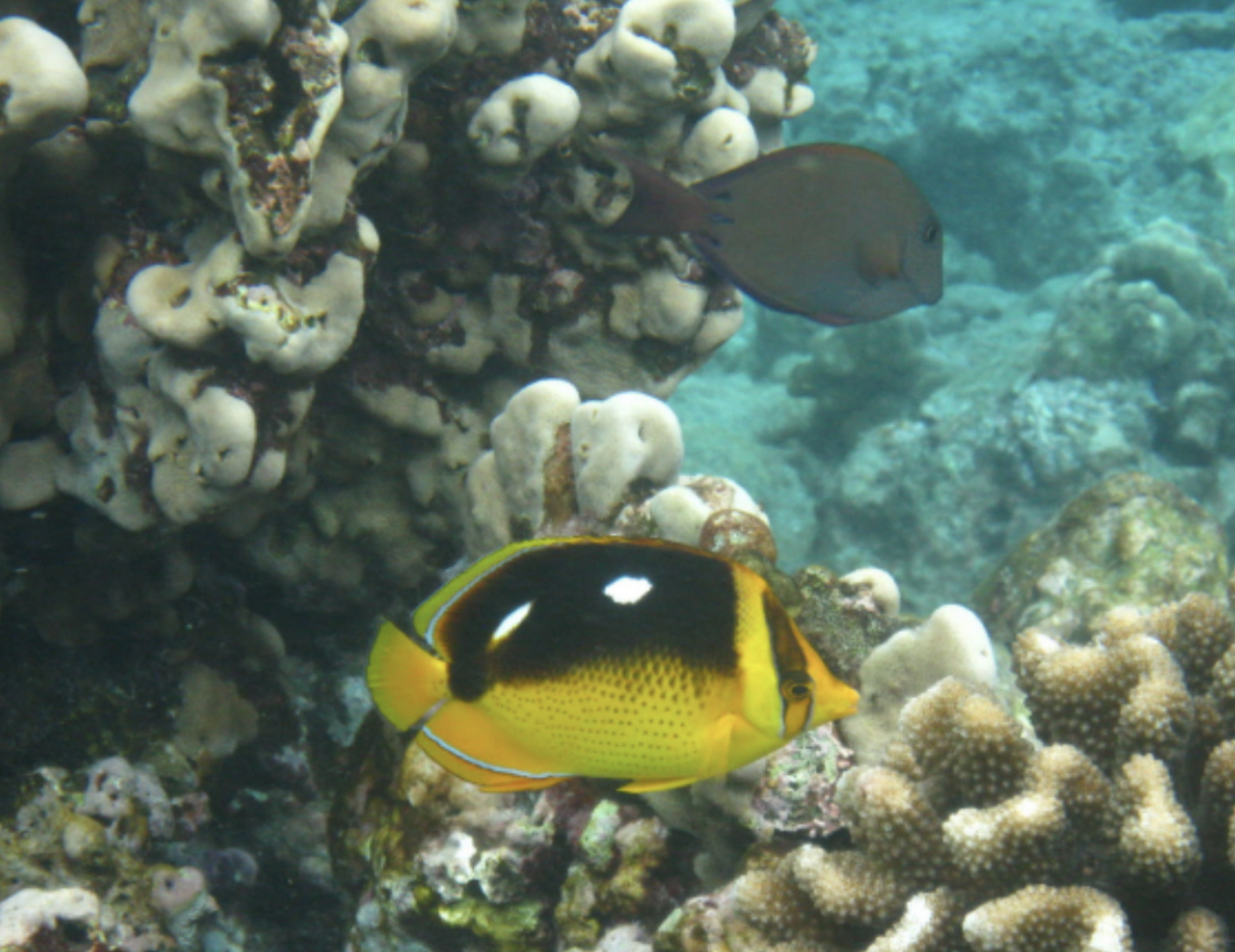
A fourspot butterflyfish with another fish.

Therefore, the evolution of pair bonds may offer benefits beyond increasing reproductive fitness. Other proposed advantages of pair-bonding include increased foraging efficiency and vigilance against predators. Within heterosexual pair-bonds, evidence supports the evolution of sex-specific roles rather than mutual territory defense. In this division of labor, males actively defend territory allowing females to successfully forage and therefore increase their fecundity.

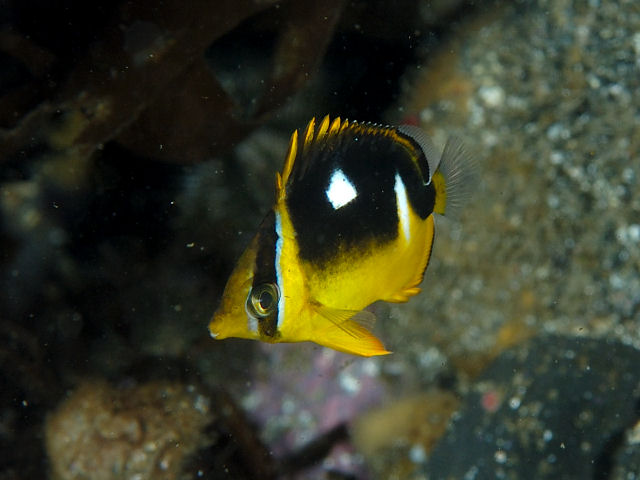
Juvenile

== Reproduction and development ==
Fourspot butterfly fish typically reproduce in monogamous pair bonds. They reproduce via spawn breeding where the gonochoristic males and females release their respective gametes into the water column for fertilization. Eggs are typically less than 1 mm in their pelagic form and fertilized eggs hatch in approximately 30 hours. Like other butterfly fish in this family, C. quadrimaculatus has a specialized larval state called tholichthys, where the head is covered by fused plates, giving rise to a distinctive head spination. Although no definitive results have been collected, there is little to minimal or no parental care in this species as a result of their spawn breeding reproductive tactic. After larval development and hatching, juveniles directly settle on coral which offer protection from predators.

== Conservation ==
Since fourspot butterflyfish are highly associated with scleractinian coral, they are an indicator of reef health and their relative abundance is contingent on coral reef abundance. With recent global changes in climate, especially the 2015–2016 rise in water temperatures and mass coral bleaching event in the central Indo-Pacific, this species may have experienced a decrease in food resource. Large-scale coral bleaching has also been associated with decreases in both interspecific and intraspecific aggression in butterflyfish. Research in other species of butterflyfish show that local coral bleaching does not have immediate effects on local population abundance of butterflyfish, but does lead to sublethal effects such as decreased growth and reproduction rates.
