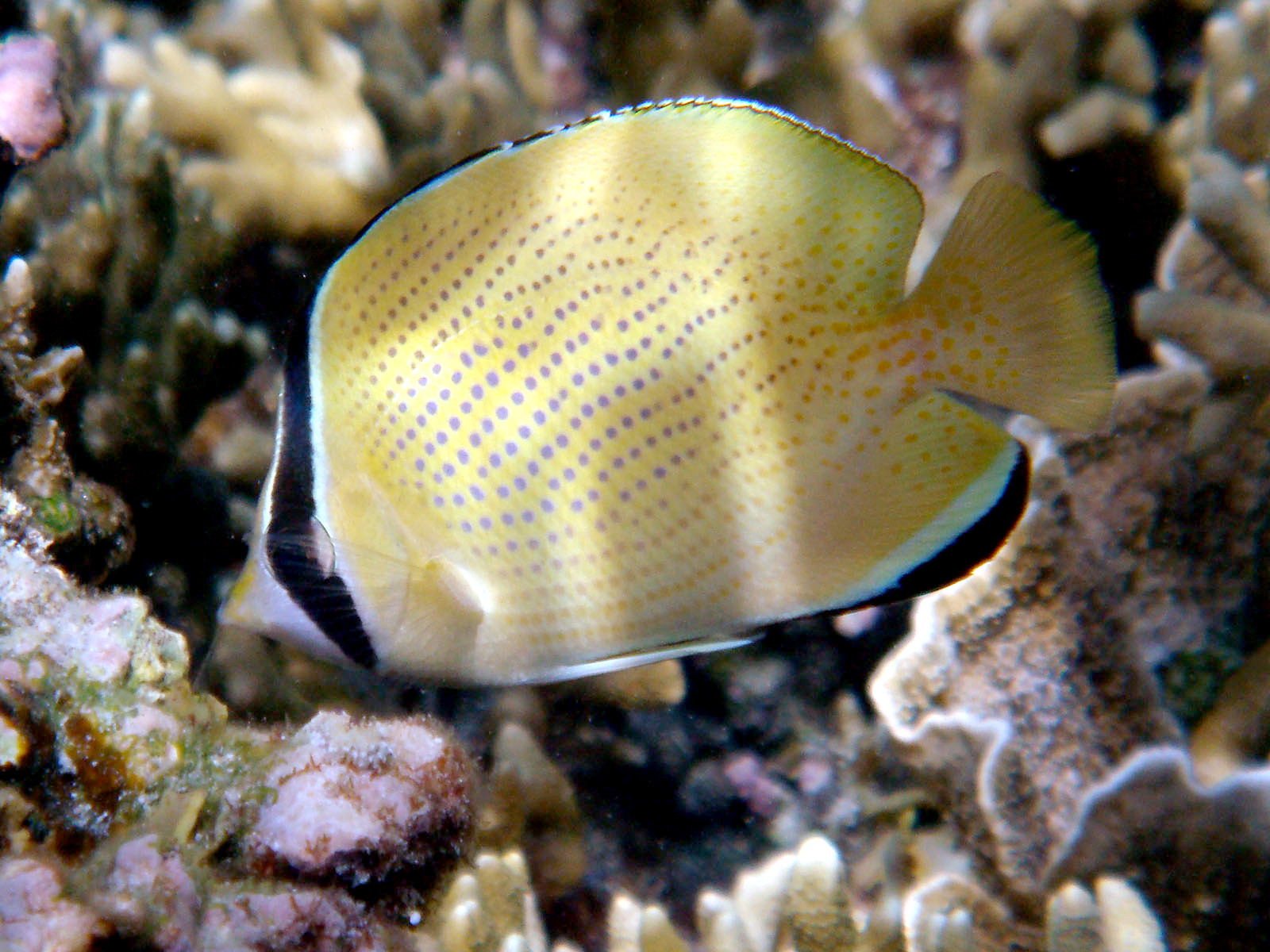

Conservation status
- Least Concern (IUCN 3.1)

Scientific classification
- Kingdom: Animalia
- Phylum: Chordata
- Class: Actinopterygii
- Order: Acanthuriformes
- Family: Chaetodontidae
- Genus: Chaetodon
- Subgenus: Chaetodon (Exornator)
- Species: C. citrinellus

Binomial name
- Chaetodon citrinellus G. Cuvier, 1831

Synonyms
- Exornator exornator citrinellus (Cuvier, 1831); Chaetodon nigripes De Vis, 1884; Chaetodon citrinellus semipunctatus Ahl, 1923

= Speckled butterflyfish =

Species of fish

Chaetodon citrinellus is a species of butterflyfish (family Chaetodontidae). It is commonly known as the speckled butterflyfish or citron butterflyfish. It is found in the Indo-Pacific: the Red Sea, East Africa to the Hawaiian, Marquesan and Tuamotu islands, north to southern Japan and south to Australia.

It is a distinct species, most closely related to the fourspot butterflyfish (C. quadrimaculatus). Together they are basal in the subgenus Exornator, and might be intermediate between the core group of this subgenus and the species of the Rhombochaetodon (or Roaops) lineage. If that is correct, the latter would require to be merged into Exornator. If the genus Chaetodon is split up, Exornator might become a subgenus of Lepidochaetodon.

== Description and ecology ==
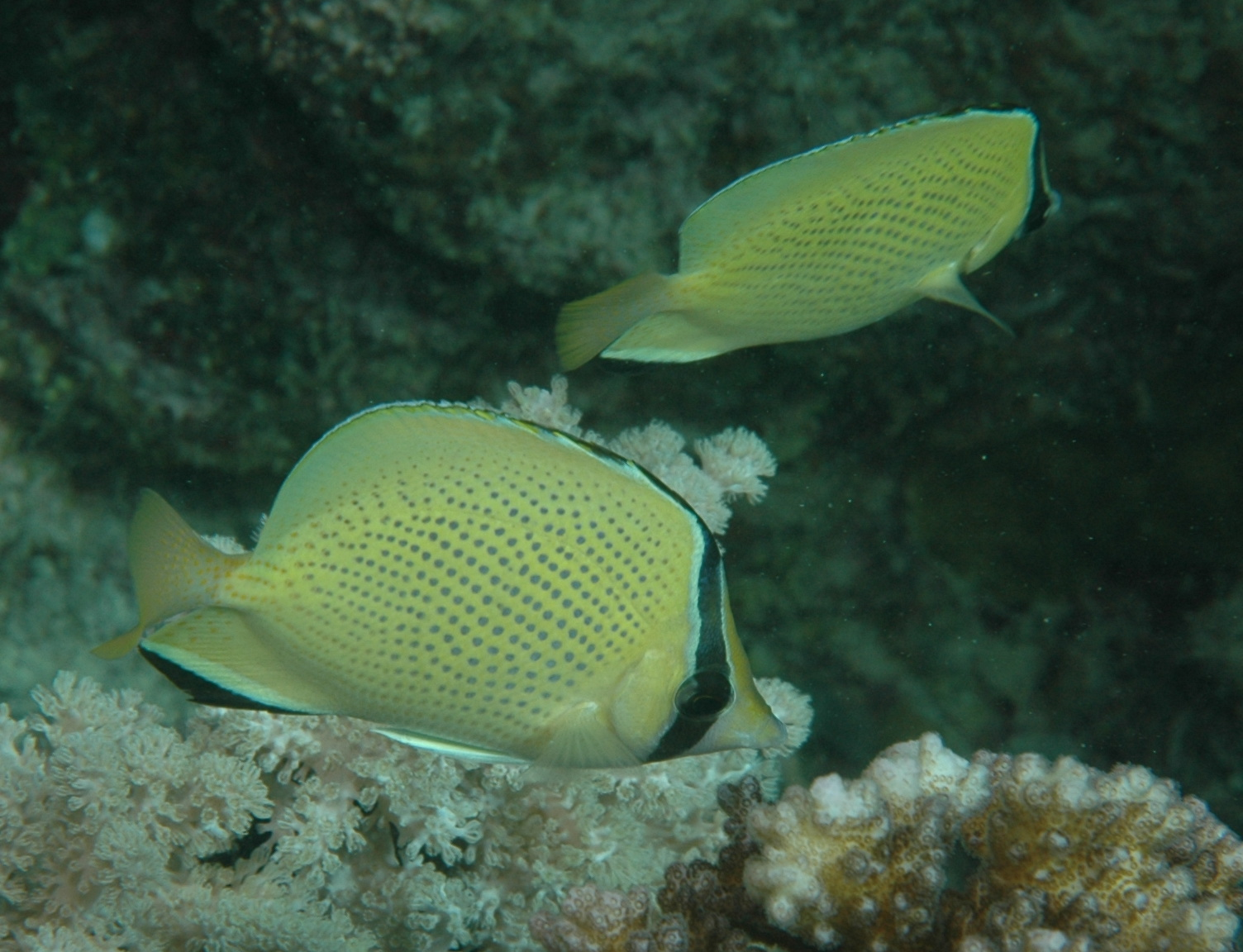
Speckled butterflyfish are often found in pairs.

As its names suggest, it is pale yellow with numerous small dark spots. There is also a black bar extending above and below the eye and a black margin to the anal fin. The largest recorded specimen was 13 centimeters (5.1 in) long.

C. citrinellus is common in shallow exposed reef flats, lagoons, and seaward reefs, generally in relatively open areas with scattered corals. They may occasionally be found at greater depth, as deep as 36 meters (118 ft). They feed on small worms, small benthic invertebrates, coral polyps and filamentous algae.

Adults usually swim in pairs (pairs form during breeding), while juveniles are more often seen in small aggregations and commonly mix with other similar sized juveniles, especially of the Sunburst Butterflyfish (C. kleinii). They are oviparous.
