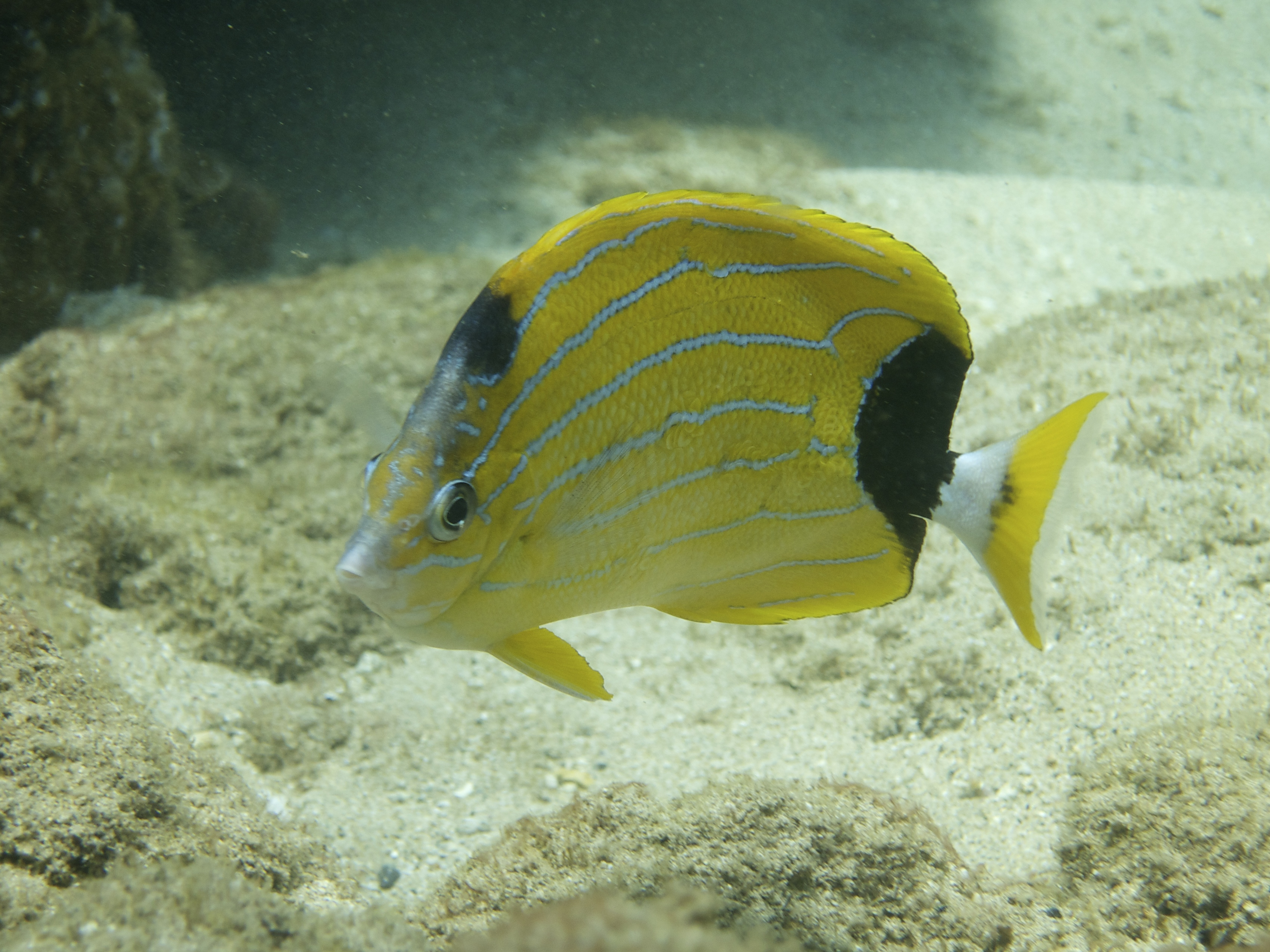

Conservation status
- Least Concern (IUCN 3.1)

Scientific classification
- Kingdom: Animalia
- Phylum: Chordata
- Class: Actinopterygii
- Division: Teleostei
- Order: Acanthuriformes
- Family: Chaetodontidae
- Genus: Chaetodon
- Subgenus: Rhombochaetodon
- Species: C. fremblii

Binomial name
- Chaetodon fremblii E.T. Bennett, 1828

= Bluestripe butterflyfish =

Species of fish

The bluestripe butterflyfish or blue-striped butterflyfish (Chaetodon fremblii) is a species of butterflyfish (family Chaetodontidae) found in the waters surrounding the Hawaiian Islands. The fish is endemic to Hawaii where it is common on shallow water reefs.

== Description ==
The bluestripe butterflyfish, like other butterflyfish, are laterally flattened fish up to 15 cm (6 in) long with pointed snouts and rectangular bodies. The dorsal fin has 12 to 14 spines and 20 to 21 soft rays, while the anal fin has 3 spines and 16 to 18 soft rays. The bluestripe butterflyfish has eight distinctive diagonal blue stripes radiating from the eye region, on a yellow background. There is a black spot at the top of the head and another larger spot of black at the base of the tail. This latter dark patch may serve to distract predators by encouraging them to attack the tail rather than the head end.

== Distribution ==
The bluestripe butterflyfish is endemic to the Hawaiian Islands where it is described as being abundant on coral and rocky reefs down to depths of about 28 m (90 ft).

== Ecology ==
The bluestripe butterflyfish is an omnivore, unlike some butterflyfishes which feed almost exclusively on corals. These specialists usually have mating systems involving a pair bond, but the omnivorous bluestripe butterflyfish lives in a more resource-rich environment, where it is easier to find sufficient food. As a result, males of this species operate a harem system, defending a territory which includes up to four smaller female territories.

== Taxonomy and etymology ==
The bluestripe butterflyfish was first formally described in 1828 by the English naturalist Edward Turner Bennett (1797–1836). The specific name honours Lieutenant John Frembly R.N., a marine surveyor and geologist, who presented a collection of fish specimens from the Sandwich Islands to the Zoological Society of London.

== Utilisation ==
The bluestripe butterflyfish is sometimes kept in reef aquaria where its generalised diet means that it is easier to maintain than corallivorous types. Specimens are harvested from the wild and it is sometimes difficult to get the fish to eat in captivity. In this respect, juveniles within two or three months of settling are more willing to accept prepared and novel foods. Attempts have been made to breed the fish in captivity, but the lengthy larval period of about two months in the open ocean is difficult to replicate in captivity.
