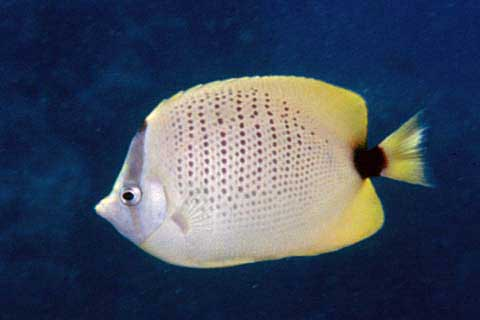

Conservation status
- Least Concern (IUCN 3.1)

Scientific classification
- Kingdom: Animalia
- Phylum: Chordata
- Class: Actinopterygii
- Order: Acanthuriformes
- Family: Chaetodontidae
- Genus: Chaetodon
- Subgenus: Chaetodon (Exornator)
- Species: C. miliaris

Binomial name
- Chaetodon miliaris Quoy & Gaimard, 1825

Synonyms
- Heterochaetodon burgessius miliaris (Quoy & Gaimard, 1825); Chaetodon mantelliger Jenkins, 1901

= Millet butterflyfish =

Species of fish

The millet butterflyfish (Chaetodon miliaris) is a species of butterflyfish in the family Chaetodontidae. Other common names include the lemon butterflyfish and the millet-seed butterflyfish. It is endemic to the Hawaiian Islands and the Johnston Atoll, where it is found at depths down to 250 m (820 ft). Although it has a limited range, it is common around Hawaii, and the International Union for Conservation of Nature has listed its conservation status as being of "least concern".

== Taxonomy ==
In its subgenus Exornator, it probably belongs to a group that also includes the African butterflyfish (C. dolosus), the crochet butterflyfish (C. guentheri) and the reef butterflyfish (C. sedentarius). The crochet butterflyfish might be the closest living relative of C. miliaris. If the genus Chaetodon is split up, Exornator might become a subgenus of Lepidochaetodon.

== Description ==
The millet butterflyfish grows to a maximum length of 13 cm (5 in). It is a deep-bodied, laterally flattened fish. The dorsal fin has 13 to 14 spines and 20 to 23 soft rays and the anal fin has 2 to 3 spines and 17 to 20 soft rays. The general body colour is whitish or yellow, with a number of vertical rows of dark spots on the flanks. A broad black stripe runs from above the eye to the base of the operculum, and there is a large black patch on the caudal peduncle.

== Distribution and habitat ==
This fish is endemic to the Hawaiian Islands and the Johnston Atoll, and is found down to depths of at least 250 m (820 ft). Its habitats include coastal fringing reefs, outer reefs and lagoons.

== Ecology ==
The millet butterflyfish is a schooling species found in mid-water that feeds on zooplankton. It also feeds opportunistically on polychaete worms and other small invertebrates on the seabed. Food is drawn into the mouth by rapid suction. It does not seem to be territorial but forms aggregations to feed at particular sites on the reef. Although its breeding habits are unknown, the gonads are large as compared with the body size, suggesting that it may have a promiscuous mating system. Breeding takes place between January and May, and newly settled juveniles are found in inner reef areas between April and June.

This butterflyfish is sometimes collected from the wild for the aquarium trade. Its feeding habits make it more suitable for keeping in a reef aquarium than more specialist butterflyfish species that feed on scleractinian corals. Although rare at Johnston Atoll, it is plentiful around the Hawaiian Islands. The International Union for Conservation of Nature believes that the population is stable and that collection has little impact, and they assess the conservation status of this fish as being of "least concern".
