= African butterflyfish =

African butterflyfish may refer to:

- Freshwater butterflyfish, Pantodon bulchhozi, a freshwater bonytongue fish
- Chaetodon dolosus, a saltwater butterflyfish
