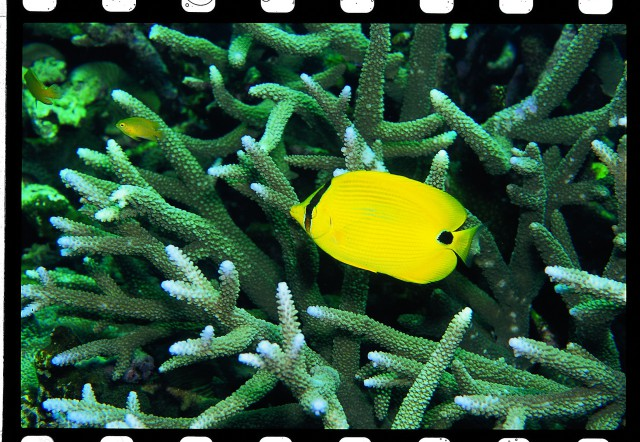

Conservation status
- Data Deficient (IUCN 3.1)

Scientific classification
- Kingdom: Animalia
- Phylum: Chordata
- Class: Actinopterygii
- Division: Teleostei
- Order: Acanthuriformes
- Family: Chaetodontidae
- Genus: Chaetodon
- Subgenus: Chaetodon (Tetrachaetodon)
- Species: C. andamanensis

Binomial name
- Chaetodon andamanensis Kuiter & Debelius, 1999

= Chaetodon andamanensis =

Species of fish

Chaetodon andamanensis, commonly known as the Andaman butterflyfish, is a species of marine ray-finned fish, a butterflyfish belonging to the family Chaetodontidae. It is native to the Indian Ocean.

== Description ==
Chaetodon andamanensis is an overall bright yellow colour apart from a black band which runs from the top of the head and through the eyes, and a black ocellus on the caudal peduncle. The dorsal fin contains 1:4 spines and 18 soft rays while the anal fin has 4 spines and 16–18 soft rays. This species attains a maximum total length of 15 centimetres (5.9 in).

== Distribution ==
Chaetodon andamanensis is found in the eastern Indian Ocean where it has been recorded from Sri Lanka, southwestern India, the Andaman Islands, the Nicobar Islands, the Maldives; the Mergui Archipelago in Myanmar, the Similan Islands of Thailand and Weh Island off northwestern Sumatra in Indonesia.

== Habitat and biology ==
Chaetodon andamanensis is found in rock or coral reef habitats close to the shoreline or on the outer slopes. They can be solitary but are typically encountered in pairs or small aggregations. Their diet is mostly coral polyps. It is an oviparous species which forms pairs for breeding. it is thought that this species is a slow breeding fish which must have live branching coral to reproduce. They are found at depths between 1 and 10 metres (3.3 and 32.8 ft).

== Systematics ==
Chaetodon andamanensis was first formally described in 1999 by Rudie Kuiter and Helmut Debelius with the type locality given as Great Nicobar. Many authorities consider the Andaman butterflyfish a local colour morph of Chaetodon plebeius.

Like the other butterflyfishes with angular yellow bodies with black eyestripes and a single differently-colored patch, it belongs in the subgenus Tetrachaetodon. Among this group it seems to be the most basal living species. If Chaetodon is split up, this subgenus would be placed in Megaprotodon.
