= Smith's butterflyfish =

Conservation status
- Least Concern (IUCN 3.1)

Scientific classification
- Kingdom: Animalia
- Phylum: Chordata
- Class: Actinopterygii
- Order: Acanthuriformes
- Family: Chaetodontidae
- Genus: Chaetodon
- Subgenus: Lepidochaetodon
- Species: C. smithi

Binomial name
- Chaetodon smithi J. E. Randall, 1975

Species of fish

Smith's butterflyfish (Chaetodon smithi) is a species of marine ray-finned fish, a butterflyfish belonging to the family Chaetodontidae. This species is endemic to the south western Pacific Ocean.

== Description ==
Smith's butterflyfish has the anterior half of the body and associated fins are dark brown while the posterior half and fins are yellow. The posterior soft rayed part of the dorsal fin and the anal fin have blue margins. It attains a maximum total length of 18 centimetres (7.1 in). The separation of the two colour blocs on the body is irregular and the spines of the dorsal fin are also yellow over the brown anterior part of the body. It attains a maximum total length of 19 centimetres (7.5 in).

== Distribution ==
Smith's butterflyfish is endemic to the south western Pacific Ocean where it has only been recorded from the British Overseas Territory of Pitcairn Island and Rapa Iti and Marotiri, the Ilots de Basse, in French Polynesia. There has been a single confirmed record from Easter Island.

== Habitat and biology ==
Smith's butterflyfish occur on rocky reefs with dense growth of algae and at least a little coral. It is often encountered in large aggregations in the middle of the water column where they feed on zooplankton. This oviparous species forms pairs for breeding.

== Taxonomy and etymology ==
This species was described in 1975 by the American ichthyologist John Ernest Randall (1924-2020) with the type locality given as off Young's Rock, Pitcairn Island. The type specimens were collected by the ichthyologist C. Lavett Smith, Jr. (1927-2015) of the American Museum of Natural History and whom Randall honoured with its specific name.

== Utilisation ==
This species does appear in the aquarium trade but is extremely rare in that trade. It is on display at the Waikiki Aquarium.
