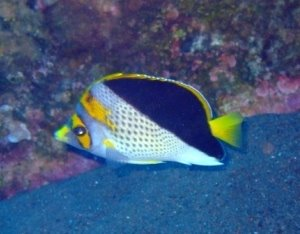

Conservation status
- Least Concern (IUCN 3.1)

Scientific classification
- Kingdom: Animalia
- Phylum: Chordata
- Class: Actinopterygii
- Order: Acanthuriformes
- Family: Chaetodontidae
- Genus: Chaetodon
- Subgenus: Rhombochaetodon
- Species: C. flavocoronatus

Binomial name
- Chaetodon flavocoronatus R. F. Myers, 1980

= Yellow-crowned butterflyfish =

Species of fish

The yellow-crowned butterflyfish (Chaetodon flavocoronatus) is a species of butterflyfish endemic to Guam and the Northern Mariana Islands.

The pattern of this species is that the body diagonally divided between the anterior ventral half which is silvery white, and the dorsal posterior jet black half. A flash of colour is given by two yellow bands, one through the eye and the other over the crown.

It is found at depths of over 30 metres (98 ft) in areas dominated by black coral. It is an oviparous species which forms pairs to breed. It feeds on zooplankton, tubeworms and other benthic invertebrates.
