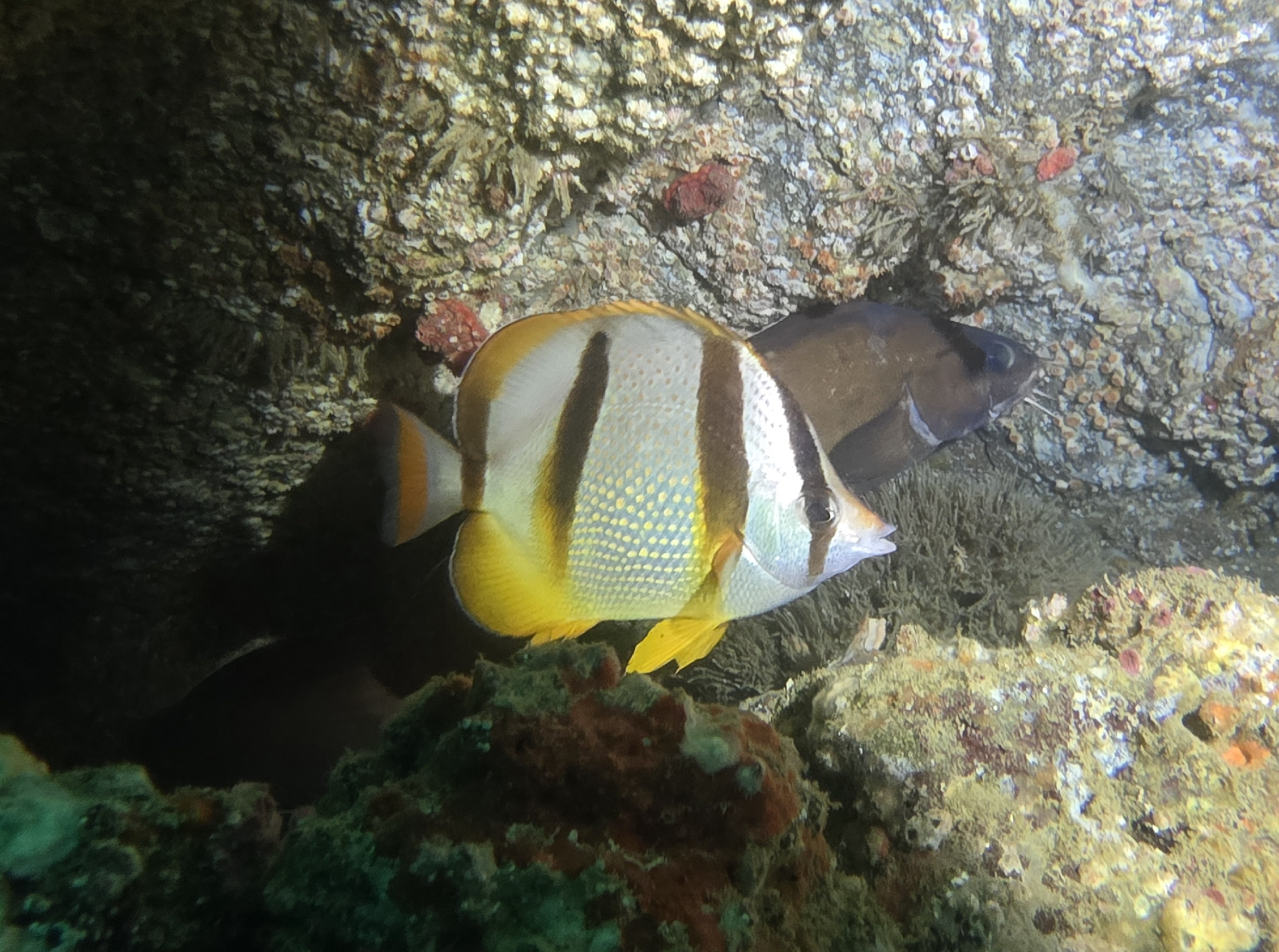

Conservation status
- Least Concern (IUCN 3.1)

Scientific classification
- Kingdom: Animalia
- Phylum: Chordata
- Class: Actinopterygii
- Division: Teleostei
- Order: Acanthuriformes
- Family: Chaetodontidae
- Genus: Chaetodon
- Species: C. hoefleri

Binomial name
- Chaetodon hoefleri Steindachner, 1881

= Chaetodon hoefleri =

Species of fish

Chaetodon hoefleri, the four-banded butterflyfish, is a species of marine ray-finned fish, a butterflyfish from the family Chaetodontidae. It is native to the tropical eastern Atlantic and has been recorded in the Mediterranean.

== Taxonomy and etymology ==
Chaetodon hoefleri was first formally described in 1881 by the Austrian ichthyologist Franz Steindachner (1834-1913) with its type locality given as Gorée in Senegal. The specific name honours the Steindachner's "dear friend" W. Höfler, who provided the type and who was supplied him with fish specimens from Africa.

== Distribution ==
Chaetodon hoefleri occurs in the tropical eastern Atlantic Ocean from Cap Blanc and Levrier Bay in Mauritania) south as far as the mouth of the Congo. It is also occurs around the Canary Islands. There have been a number of records in the western Mediterranean Sea.

== Description ==
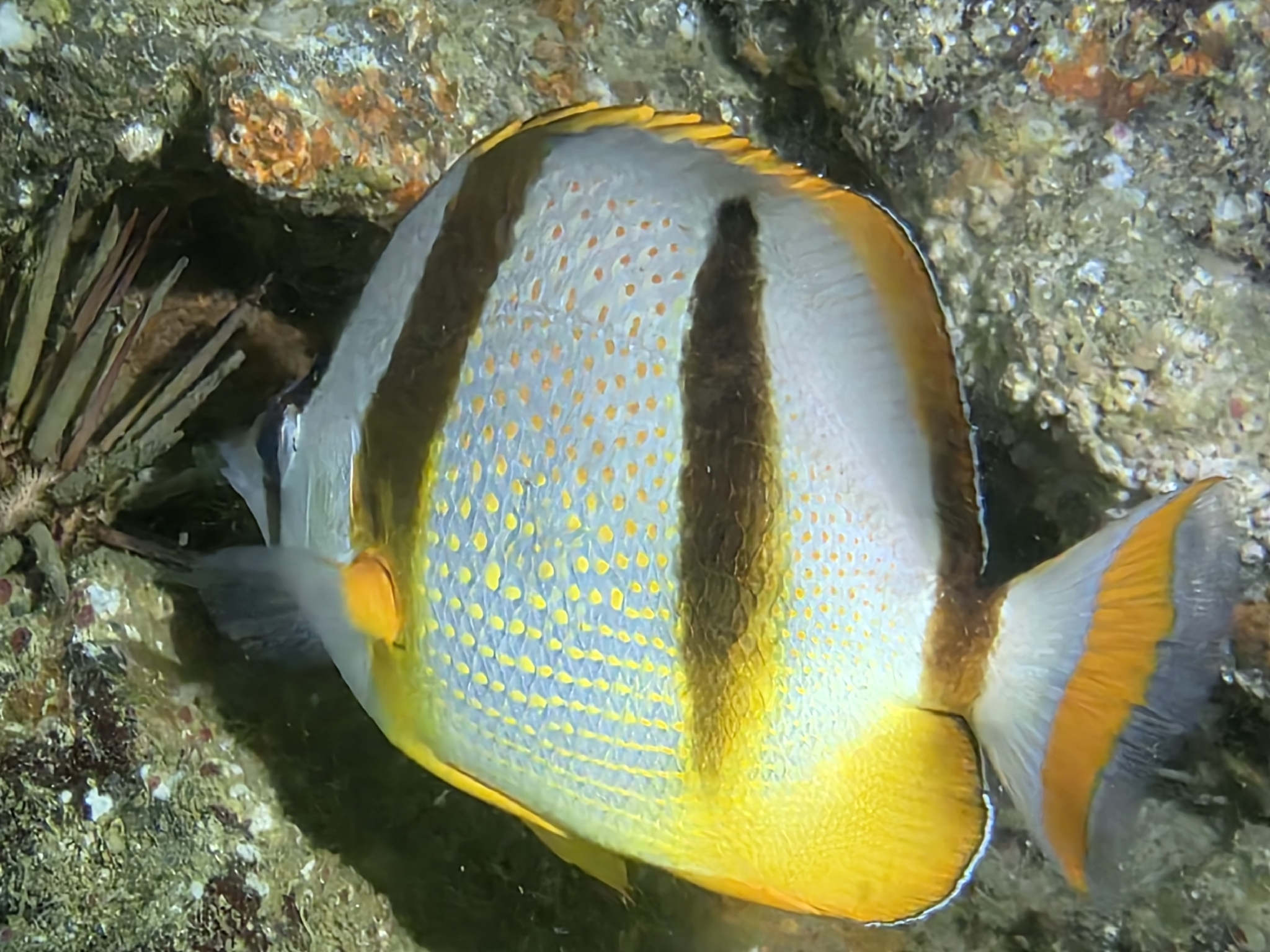
In Senegal

Chaetodon hoefleri has a rounded body shape with a short snout and rounded median fins. The head and body are largely yellowish in colour with copper tints. The body is marked with four vertical bars, the first bar is blackish and starts to the front of the first dorsal fin spine runs across the eye to the lower part of the back of the head. The second is dark brown in colour and starts between the third to fifth dorsal fin spines across the rear angle of the bill cover and base of the pectoral fins to the pelvic fins. The third bar is darker brown and runs from the last dorsal fin spines down towards the base of the anal fin at a slightly oblique angle, with an obvious black spot in its uppermost part. The fourth bar is darker than the others and could be described as blackish runs over the caudal peduncle. A black stripe runs between the eyes to the end of the short snout. The remainder of the upper part of head and the snout is orange. Every scale on the body has an orange horizontal stripe. The median fin spines and rays and the pelvic fin rays are yellowish to orange in colour. The soft rayed parts of the dorsal and anal fins usually have a white stripe on the inside of this. The pectoral fins are hyaline as is the caudal fin but this an orange crescent shaped crossbar in its centre. The dorsal fin contains 11 spines and 21-24 soft rays while the anal fin has 3 spines and 16-17 soft rays. This species attains a maximum total length of 27 centimetres (11 in), although 17 centimetres (6.7 in) is more common.

== Habitat and biology ==
Chaetodon hoefleri is a coastal species which has a preference for hard or rocky substrates. However, it has also been caught by trawlers over sand or mud substrates. It is a solitary fish, although it is often encountered in pairs as adults, although juveniles may be more gregarious when. They feed on benthic invertebrates. This is an oviparous species which forms pairs when breeding. It is found at depths of 20 to 100 metres (66 to 328 ft).

== Utilisation ==
Chaetodon hoefleri is rare in the aquarium trade.
