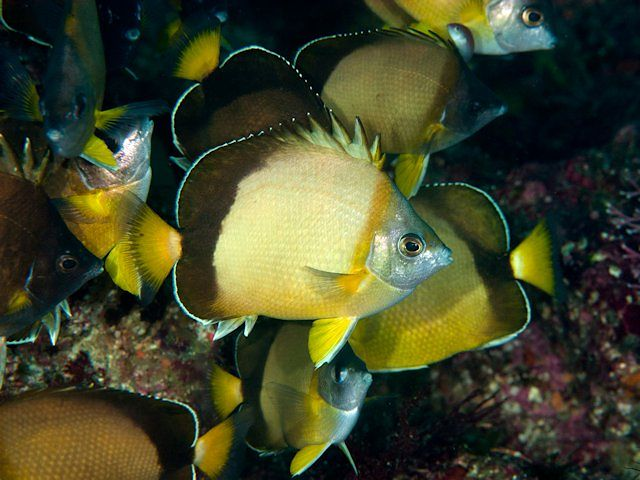

Conservation status
- Least Concern (IUCN 3.1)

Scientific classification
- Kingdom: Animalia
- Phylum: Chordata
- Class: Actinopterygii
- Order: Acanthuriformes
- Family: Chaetodontidae
- Genus: Chaetodon
- Subgenus: Lepidochaetodon
- Species: C. nippon

Binomial name
- Chaetodon nippon Steindachner & Döderlein, 1883

Synonyms
- Chaetodon carens Seale, 1910; Chaetodon decipiens Ahl, 1923

= Chaetodon nippon =

Species of fish

Chaetodon nippon, also known as the Japanese butterflyfish, is a species of butterflyfish found in the northwest Pacific Ocean in the shallow seas around Japan, South Korea, the Philippines and Taiwan.

== Description ==
The Japanese butterflyfish is a deep-bodied, vertically flattened fish up to 15 cm (6 in) long. The dorsal fin has 12 or 13 spines and 18 to 20 soft rays while the anal fin has 3 spines and 15 or 16 soft rays. The body is creamy-brown, rimmed with dark brown. The juvenile fish has an eyespot in the region of its soft dorsal fin, but this fades as it grows.

== Distribution and habitat ==
The Japanese butterflyfish is native to the northwestern Pacific Ocean, where it occurs in the waters of Japan, South Korea, the Philippines, and Taiwan. It is particularly common around the Izu Islands. With a preference for rocky coastal reef habitats, it has been recorded at depths of between 5 and 20 metres (16 and 66 ft), although it is probable that it also inhabits deeper water.

== Ecology ==
The Japanese butterflyfish is a benthic fish with an omnivorous diet, which includes polychaete worms, crabs and other small invertebrates. It often moves around in large or small groups.

Although many butterflyfish form aggregations when spawning, the Japanese butterflyfish have been observed spawning in pairs. This is one of the few species of butterflyfish whose larval development has been studied. On hatching, the larvae float upside down near the surface, but at 72 hours start swimming and feed on such zooplankton as oyster larvae. By the time they are ready to settle, the butterflyfish larvae are attracted to lights at night, and at this time, their colouring transforms into that of juvenile fish with great rapidity.

== Status ==
This fish has a fairly wide distribution and is a common species, particularly in the Izu Islands. It seldom appears in the aquarium trade and its population seems stable, so the International Union for Conservation of Nature has assessed its conservation status as being of "least concern".
