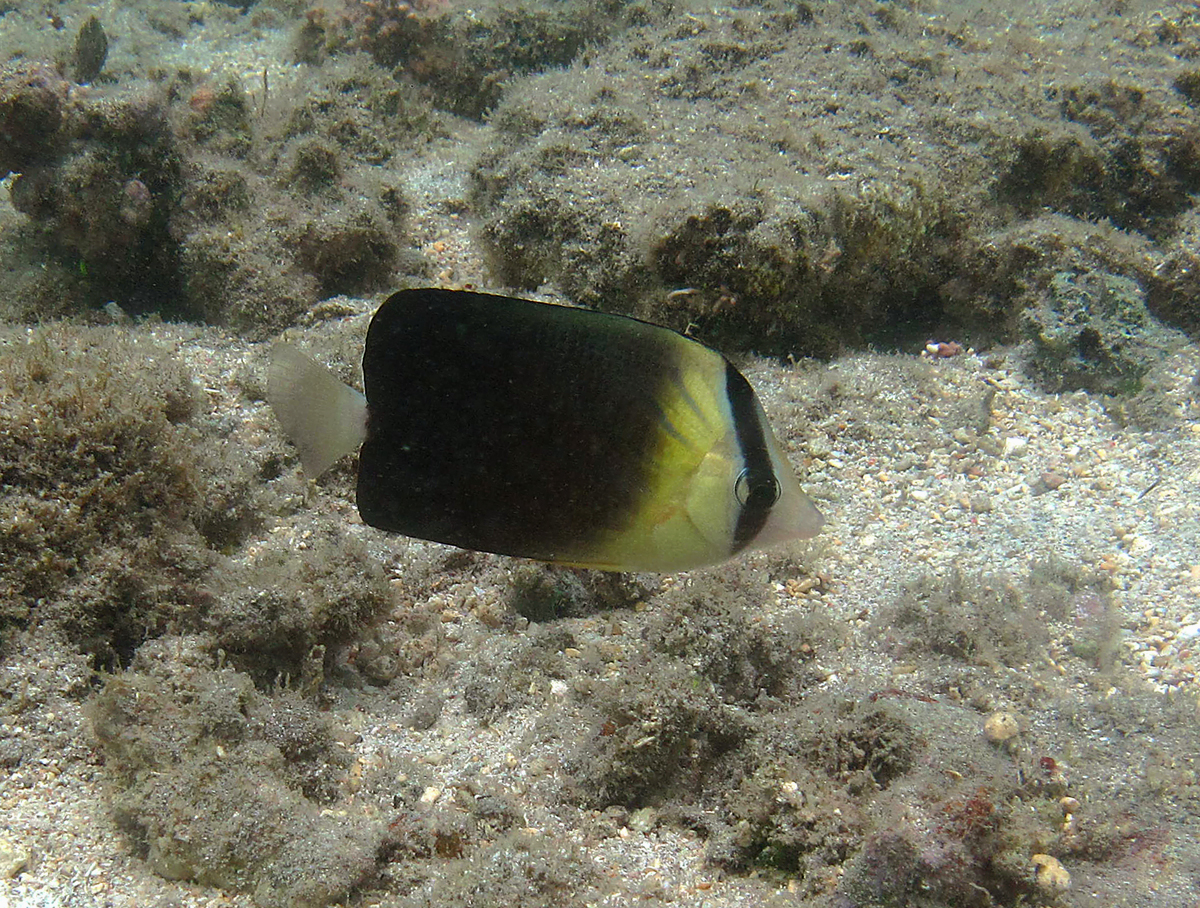

Conservation status
- Least Concern (IUCN 3.1)

Scientific classification
- Kingdom: Animalia
- Phylum: Chordata
- Class: Actinopterygii
- Order: Acanthuriformes
- Family: Chaetodontidae
- Genus: Chaetodon
- Subgenus: Rhombochaetodon
- Species: C. blackburnii

Binomial name
- Chaetodon blackburnii Desjardins, 1836

= Brownburnie =

Species of fish

The brownburnie (Chaetodon blackburnii), also known as Blackburn's butterflyfish or the rayed butterflyfish, is a species of marine ray-finned fish, a butterflyfish belonging to the family Chaetodontidae. It is found in the western Indian Ocean.

== Description ==
The brownburnie is rather drab when compared to many of its congeners. The body of this species is mainly brownish black with the head and front part of the body being bright yellow with a black vertical bar running across the eye. The dark colour extends onto the dorsal fin and the anal fin while the pelvic fins are bright yellow. The dorsal fin contains 16 spines and 21-23 soft rays while the anal fin has 3 spines and 17-18 soft rays. This species attains a maximum total length of 13 centimetres (5.1 in).

== Distribution ==
The brownburnie is found in the western Indian Ocean. It is distributed along the East African coast from Kenya in the north to the Mbhashe River in the Eastern Cape Province of South Africa. It has also been recorded from the French Southern and Antarctic Lands in the Mozambique Channel islands, Madagascar, Mauritius, Rodrigues and Réunion in the Indian Ocean.

== Habitat and biology ==
The brownburnie inhabits shallow rocky reefs and calm bays with limited growth of coral. They are found wither solitarily or in pairs. They are omnivorous and feed on benthic invertebrates such as bivalves, soft coral polyps, crustaceans and worms as well as zooplankton. it is an oviparous species in which the male and females mate as pairs.

== Taxonomy and etymology ==
The brownburnie was first formally described in 1836 by the French naturalist Julien Desjardins (1799-1840) with the type locality given as Mauritius. The specific name honours the English jurist Edward Berens Blackburn (1786-1839) who was the Chief Justice of Mauritius from 1824 to 1835 and president of the Société d'Histoire Naturelle de l'Ile Maurice (the Natural History Society of the island of Mauritius).

== Utilisation ==
The brownburnie is rarely seen in the aquarium trade because of its comparatively drab colouration.
