= Oman butterflyfish =

Conservation status
- Least Concern (IUCN 3.1)

Scientific classification
- Kingdom: Animalia
- Phylum: Chordata
- Class: Actinopterygii
- Order: Acanthuriformes
- Family: Chaetodontidae
- Genus: Chaetodon
- Species: C. dialeucos

Binomial name
- Chaetodon dialeucos Salm & Mee, 1989

Species of fish

The Oman butterflyfish (Chaetodon dialeucos) is a species of marine ray-finned fish, a butterflyfish belonging to the family Chaetodontidae. It is native to the northwestern Indian Ocean.

== Description ==
The Oman butterflyfish is a rather drab butterflyfish which has a greyish coloured body with the margins of the scales being dark brown. There is a broad, vertical white bar to the rear of the head and the mouth is white. The caudal fin is black which is slightly rounded. The dorsal fin contains 12 spines and 21-22 soft rays while the anal fin has 3 spines and 19 soft rays. This species grows to a maximum total length of 18 centimetres (7.1 in). Juveniles have a sharply defined white stripe to the rear of the eye and a white caudal fin.

== Distribution ==
The Oman butterflyfish is found in the northwestern Indian Ocean in the Arabian Sea along the southern coast of the Arabian Peninsula in Yemen and Oman.

== Habitat and biology ==
The Oman butterflyfish lives in rocky and coral reefs as well as on patches of coral on sloping seabeds made up is sand at depths of 5 to 25 metres (16 to 82 ft). Its diet is made up is coral polyps, sea anemones, worms, crustaceans, and algae. It is an oviparous species which forms pairs for spawning.

== Systematics ==
The Oman butterflyfish was first formally described in 1989 by Rodney V. Salm and Kevin Mee with the type locality given as southwest of Barr al Hikman in the Sultanate of Oman. Some authorities place this species within the large subgenus Rabdophorus but others consider it to be incertae sedis.
