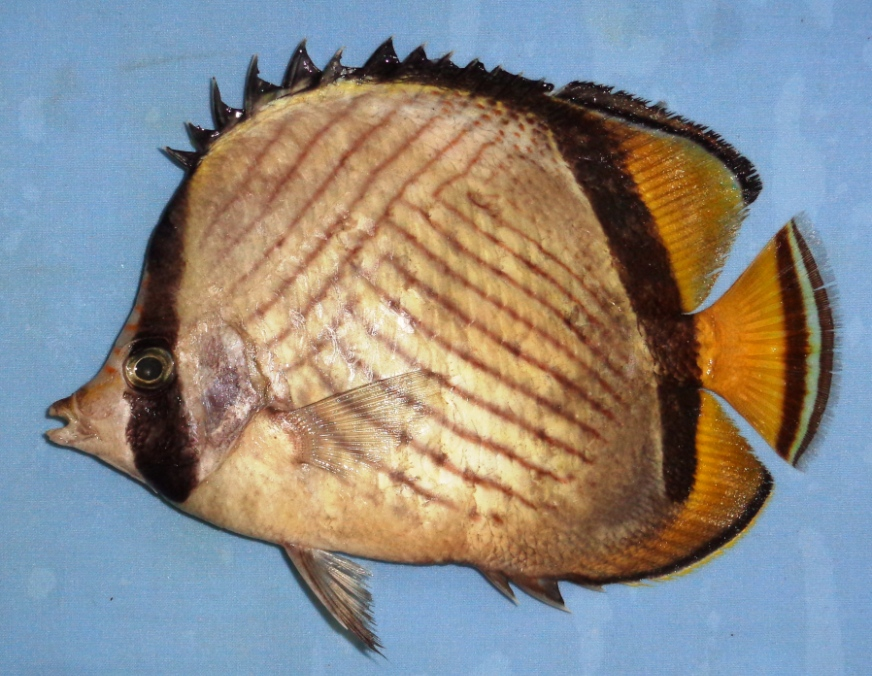

Conservation status
- Least Concern (IUCN 3.1)

Scientific classification
- Kingdom: Animalia
- Phylum: Chordata
- Class: Actinopterygii
- Order: Acanthuriformes
- Family: Chaetodontidae
- Genus: Chaetodon
- Subgenus: Chaetodon (Rabdophorus)
- Species: C. pictus

Binomial name
- Chaetodon pictus Forsskål, 1775

Synonyms
- Chaetodon vagabundus pictus Forsskål, 1775

= Chaetodon pictus =

Species of fish

Chaetodon pictus, the horseshoe butterflyfish, is a species of marine ray-finned fish, a butterflyfish belonging to the family Chaetodontidae. This species is found in the Red Sea, the Gulf of Aden and around Oman.

== Description ==
Chaetodon pictus has a white marked with oblique black lines which go from the eye to the dorsal fin base on the upper anterior part of the body and in the opposite direction elsewhere. The rear of the dorsal and anal fins is yellow. There is a black vertical band running through the eye from the front of the dorsal fin, which joins onto the black dorsal fin margin and this in turn joins the rear vertical black band, forming the horseshoe that gives this species its common name. The caudal fin is yellow with a vertical black band. The juveniles have a black spot on the posterior part of the dorsal fin. This species attains a maximum length of 18 centimetres (7.1 in). This species is similar to the vagabond butterflyfish (C. vagabundus) but has the black caudal fin bands coloured reddish brown instead and the soft parts of the dorsal and anal fins of adults have more obvious points.

== Distribution ==
Chaetodon pictus occurs in the northwestern Indian Ocean where it is found southern Red Sea, northern Gulf of Aden east to Oman and possibly as far east as Pakistan.

== Habitat and biology ==
Chaetodon pictus is found at depths of 1 to 30 metres (3.3 to 98.4 ft). It is encountered over most coral reef habitats, from inner coastal reefs to outward slopes. It can also occur on rocky reefs where there is dead coral. It is an oviparous species which breeds as pairs. This species feeds mainly on coral polyps and on algae.

== Systematics ==
Chaetodon pictus was first formally described in 1775 by the Swedish-speaking Finnish explorer, orientalist, naturalist Peter Forsskål (1732-1763), his description was published in 1775 by his companion on his expedition to Yemen, the orientalist and mathematician Carsten Niebuhr. The type locality was given as Al-Mukhā in Yemen. It belongs to the large subgenus Rabdophorus which might warrant recognition as a distinct genus. It is closely related to the vagabond butterflyfish and is treated as the same species by the aquarium trade.
