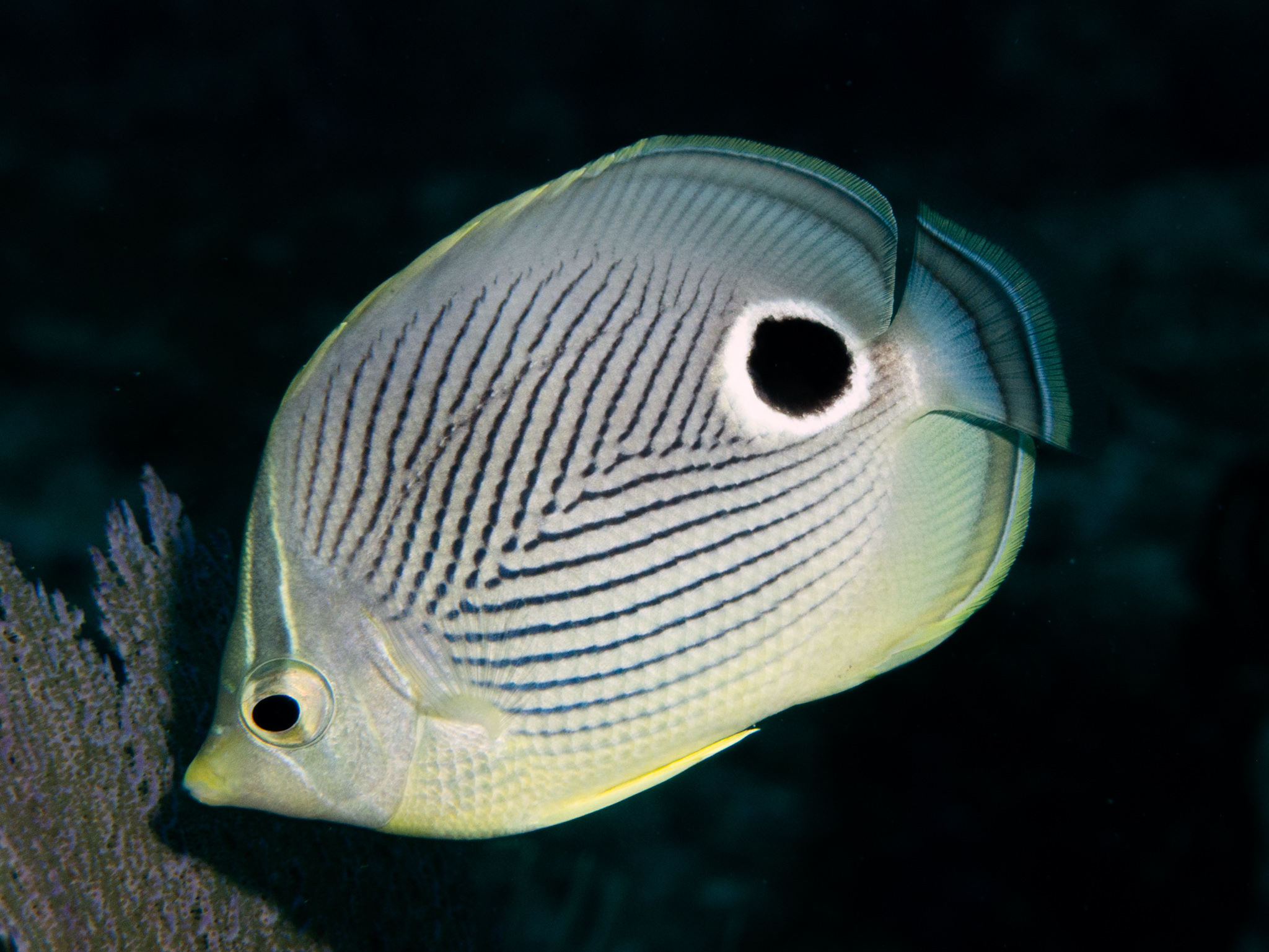
- Foureye butterflyfish (Chaetodon capistratus)

Scientific classification
- Kingdom: Animalia
- Phylum: Chordata
- Class: Actinopterygii
- Division: Teleostei
- Order: Acanthuriformes
- Family: Chaetodontidae
- Genus: Chaetodon; Linnaeus, 1758

Type species
- Chaetodon capistratus Linnaeus, 1758

Subgenera
- List: Chaetodon Linnaeus, 1758 "Citharoedus" Kaup, 1860 (non Herrmannsen, 1847: preoccupied) Corallochaetodon Burgess, 1978 Discochaetodon Nalbant, 1971 Exornator Nalbant, 1971 Gonochaetodon Bleeker, 1876 Lepidochaetodon Bleeker, 1876 Megaprotodon Guichenot, 1848 Rabdophorus Swainson, 1839 Rhombochaetodon Burgess, 1978 (disputed) Tetrachaetodon Weber & Beaufort, 1936 and see text

Synonyms
- List: Aspilurochaetodon Mauge & Bauchot, 1984; Burgessius Mauge & Bauchot, 1984; Chaetodontops Bleeker, 1876; Heterochaetodon Mauge & Bauchot, 1984; Roaops Mauge & Bauchot, 1984; Tifia Jordan in Jordan & Jordan, 1922

= Chaetodon =

Chaetodon Temporal range: 33.9–0 Ma Early Oligocene – recent

Genus of fishes

Chaetodon is a tropical fish genus in the family Chaetodontidae. Like their relatives, they are known as "butterflyfish". This genus is by far the largest among the Chaetodontidae, with about 90 living species included here, though most might warrant recognition as distinct genera.

== Taxonomy ==
=== Proposed subgenera ===
Several subgenera have been proposed for splitting out of this group. How the genus might be split up is becoming clear, with a range of DNA sequence data in large parts agreeing with S.D. Blum's landmark 1988 phylogenetic assessment of osteology.

Basically, a core group around the type species Chaetodon capistratus would remain in Chaetodon, while maybe four clades would be split off. These could use the names Lepidochaetodon, Megaprotodon, and Rabdophorus, and one unnamed group contains the three-banded butterflyfish (C. robustus) and its relatives. The monophyly of the Lepidochaetodon group is not fully established; whether Rhombochaetodon is a lineage distinct from Exornator and whether Lepidochaetodon is indeed closer to these than to any other Chaetodon, particularly to some lineages otherwise placed in Megaprotodon, are unclear.

Prognathodes, for some time contained in Chaetodon, is worthy of recognition as full genus, as is Roa.

Historically, more distantly related fish were placed in Chaetodon, too, for resembling them in details – e.g. the common scat Scatophagus argus, which has a similar shape and size, as well as armored larvae like the Chaetodontidae – or simply because they are colorful, smallish, and unusual-looking – e.g. the quite unrelated paradise fish, as C. chinensis.

The classification proposed in Fessler and Westneat is based on the species of Chaetodon they sampled and these sorted into the following clades:

Clades
Clade 1	Clade 2	Clade 3	Clade 4
C. robustus; C. hoefleri	C. kleini; C. unimaculatus; C. fremblii; C. burgessi; C. xanthurus; C. paucifasciatus; C. mertensi; C. quadrimaculatus; C. citrinellus; C. multicinctus; C. punctatofasciatus; C. pelewensis; C. sedentarius; C. dolosus; C. miliaris; C. guentheri	C. austriacus; C. trifasciatus; C. ornatissimus; C. reticularis; C. meyeri; C. larvatus; C. baronessa; C. trifascialis; C. rainfordi; C. octofasciatus; C. bennetti; C. plebius; C. speculum; C. zanzibarensis	C. austriacus; C. trifasciatus; C. ornatissimus; C. reticularis; C. meyeri; C. larvatus; C. baronessa; C. trifascialis; C. rainfordi; C. octofasciatus; C. bennetti; C. plebius; C. speculum; C. zanzibarensis

== Extant species ==
There are currently 87 recognized species in this genus:

=== Chaetodon sensu stricto ===
Species	Common name	Image
Chaetodon capistratus Linnaeus, 1758	Foureye butterflyfish	
Chaetodon ocellatus Bloch, 1787	Spotfin butterflyfish	
Chaetodon striatus Linnaeus, 1758	Banded butterflyfish	

=== C. robustus group ===
Species	Common name	Image
Chaetodon hoefleri Steindachner, 1881	Four-banded butterflyfish	
Chaetodon robustus Günther, 1860	Three-banded butterflyfish	

=== Lepidochaetodon group ===
Subgenus Exornator
Species	Common name	Image
Chaetodon citrinellus G. Cuvier, 1831	Speckled butterflyfish, Citron butterflyfish	
Chaetodon dolosus C. G. E. Ahl, 1923	African butterflyfish	
Chaetodon guentheri C. G. E. Ahl, 1923	Crochet butterflyfish	
Chaetodon guttatissimus E. T. Bennett, 1833	Peppered butterflyfish	
Chaetodon miliaris Quoy & Gaimard, 1825	Millet butterflyfish	
Chaetodon multicinctus A. Garrett, 1863	Pebbled butterflyfish	
Chaetodon pelewensis Kner, 1868	Sunset butterflyfish	
Chaetodon punctatofasciatus G. Cuvier, 1831	Spotband butterflyfish	
Chaetodon quadrimaculatus J. E. Gray, 1831	Fourspot butterflyfish	
Chaetodon sedentarius Poey, 1860	Reef butterflyfish	

*Nota bene: including Burgessius, Heterochaetodon and possibly Rhombochaetodon; tentatively placed here.

Subgenus Lepidochaetodon
Species	Common name	Image
Chaetodon daedalma D. S. Jordan & Fowler, 1902	Wrought-iron butterflyfish	
Chaetodon interruptus C. G. E. Ahl, 1923	Yellow teardrop butterflyfish	
Chaetodon kleinii Bloch, 1790	Sunburst butterflyfish, black-lipped butterflyfish, Klein's butterflyfish	
Chaetodon litus J. E. Randall & D. K. Caldwell, 1973	Easter Island butterflyfish	
Chaetodon nippon Steindachner & Döderlein (de), 1883	Japanese butterflyfish	
Chaetodon smithi J. E. Randall, 1975	Smith's butterflyfish	
Chaetodon trichrous Günther, 1874	Tahiti butterflyfish	
Chaetodon unimaculatus Bloch, 1787	Teardrop butterflyfish	

*Nota bene: including Tifia. C. daedalma, C. litus, C. nippon, and C. smithi are tentatively placed here.

Subgenus Rhombochaetodon
Species	Common name	Image
Chaetodon argentatus H. M. Smith & Radcliffe, 1911	Asian butterflyfish	
Chaetodon blackburnii Desjardins, 1836	Brownburnie	
Chaetodon burgessi G. R. Allen & Starck, 1973	Burgess' butterflyfish	
Chaetodon declivis J. E. Randall, 1975	Marquesas butterflyfish	
Chaetodon flavocoronatus R. F. Myers, 1980	Yellow-crowned butterflyfish	
Chaetodon fremblii E. T. Bennett	Blue-striped butterflyfish	
Chaetodon madagaskariensis C. G. E. Ahl, 1923	Seychelles butterflyfish	
Chaetodon mertensii G. Cuvier, 1831	Atoll butterflyfish	
Chaetodon mitratus Günther, 1860	Indian butterflyfish	
Chaetodon paucifasciatus C. G. E. Ahl, 1923	Eritrean butterflyfish, crown butterflyfish	
Chaetodon tinkeri L. P. Schultz, 1951	Hawaiian butterflyfish	
Chaetodon xanthurus Bleeker, 1857	Pearlscale butterflyfish, Philippines chevron butterflyfish, yellow-tailed butterflyfish	

Nota bene: including Roaops, might belong in Exornator; tentatively placed here. C. blackburnii, C. declivis, C. flavocoronatus, C. mitratus, and C. tinkeri tentatively placed here.

=== Megaprotodon group ===
Subgenus "Citharoedus"
Species	Common name	Image
Chaetodon meyeri Bloch & J. G. Schneider, 1801	Scrawled butterflyfish	
Chaetodon ornatissimus G. Cuvier, 1831	Ornate butterflyfish	
Chaetodon reticulatus G. Cuvier, 1831	Mailed butterflyfish	

Nota bene: tentatively placed here.

Subgenus Corallochaetodon
Species	Common name	Image
Chaetodon austriacus Rüppell, 1836	Blacktail butterflyfish, exquisite butterflyfish	
Chaetodon lunulatus Quoy & Gaimard, 1825	Redfin butterflyfish, oval butterflyfish	
Chaetodon melapterus Guichenot, 1863	Arabian butterflyfish	
Chaetodon trifasciatus M. Park, 1797	Indian redfin butterflyfish, melon butterflyfish	

Nota bene: tentatively placed here.

Subgenus Discochaetodon
Species	Common name	Image
Chaetodon aureofasciatus W. J. Macleay, 1878	Golden butterflyfish	
Chaetodon octofasciatus Bloch, 1787	Eightband butterflyfish	
Chaetodon rainfordi McCulloch, 1923	Rainford's butterflyfish	
Chaetodon tricinctus Waite, 1901	Three-striped butterflyfish	

Nota bene: C. tricinctus tentatively placed here in Discochaetodon.

Subgenus Gonochaetodon
Species	Common name	Image
Chaetodon baronessa G. Cuvier, 1829	Eastern triangle butterflyfish	
Chaetodon larvatus G. Cuvier, 1831	Hooded butterflyfish	
Chaetodon triangulum G. Cuvier, 1831	Triangle butterflyfish	

Nota bene: tentatively placed here.

Subgenus Megaprotodon
Species	Common name	Image
Chaetodon trifascialis Quoy & Gaimard, 1825	Chevron butterflyfish, triangulate butterflyfish, V-lined butterflyfish	

Subgenus Tetrachaetodon
Species	Common name	Image
Chaetodon andamanensis Kuiter & Debelius (de), 1999	Andaman butterflyfish	
Chaetodon bennetti G. Cuvier, 1831	Bluelashed butterflyfish	
Chaetodon plebeius G. Cuvier, 1831	Blue-blotched butterflyfish	
Chaetodon speculum G. Cuvier, 1831	Mirror butterflyfish	
Chaetodon zanzibarensis Playfair (fr), 1867	Zanzibar butterflyfish	

Nota bene: C. andamanensis is tentatively placed here in Tetrachaetodon.

=== Rabdophorus group ===
Species		Common name	Image
Aspilurochaetodon	Chaetodon gardineri Norman, 1939	Gardner's butterflyfish	
Aspilurochaetodon	Chaetodon leucopleura Playfair, 1867	Somali butterflyfish	
Aspilurochaetodon	Chaetodon selene Bleeker, 1853	Yellow-dotted butterflyfish	
Chaetodon adiergastos Seale, 1910		Philippine butterflyfish, Panda butterflyfish	
Chaetodon auriga Forsskål, 1775		Threadfin butterflyfish	
Chaetodon auripes D. S. Jordan & Snyder, 1901		Oriental butterflyfish	
Chaetodon collare Bloch, 1787		Redtail butterflyfish, Pakistani butterflyfish	
Chaetodon decussatus G. Cuvier, 1829		Indian vagabond butterflyfish	
Chaetodon ephippium G. Cuvier, 1831		Saddle butterflyfish	
Chaetodon falcula Bloch, 1795		Blackwedged butterflyfish	
Chaetodon fasciatus Forsskål, 1775		Red Sea raccoon butterflyfish, diagonal butterflyfish	
Chaetodon flavirostris Günther, 1874		Black butterflyfish	
Chaetodon lineolatus G. Cuvier, 1831		Lined butterflyfish	
Chaetodon lunula (Lacépède, 1802)		Raccoon butterflyfish, crescent-masked butterflyfish, lunule butterflyfish	
Chaetodon melannotus Bloch & J. G. Schneider, 1801		Blackback butterflyfish	
Chaetodon mesoleucos Forsskål, 1775		White-faced butterflyfish	
Chaetodon nigropunctatus Sauvage, 1880		Black-spotted butterflyfish	
Chaetodon ocellicaudus G. Cuvier, 1831		Spot-tail butterflyfish	
Chaetodon oxycephalus Bleeker, 1853		Spot-naped butterflyfish	
Chaetodon pictus Forsskål, 1775		Horseshoe butterflyfish	
Chaetodon rafflesii Anonymous [Bennett], 1830		Latticed butterflyfish	
Chaetodon semeion Bleeker, 1855		Dotted butterflyfish	
Chaetodon semilarvatus G. Cuvier, 1831		Bluecheek butterflyfish	
Chaetodon ulietensis G. Cuvier, 1831		Pacific double-saddle butterflyfish, false falcula butterflyfish	
Chaetodon vagabundus Linnaeus, 1758		Vagabond butterflyfish	
Chaetodon wiebeli Kaup, 1863		Hong Kong butterflyfish	
Chaetodon xanthocephalus E. T. Bennett, 1833		Yellowhead butterflyfish	

Nota bene: Including Aspilurochaetodon and Chaetodontops. C. auripes, C. gardineri, C. leucopleura, C. nigropunctatus, and C. xanthocephalus are tentatively placed in this group.

=== Incertae sedis ===
Species	Common name	Image
Chaetodon assarius Waite, 1905	West Australian butterflyfish	
Chaetodon dialeucos Salm & Mee, 1989	Oman butterflyfish	
Chaetodon humeralis Günther, 1860	Threebanded butterflyfish	
Chaetodon marleyi Regan, 1921	Doublesash butterflyfish	
Chaetodon sanctaehelenae Günther, 1868	Saint Helena butterflyfish	

Nota bene: most are probably either Chaetodon sensu stricto or C. robustus group.

== Fossil species ==
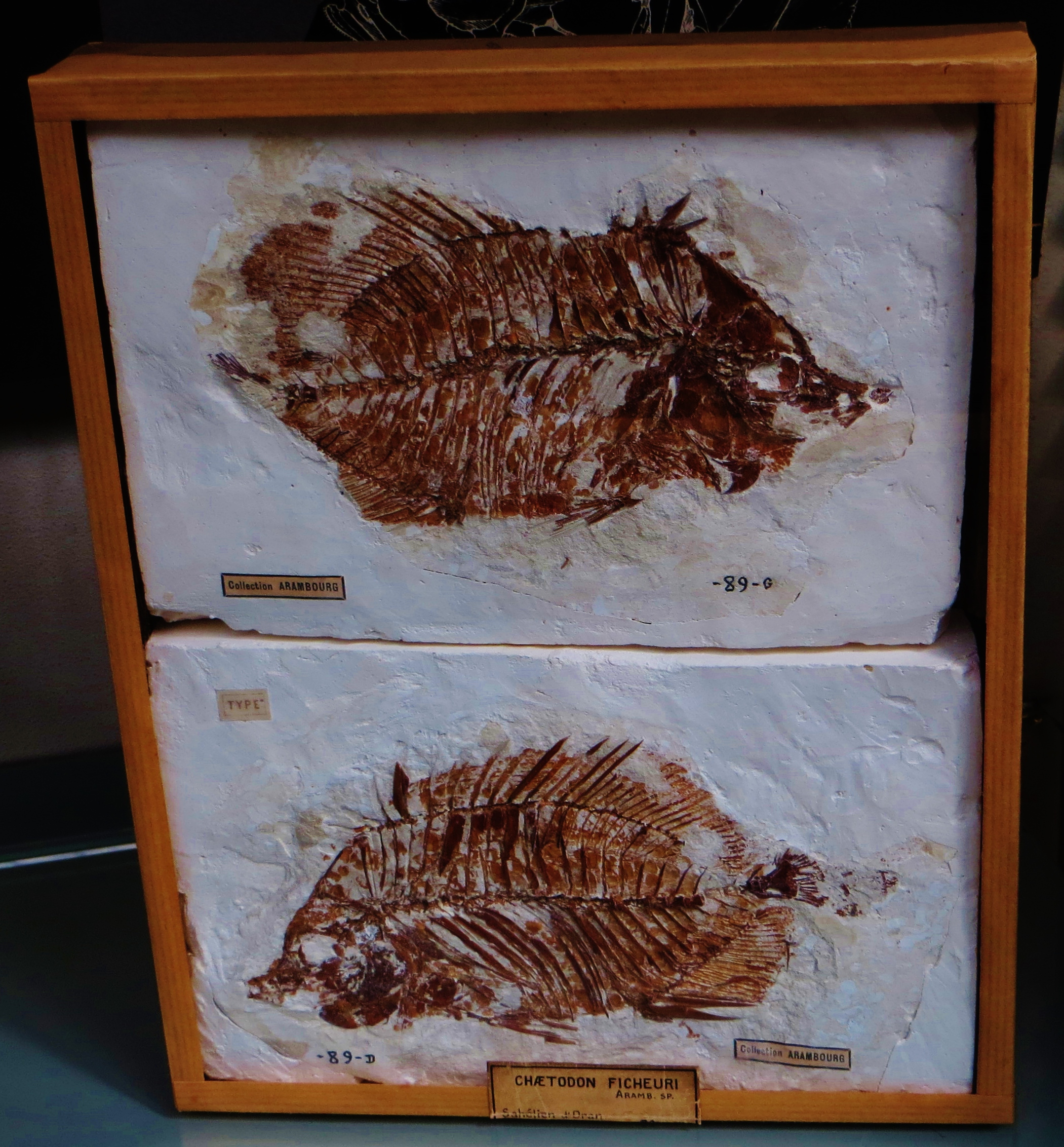
Fossil specimen of Chaetodon ficheuri

The following fossil species are known:

- Subgenus †Arambourgchaetodon
  - †Chaetodon ficheuri Arambourg, 1927 (Late Miocene of Algeria)
- Subgenus †Blumchaetodon
  - †Chaetodon wattsi Marramà, Giusberti & Carnevale, 2022 (Early Oligocene of Italy)

The species Chaetodon penniger Bogachev, 1964 from the late Oligocene of Azerbaijan cannot be confidently assigned to this genus due to the incompleteness of the fossil.

== Evolution & fossil record ==
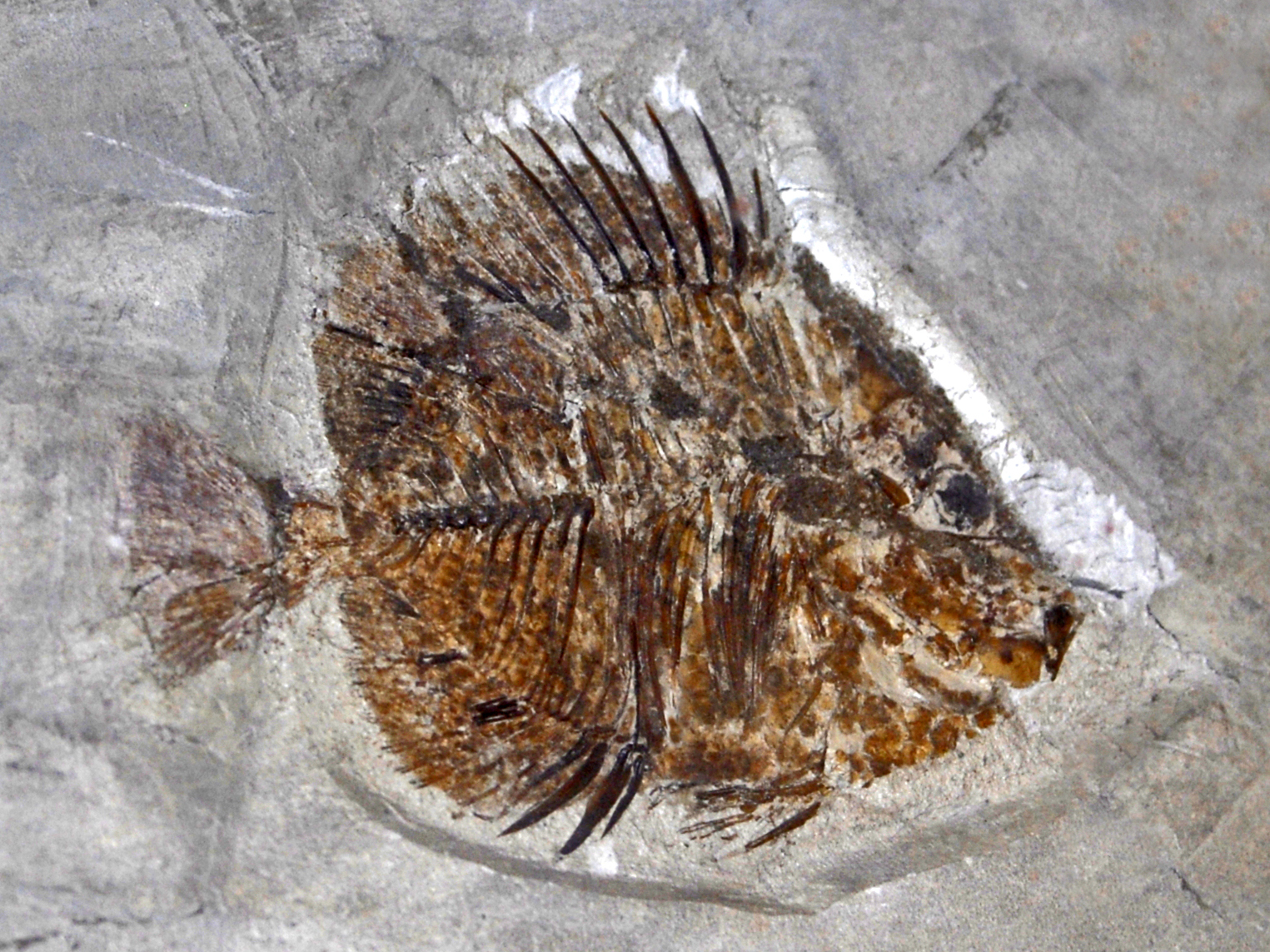
Fossil of Chaetodon species

The earliest confirmed specimens of Chaetodon are from Early Oligocene-aged coral reef deposits of Italy, belonging to the extinct species Chaetodon wattsi. This fossil is roughly concurrent when the family is thought to have radiated into its modern genus diversity. Indeterminate Chaetodon fossil specimens (including both articulated specimens and otoliths) referred to Chaetodon hoefleri are known from the Late Oligocene of Slovenia and the mid-late Miocene of Poland.

As it is not easy to distinguish this genus from close relatives, it may be that some Oligocene fossils are actually of other Chaetodontidae. The fossil record of this family is scant, with only Chelmon (or some similar genus like Chelmonops or Coradion) being known from Miocene remains. As even crude molecular clocks suggest that the ancestors of the Chaetodon and the Chelmops lineage diverged in the Late Eocene already, nothing more can be said without new fossils being discovered.
