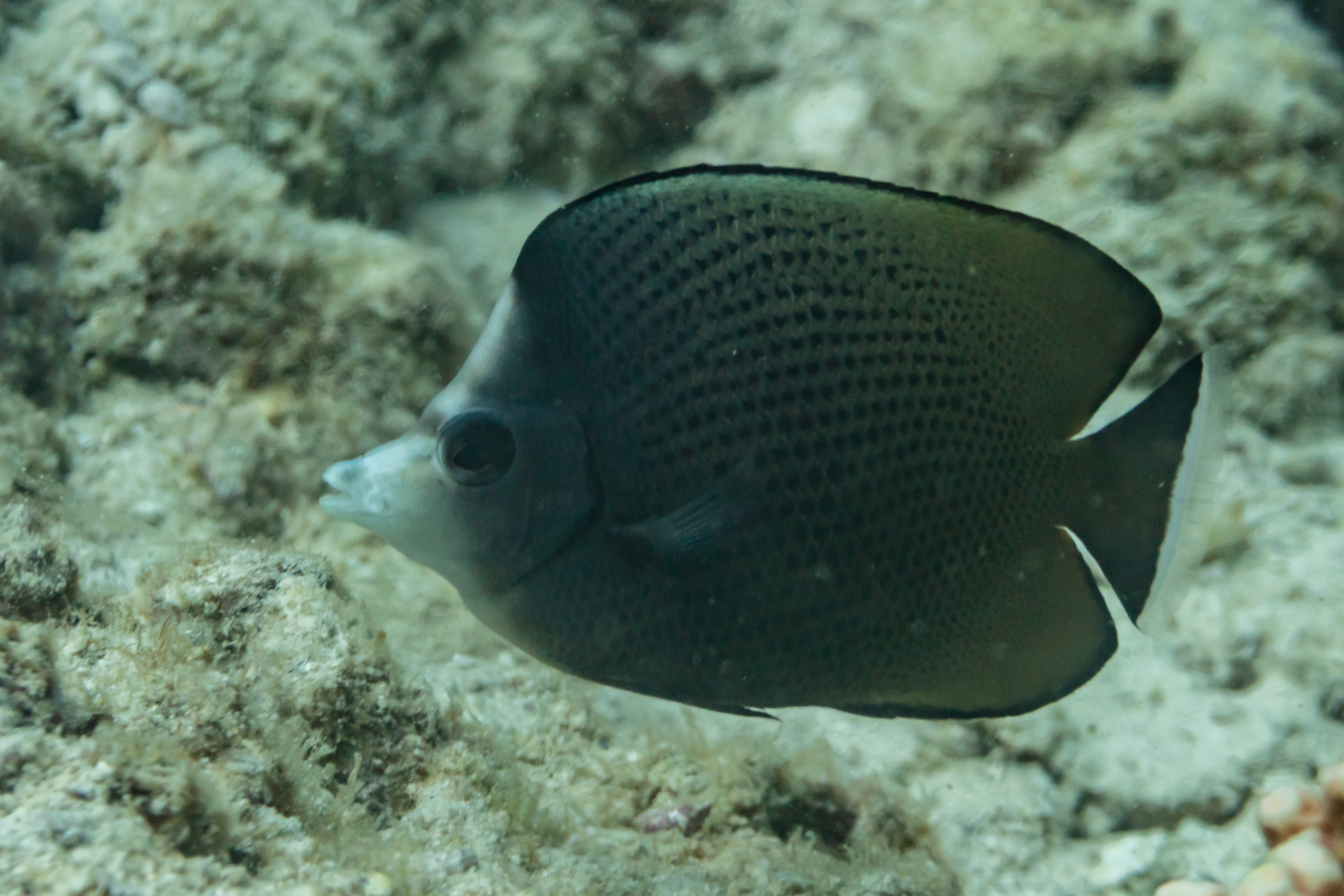

Conservation status
- Least Concern (IUCN 3.1)

- Vulnerable (IUCN 3.1) (Persian Gulf)

Scientific classification
- Kingdom: Animalia
- Phylum: Chordata
- Class: Actinopterygii
- Order: Acanthuriformes
- Family: Chaetodontidae
- Genus: Chaetodon
- Subgenus: Chaetodon (Rabdophorus)
- Species: C. nigropunctatus

Binomial name
- Chaetodon nigropunctatus Sauvage, 1880

Synonyms
- Chaetodon obscurus Boulenger, 1888

= Chaetodon nigropunctatus =

Species of fish

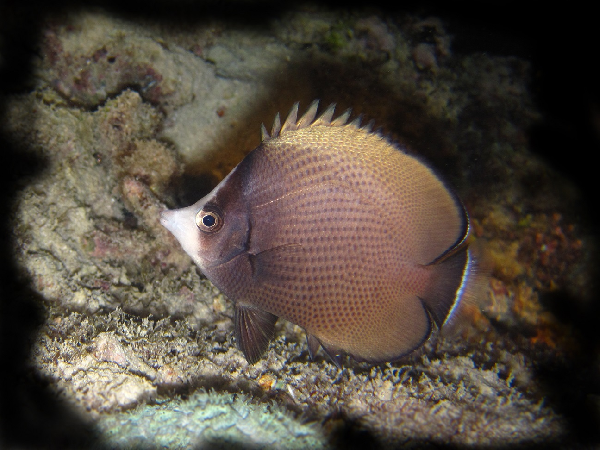
Iran

Chaetodon nigropunctatus, the black-dotted butterflyfish, is a species off marine ray-finned fish, a butterflyfish, belonging to the family Chaetodontidae. It is found in the north western Indian Ocean.

== Description ==
Chaetodon nigropunctatus has a whitish mouth set in a grey face, the colour of the body is greyish white and it is marked with many longitudinal rows of dark grey spots. The tail is black with a white margin. The dorsal fin has 13 spines and 21-23 soft rays while the anal fin has 3 spines and 18-20 soft rays. This species attains a maximum total length of 14 centimetres (5.5 in).

== Distribution ==
Chaetodon nigropunctatus is found in the northwestern Indian Ocean. It occurs in the Persian Gulf, Gulf of Oman and the Arabian Sea coast of the Arabian Peninsula.

== Habitat and biology ==
Chaetodon nigropunctatus occurs at depths between 1 and 40 metres (3.3 and 131.2 ft), inhabiting coral reefs where they occur in pairs. They are thought to feed mainly on coral polyps. it occurs over reefs, either of coral or rock, and sometime in Sandy lagoon areas.

== Systematics ==
Chaetodon nigropunctatus was first formally described in 1880 by the French paleontologist, ichthyologist, and herpetologist Henri Émile Sauvage (1842-1917) with the type locality was given as Oman. It belongs to the large subgenus Rabdophorus which might warrant recognition as a distinct genus.

== Utilisation ==
Chaetodon nigropunctatus is rare in the aquarium trade. However, it is a difficult species to keep in captivity due to its specialised diet of live coral polyps.
