= Marquesas butterflyfish =

Conservation status
- Least Concern (IUCN 3.1)

Scientific classification
- Kingdom: Animalia
- Phylum: Chordata
- Class: Actinopterygii
- Division: Teleostei
- Order: Acanthuriformes
- Family: Chaetodontidae
- Genus: Chaetodon
- Subgenus: Rhombochaetodon
- Species: C. declivis

Binomial name
- Chaetodon declivis Randall, 1975

Species of fish

The Marquesas butterflyfish (Chaetodon declivis) is a species of marine ray-finned fish, in the family Chaetodontidae, found in the central Pacific Ocean.

== Description ==
The Marquesas butterflyfish has a silvery-white body marked with black spots, with the upper posterior section featuring a blackish, wedge-shaped area. A yellow vertical band runs through the eye. The dorsal fin is yellowish-orange while the caudal fin is yellow. They are known to a total length of 12 centimetres (4.7 in).

== Distribution ==
The Marquesas butterflyfish is to the Central Pacific Ocean and is primarily found in the Line Islands in the United States Minor Outlying Islands, Phoenix Islands in French Polynesia and Kiribati and Marquesas in French Polynesia.

== Habitat and biology ==
This species inhabits rocky and sandy seabeds and is an oviparous species which forms pairs for breeding. It is found at depths of between 20 and 80 metres (66 and 262 ft). In the wild this omnivorous species feeds on coral polyps, fanworms, crustaceans, tunicates and algae.

== Taxonomy and etymology ==
The Marquesas butterflyfish was first formally described in 1975 by the American ichthyologist John Ernest Randall, the type locality was recorded as Hanauu Bay on Fatu Hiva in the Marquesas Islands. The specific species name, declivis, is derived from Latin, meaning "sloping", refers to the diagonally sloping dark patch on its upper body and fins. Populations of similar fishes in Marshall Islands are believed to be hybrids of C. declivis and butterflyfish (Chaetodon burgessi).

== Utilization ==
Historically, the Marquesas butterflyfish was collected for the aquarium trade, but its commercial demand has declined since 2006.
