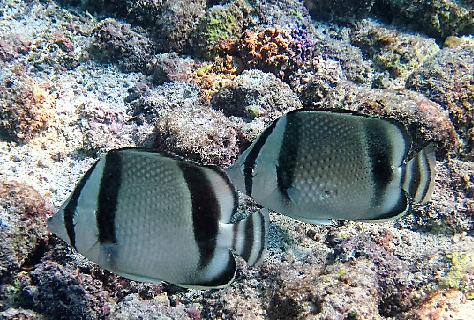

Conservation status
- Least Concern (IUCN 3.1)

Scientific classification
- Kingdom: Animalia
- Phylum: Chordata
- Class: Actinopterygii
- Division: Teleostei
- Order: Acanthuriformes
- Family: Chaetodontidae
- Genus: Chaetodon
- Species: C. humeralis

Binomial name
- Chaetodon humeralis Günther, 1860

= Chaetodon humeralis =

Species of fish

Chaetodon humeralis, the threebanded butterflyfish, is a species of marine ray-finned fish, a butterflyfish belonging to the family Chaetodontidae. It is found in the eastern Pacific Ocean.

== Taxonomy ==
Chaetodon humeralis was first formally described in 1860 by the German-born British zoologist Albert Günther (1830–1914) with the type locality given as "the Sandwich Islands" in error for Central America. Some authorities place this species within the nominate subgenus Chaetodon but others consider it to be incertae sedis.

== Distribution ==
Chaetodon humeralis is found in the Eastern Pacific Ocean, its most northerly occurrence is at Redondo Beach in Los Angeles, California and from there, its range extends south to Peru. It is also found around the Galapagos Islands of Ecuador, the Revillagigedo Islands of Mexico, Cocos Island in Costa Rica and Malpelo Island in Colombia.

== Description ==
Chaetodon humeralis has an oval disc-like body which is strongly compressed and it has a small mouth positioned at the end of a short snout. The colour of the body is white or silvery white with obvious brownish-black bands on the line of the pectoral fin and another running in from the base of the caudal fin, a third brownish-black band runs from the nape down through the eye to the throat. The median fins all have black bands through them. There are 12–13 spines and 18–20 soft rays in the dorsal fin while the anal fin contains 3 spines and 15–17 soft rays. The maximum total length reached is 25.4 centimetres (10.0 in) but 12 centimetres (4.7 in) is more typical.

== Habitat and biology ==
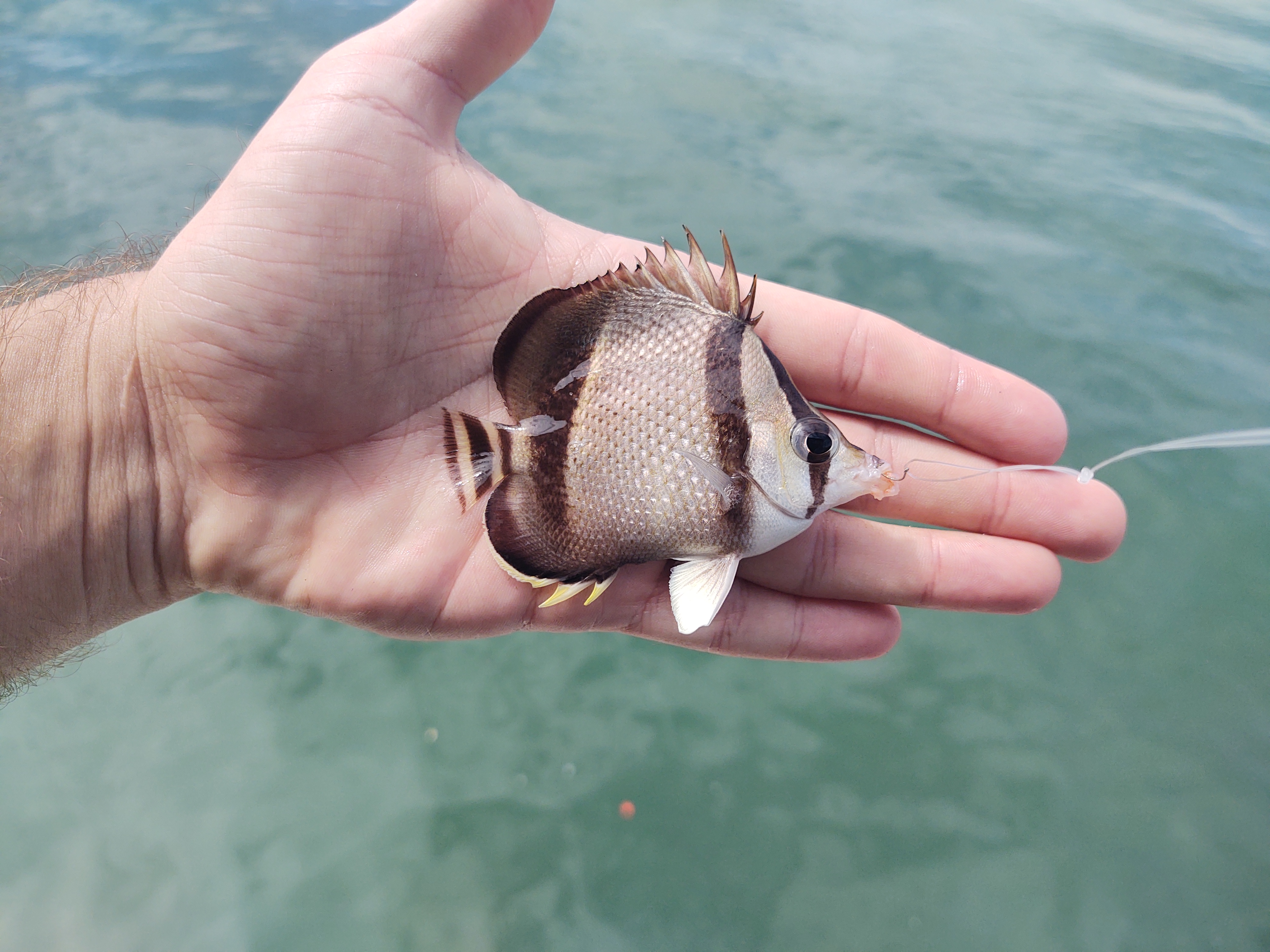
In Panama

Chaetodon humeralis is strongly associated with rock reefs but has been recorded over a variety of substrates in different parts of its range, including intertidal pools, mangroves and estuaries. It is normally encountered in pairs or small shoals, often near the shore. It will mix in shoals with the Pacific spadefish (Chaetodipterus zonatus). It forms pairs to spawn, laying pelagic eggs. It feeds on benthic invertebrates and algae. it has a depth range of 2 to 55 metres (6.6 to 180.4 ft) but is more common between 3 and 12 metres (9.8 and 39.4 ft).
