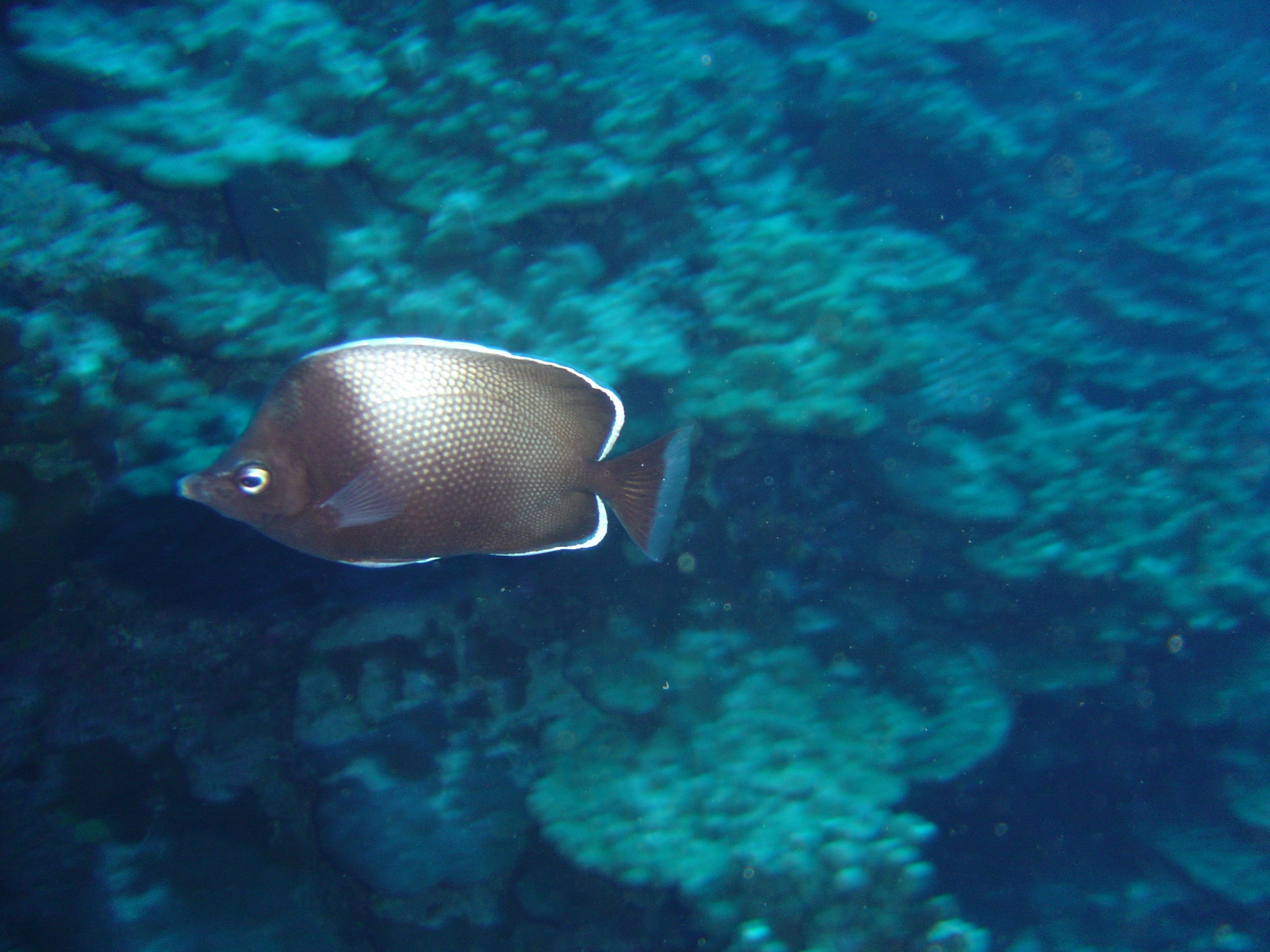

Conservation status
- Least Concern (IUCN 3.1)

Scientific classification
- Kingdom: Animalia
- Phylum: Chordata
- Class: Actinopterygii
- Order: Acanthuriformes
- Family: Chaetodontidae
- Genus: Chaetodon
- Subgenus: Lepidochaetodon
- Species: C. litus

Binomial name
- Chaetodon litus J. E. Randall & D. K. Caldwell, 1973

= Easter Island butterflyfish =

Species of fish

The Easter Island butterflyfish (Chaetodon litus) or white-tip butterflyfish, is a species of subtropical fish in the family Chaetodontidae. It is endemic to the seas around Easter Island, 3,500 kilometres (2,200 mi) off the coast of mainland Chile.

== Description ==
Butterflyfish have deep, laterally flattened bodies, a slightly upturned snout, uninterrupted dorsal fins and unforked, broadly wedge-shaped tail fins with flat ends. Chaetodon litus has a rectangular outline and is silvery-grey with white-edged scales. The maximum length is 15.5 cm (6 in) long. The dorsal fin has 13 spines and 23 to 25 soft rays while the anal fin has 3 spines and 19 or 20 soft rays.

== Distribution and habitat ==
The Easter Island butterflyfish is native to the waters around Easter Island and is found nowhere else. Its preferred habitat is on reefs and among volcanic boulders heavily clad in brown algae at depths down to about 20 metres (66 ft). Juvenile fish are sometimes found among corals in rock pools.

== Biology ==
Juvenile Easter Island butterflyfish have been observed to act as cleaner fish, picking parasites off the skin of larger fish. During the breeding season, male and female adult fish form pair bonds.

The Easter Island butterflyfish is a bottom feeding fish. Examination of its stomach contents have shown that it feeds on polychaete worms, shrimps, fish eggs and barnacles, and fragments of the black sponge Amphimedon sp. were also found. This was unexpected as butterfly fish are not known to feed on sponges, however the explanation may be that the sponge was ingested in error when the fish was feeding on the barnacles which had become entangled in the sponge.

== Status ==
At one time this fish was listed as "Vulnerable" by the International Union for Conservation of Nature in their Red List of Threatened Species but in 2010, this was changed to being of "Least Concern". The reason given for this change was that, although its range was very limited, this fish was quite common within that range and did not face any significant threats. A small number of fish were collected for the reef aquarium trade but the number was not believed to reduce the population to any great extent.
