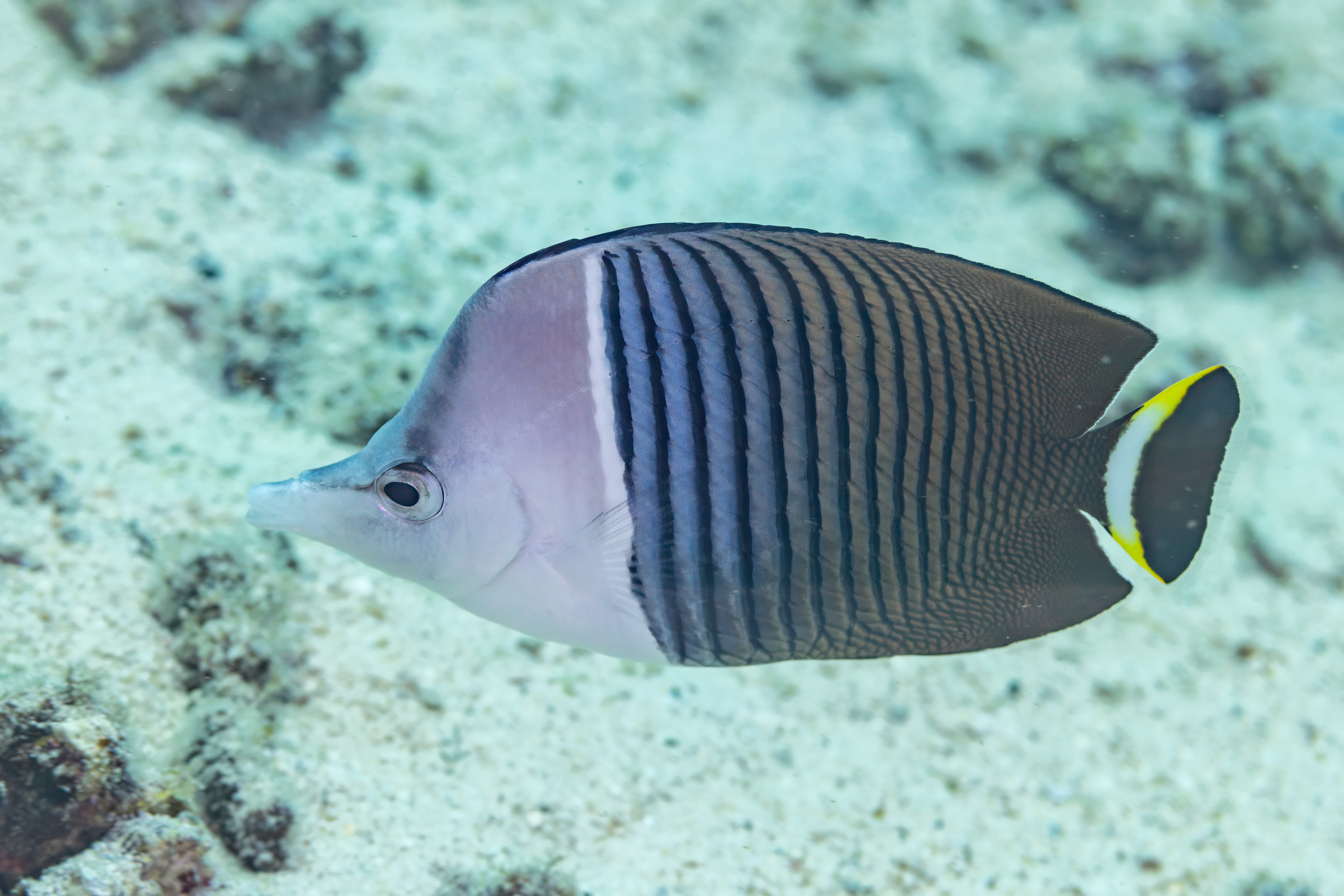

Conservation status
- Least Concern (IUCN 3.1)

Scientific classification
- Kingdom: Animalia
- Phylum: Chordata
- Class: Actinopterygii
- Order: Acanthuriformes
- Family: Chaetodontidae
- Genus: Chaetodon
- Subgenus: Chaetodon (Rabdophorus)
- Species: C. mesoleucos

Binomial name
- Chaetodon mesoleucos Forsskål, 1775

Synonyms
- Chaetodon hadjan Bloch & Schneider, 1801

= Chaetodon mesoleucos =

Species of fish

Chaetodon mesoleucos, the white-faced butterflyfish, is a species off marine ray-finned fish, a butterflyfish, belonging to the family Chaetodontidae. It is found in the north western Indian Ocean.

== Description ==
Chaetodon mesoleucos has a bluish white anterior part of the body with a vertical black band running through the eye. The rest of the body is pale grey in colour marked with numerous vertical black lines. The caudal fin is black with a white on the inner margin near the caudal peduncle. This species attains a maximum total length of 13 centimetres (5.1 in), although 12 centimetres (4.7 in) is more common.

== Distribution ==
Chaetodon mesoleucos is found in the northwestern Indian Ocean. It occurs from the central Red Sea, into the Gulf of Aden and around Socotra.

== Habitat and biology ==
Chaetodon mesoleucos occurs at depths between 1 and 25 metres (3.3 and 82.0 ft), inhabiting coral reefs where they occur in pairs. They are thought to feed mainly on coral polyps but will eat a variety of benthic invertebrates. Little is known about the biology of this species.

== Systematics ==
Chaetodon mesoleucos was first formally described in 1775 by the Swedish-speaking Finnish explorer, orientalist, naturalist Peter Forsskål (1732-1763), his description was published in 1775 by his companion on his expedition to Yemen, the orientalist and mathematician Carsten Niebuhr. The type locality was given as Al-Mukhā in Yemen. It belongs to the large subgenus Rabdophorus which might warrant recognition as a distinct genus.

== Utilisation ==
Chaetodon mesoleucos is uncommon in the aquarium trade. However, it is not a difficult species to keep in captivity.
