= Saint Helena butterflyfish =

Conservation status
- Least Concern (IUCN 3.1)

Scientific classification
- Kingdom: Animalia
- Phylum: Chordata
- Class: Actinopterygii
- Order: Acanthuriformes
- Family: Chaetodontidae
- Genus: Chaetodon
- Species: C. sanctaehelenae

Binomial name
- Chaetodon sanctaehelenae Günther, 1868

Species of fish

The Saint Helena butterflyfish (Chaetodon sanctaehelenae), also known as the cunningfish, is a species of marine ray-finned fish, a butterflyfish belonging to the family Chaetodontidae. It is found in the Atlantic Ocean around the islands of St Helena and Ascension Island.

== Description ==
The Saint Helena butterflyfish has a silvery-white body with a vertical black band running through the eye. The caudal peduncle is yellow, as are the dorsal and anal fins. The dorsal fin contains 13 spines and 21-23 soft rays while the anal fin has 3 spines and 19 soft rays. This species attains a maximum total length of 18 centimetres (7.1 in).

== Distribution ==
The Saint Helena butterflyfish is found in the southeastern Atlantic Ocean where it is endemic to the waters around the British Overseas Territories of Ascension and Saint Helena islands. Vagrants have reached as far north as Liberia and the Canary Islands.

== Habitat and biology ==
The Saint Helena butterflyfish is a common species of the shallow waters where it occurs. It is normally recorded in pairs or big shoals. It is an oviparous and monogamous species which forms pairs during spawning. Locally, this species is named cunningfish because it is able to nibble the bait from a hook while avoiding the hook. The juveniles of Thalassoma sanctaehelenae have been recorded acting as a cleaner fish, picking the parasites off this species. They frequently gather in shoals to feed on refuse tipped into the Saint Helena harbour. Normally they feed on benthic invertebrates.

== Systematics ==
The Saint Helena butterflyfish was first formally described 1868 by the German-born British zoologist Albert Günther (1830-1914). Some authorities place this species within the subgenus Exornator but others consider it to be incertae sedis.
