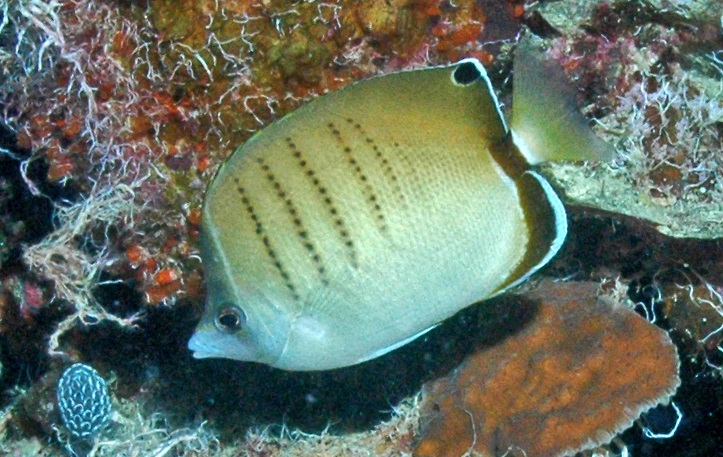

Conservation status
- Least Concern (IUCN 3.1)

Scientific classification
- Kingdom: Animalia
- Phylum: Chordata
- Class: Actinopterygii
- Division: Teleostei
- Order: Acanthuriformes
- Family: Chaetodontidae
- Genus: Chaetodon
- Species: C. assarius

Binomial name
- Chaetodon assarius Waite, 1905

= West Australian butterflyfish =

Species of fish

The West Australian butterflyfish (Chaetodon assarius), also known as the Western butterflyfish or assarius butterflyfish, is a species of marine ray-finned fish, a butterflyfish belonging to the family Chaetodontidae. It is native to the west coast of Australia.

== Description ==
The West Australian butterflyfish has a pale silvery-brown coloured body with a vertical dark band running through the eye. The upper two thirds of the body are marked with 5 vertical lines of close-set dots. There is a wide brown to blackish vertical band running across the caudal peduncle and then horizontally along the anal fin. The juveniles have an obvious black ocellus with white margins at the corner of the soft rayed part of the dorsal fin, this is retained in young adults but is lost as they age. The spiny part of the dorsal fin holds 12–13 spines while the soft-rayed part has 21–22 rays and the anal fin has 3 spines and 18–19 soft rays. This species attains a maximum total length of 15 centimetres (5.9 in).

== Distribution ==
The West Australian butterflyfish is endemic to Western Australia where it is found along the southern and western coast from southeast of Israelite Bay to Exmouth Gulf and the North West Shelf. it has recently been claimed to have been found in deep water in cold upwelling areas off Bali, but this is thought to be based on misidentified Chaetodon guentheri.

== Habitat and biology ==
The West Australian butterflyfish is found over rocky reefs and sandy flats with growth off weed. It occurs in aggregations and feeds on algae and zooplankton. It is an oviparous species which forms pairs to spawn.

== Systematics ==
The West Australian butterflyfish was first formally described in 1905 by the Australian ichthyologist Edgar Ravenswood Waite (1866–1928) with the type locality given as between Fremantle and Houtman Abrolhos. The specific name assarius means "browned", a reference to the colour and the griddle like markings. Some authorities make this species incertae sedis within the genus Chaetodon but others place it in the subgenus Exornator.
