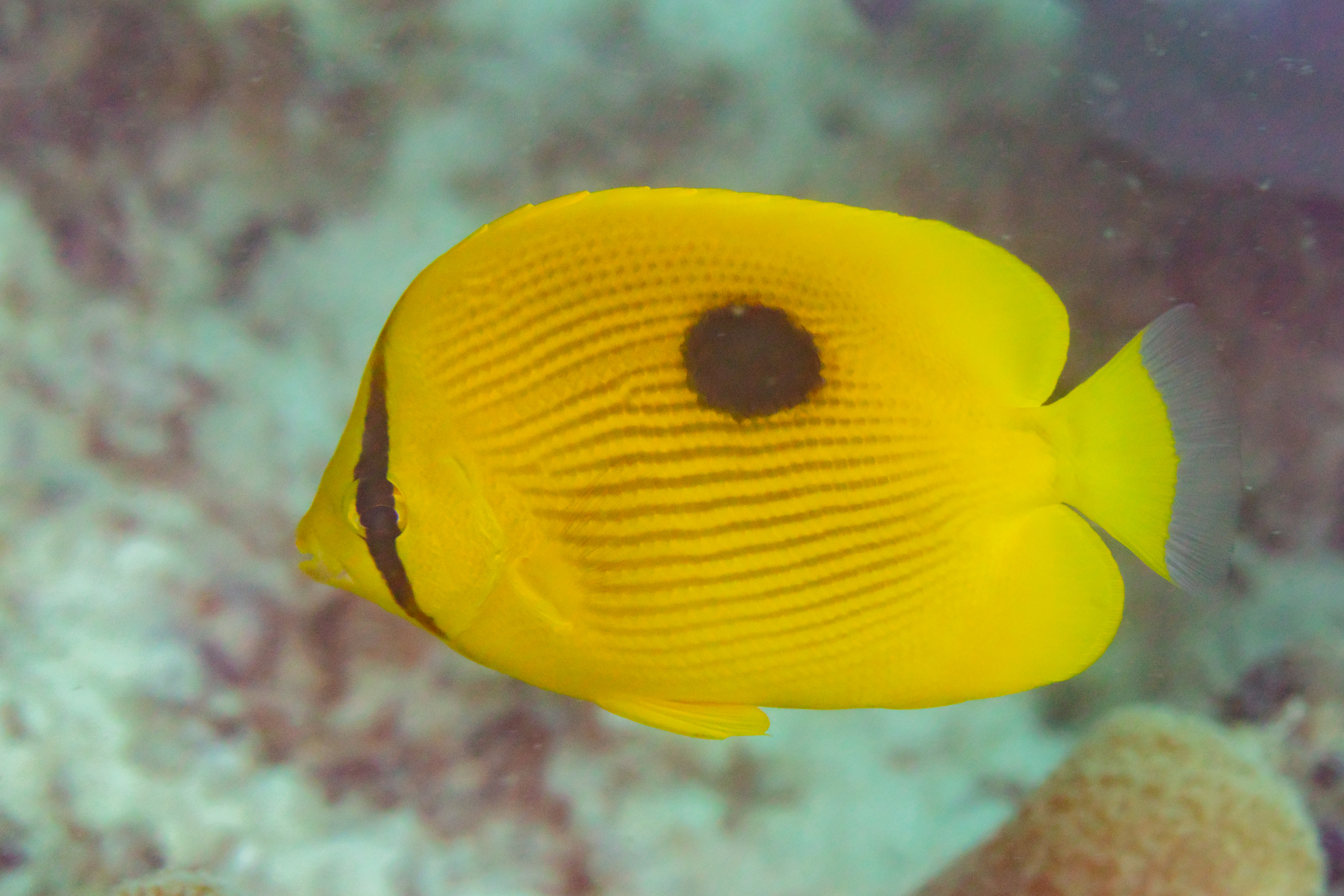

Conservation status
- Least Concern (IUCN 3.1)

Scientific classification
- Kingdom: Animalia
- Phylum: Chordata
- Class: Actinopterygii
- Division: Teleostei
- Order: Acanthuriformes
- Family: Chaetodontidae
- Genus: Chaetodon
- Subgenus: Chaetodon (Tetrachaetodon)
- Species: C. zanzibarensis

Binomial name
- Chaetodon zanzibarensis Playfair, 1867

= Chaetodon zanzibarensis =

Species of fish

Chaetodon zanzibarensis, the Zanzibar butterflyfish, is a species of marine ray-finned fish, a butterflyfish belonging to the family Chaetodontidae. It has a wide distribution throughout the western Indian Ocean stretching from the eastern coast of Africa to Madagascar, the Seychelles, Réunion and Mauritius. Its named after the Tanzanian island of Zanzibar.

== Description ==
The Zanzibar butterflyfish is one of the smaller members of its genus, growing to a length of about 12 cm (5 in). The dorsal fin has 13 to 14 spines and 15 to 17 soft rays while the anal fin has 3 spines and 15 to 17 soft rays. The overall colour of this fish is yellow. It has a large black spot on its upper flank, often with a whitish or bluish rim, and a vertical black bar through its eye. There are numerous faint dark, slightly curved stripes lining its sides.

== Distribution and habitat ==
The Zanzibar butterflyfish is native to the tropical waters of the western Indian Ocean. Its range includes the Chagos Archipelago, Comoros, Kenya, Madagascar, Mauritius, Mayotte, Mozambique, Réunion, Seychelles, Somalia, South Africa, Tanzania, and Yemen. It prefers lagoons and outer reef slopes at depths of from 1 to 40 m (3 to 131 ft).

== Ecology ==
Chaetodon zanzibarensis is a specialist feeder that consumes the polyps of scleractinian corals, particularly Acropora species. It may additionally feed on the tentacles of feather duster worms and Christmas tree worms. All these animals are alert to danger, and the fish uses its pectoral fins to twist and turn, to hover motionless and to dart forwards to nip off a mouthful of prey before the animal retracts its soft tissues. A study in the Chagos Archipelago in the Indian Ocean found that on coral-rich reefs, corallivores such as Chaetodon zanzibarensis dominated assemblies of butterflyfish. Despite being more vulnerable to habitat destruction and loss of the corals on which they depend, these fish seem better able to cope with minor disturbances than non-specialist feeders.

== Status ==
As a specialist feeder on corals, this species is likely to be affected by reef destruction and coral loss, though the part of the Indian Ocean in which this species is found is relatively unaffected by the coral losses associated with climate change in other parts of the world. Some individuals are collected for the aquarium trade but no other major threats are known, and the International Union for Conservation of Nature has assessed its conservation status as being of "least concern".
