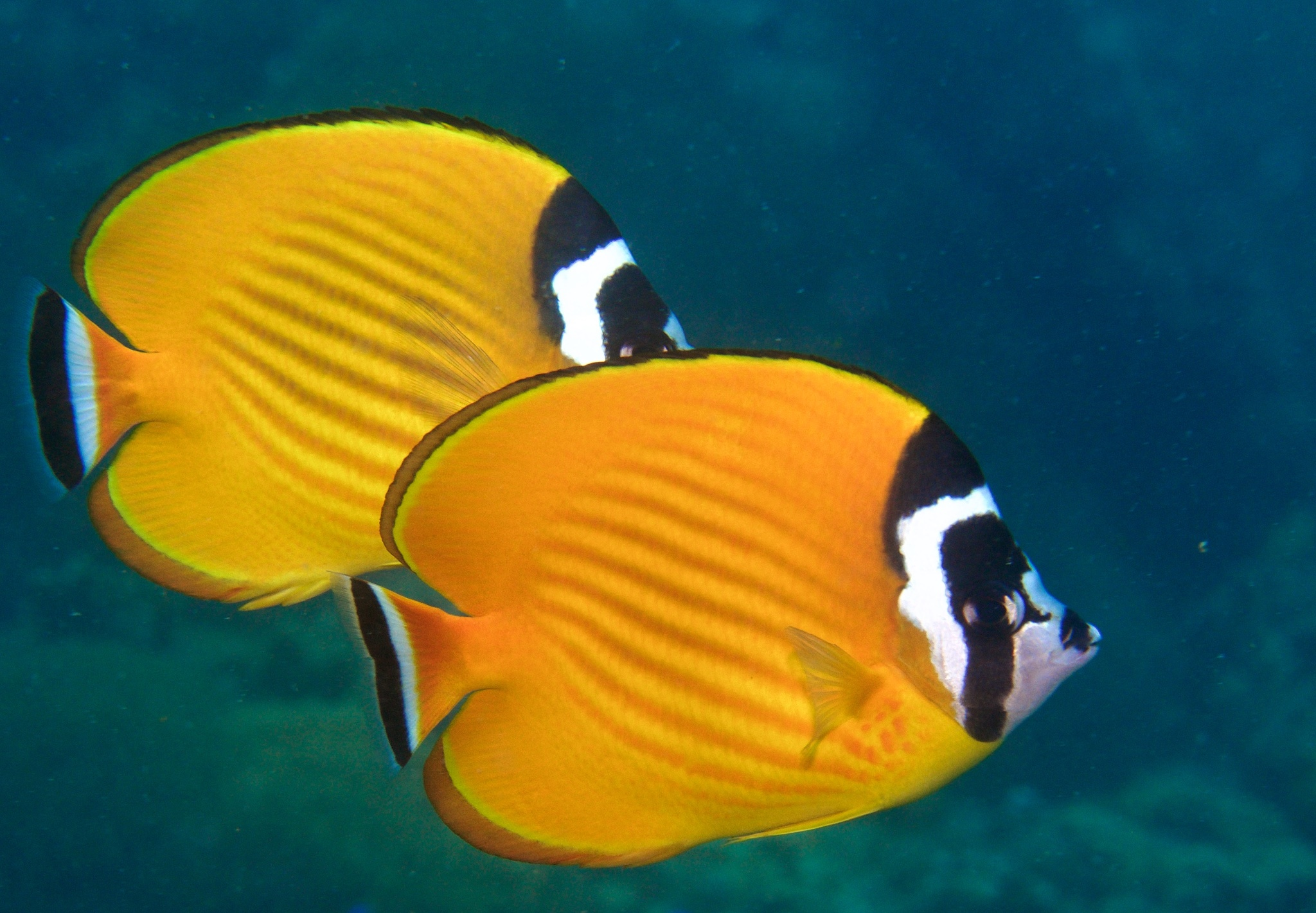

Conservation status
- Least Concern (IUCN 3.1)

Scientific classification
- Kingdom: Animalia
- Phylum: Chordata
- Class: Actinopterygii
- Order: Acanthuriformes
- Family: Chaetodontidae
- Genus: Chaetodon
- Subgenus: Chaetodon (Rabdophorus)
- Species: C. wiebeli

Binomial name
- Chaetodon wiebeli Kaup, 1863

Synonyms
- Chaetodon bellamaris Seale, 1914; Chaetodon collare knerii Ahl, 1923; Chaetodon frenatus Fowler, 1935

= Chaetodon wiebeli =

Species of fish

Chaetodon wiebeli, commonly known as the Hong Kong butterflyfish, Wiebel's butterflyfish or blackcap butterflyfish, is a species of marine ray-finned fish, a butterflyfish belonging to the family Chaetodontidae. It is native to the Western Pacific Ocean.

== Description ==
Chaetodon wiebeli has an oval shaped, deep and strongly compressed body with a head which is the same height as its width and a short snout with a small protractile mouth equipped with setiform teeth in its jaws. These teeth are referred to in the genus name Chaetodon which means "bristle tooth". It has a smooth preopercle which does not have any obvious spines. The colouration is mainly yellow marked with oblique brown lines. There is a vertical black band running through the eye, with a white bar to its rear, and a black blotch on the forehead. The dorsal, anal, pelvic and caudal fins are yellow, although the caudal fin has a black margin. The dorsal fin contains a total of 12–13 spines and 22–25 soft rays while the anal fin has 3 spines and 18–20 soft rays. This species attains a maximum total length of 19 centimetres (7.5 in).

== Distribution ==
Chaetodon wiebeli is found in the western Pacific Ocean from southern Japan and South Korea to northern Java, extending into the Gulf of Thailand.

== Habitat and biology ==
Chaetodon wiebeli is found in both rocky and coral reefs, where they are normally encountered in pairs and small shoals. They feed on coral polyps, benthic invertebrates and algae. This is an oviparous species which forms pairs during breeding. They may be solitary and their main feeding technique is grazing algae off rocks. They can ben found at depths of 4 to 25 metres (13 to 82 ft).

== Systematics ==
Chaetodon wiebeli was first formally described in 1863 by the German ichthyologist Johann Jakob Kaup (1803–1873) with the type locality given as Canton in China. The specific name honours Kaup's friend, the naturalist and one of the founders of the Zoological Museum in Hamburg, Karl Maximilian Wiebel (1808–1888). It belongs to the large subgenus Rabdophorus which might warrant recognition as a distinct genus.
