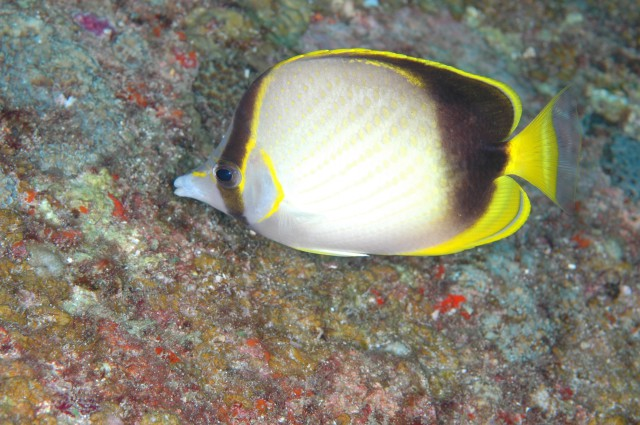

Conservation status
- Least Concern (IUCN 3.1)

Scientific classification
- Kingdom: Animalia
- Phylum: Chordata
- Class: Actinopterygii
- Division: Teleostei
- Order: Acanthuriformes
- Family: Chaetodontidae
- Genus: Chaetodon
- Subgenus: Chaetodon (Rabdophorus)
- Species: C. gardineri

Binomial name
- Chaetodon gardineri Norman, 1939

= Chaetodon gardineri =

Species of fish

Chaetodon gardineri, Gardiner's butterflyfish, is a species of marine ray-finned fish, a butterflyfish belonging to the family Chaetodontidae. It is native to the Indian Ocean.

== Description ==
Chaetodon gardineri has a body which is an overall whitish colour with a black vertical band running through the eye and a black posterior to the body. The dorsal fin is black with a yellow margin, while the anal and caudal fins are yellow. The dorsal fin contains 12 spines and 20–22 soft rays while the anal fin has 3 spines and 18–19 soft rays. This species attains a maximum total length of 17 centimetres (6.7 in).

== Distribution ==
Chaetodon gardineri is found in the Indian Ocean from Socotra and the Gulf of Aden and along the coastlines of the Arabian Sea from Oman to Sri Lanka. It has been recorded off northern Sumatra but this is regarded as vagrancy.

== Habitat and biology ==
Chaetodon gardineri is found at depths of 2 to 65 metres (6.6 to 213.3 ft), but it is typically encountered at depths of more than 25 metres (82 ft). They are found on reefs on the shallow part of the continental shelf. They are most often recorded as pairs. They breed in pairs and are oviparous. They are omnivorous, feeding on algae, the polyps of stony corals, worms, hydroids, tunicates, crustaceans and other benthic invertebrates.

== Systematics ==
Chaetodon gardineri was first formally described in 1939 by the English ichthyologist John Roxborough Norman (1898–1944) with the type locality given as Muscat. The specific name honours British zoologist John Stanley Gardiner (1872–1946) who was Secretary to the Committee of the John Murray Expedition to the Indian Ocean in 1933–34, on which the type of this species was collected. This species is tentatively placed in the large subgenus Rabdophorus which might warrant recognition as a distinct genus.
