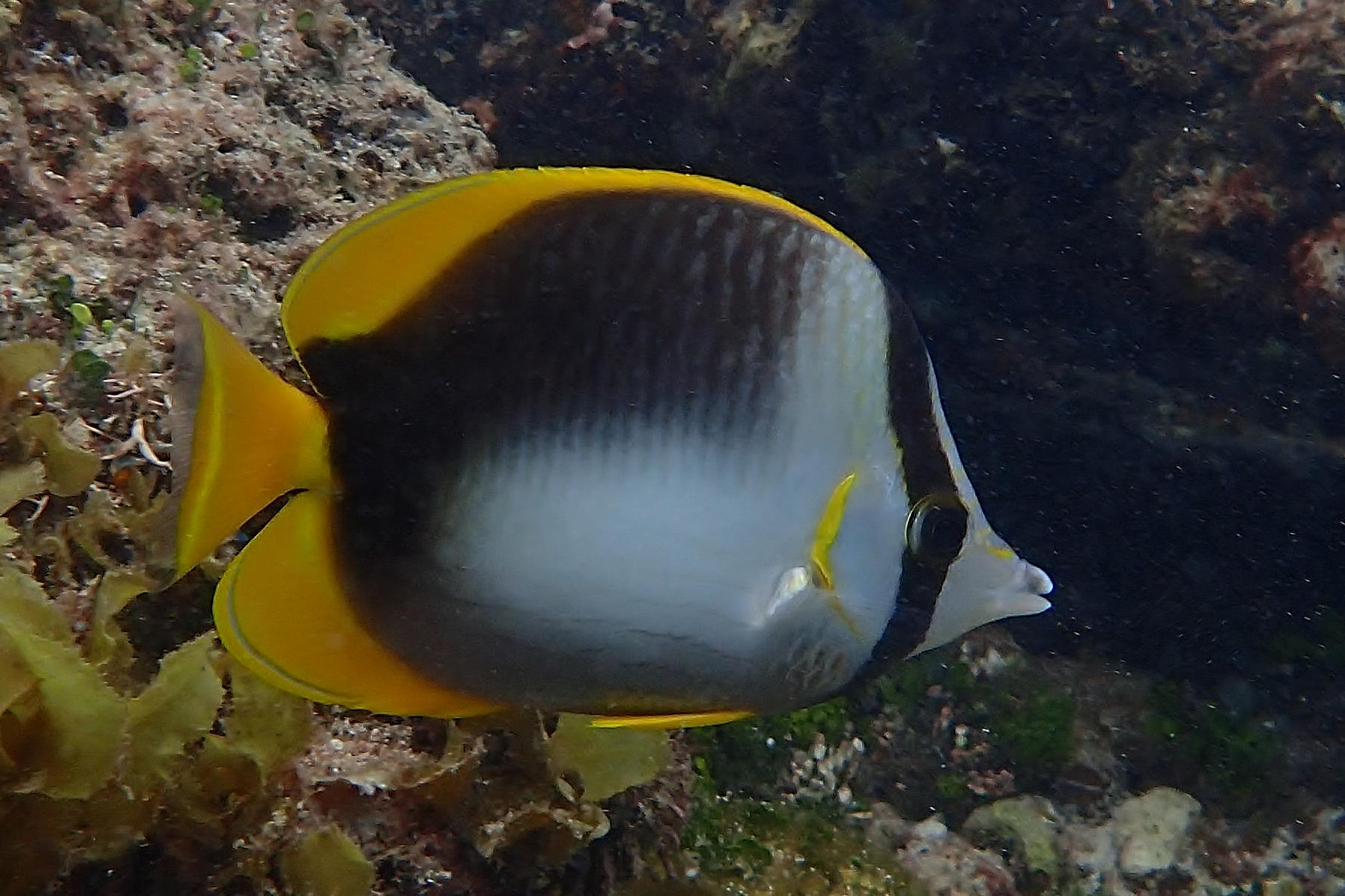

Conservation status
- Least Concern (IUCN 3.1)

Scientific classification
- Kingdom: Animalia
- Phylum: Chordata
- Class: Actinopterygii
- Order: Acanthuriformes
- Family: Chaetodontidae
- Genus: Chaetodon
- Subgenus: Chaetodon (Rabdophorus)
- Species: C. leucopleura

Binomial name
- Chaetodon leucopleura Playfair, 1867

Synonyms
- Chaetodon leucopygus Ahl, 1923

= Chaetodon leucopleura =

Species of fish

Chaetodon leucopleura, the Somali butterflyfish, is a species of marine ray-finned fish, a butterflyfish belonging to the family Chaetodontidae. It is found in the northwestern Indian Ocean.

== Description ==
Chaetodon leucopleura has a laterally compressed and oval shaped body with a pointed snout as is typical for butterflyfish. The lower part of the body is white while the upper part being dark greyish black. They have a yellow curved line along the margin of the operculum and a black bar running through the eye. There are 5–6 thin, horizontal lines between the eyes and the upper lips are black. The fins are yellow. The dorsal fin has 12 spines and 21–23 soft rays while the anal fin contains 3 spines and 18–19 soft rays. This species attains a maximum standard length of 18 centimetres (7.1 in).

== Distribution ==
Chaetodon leucopleura is found in the northwestern Indian Ocean, it occurs in the along the East African coast from Sudan south to Zanzibar, the island of Socotra, the Seychelles south to Aldabra. In the southern Red Sea it is found around the Farasan Islands of Saudi Arabia and off Yemen.

== Habitat and biology ==
Chaetodon leucopleura appears to have a preference for deeper water and is found at depths of 7 to 80 metres (23 to 262 ft). They occur on deep coral rich reefs, frequently close to the base of slopes over coral scree. They are typically encountered either solitarily or as pairs over open bottoms. It is an uncommon species. They form pairs for breeding and are oviparous. Their diet consists of coral polyps and benthic invertebrates.

== Systematics ==
Chaetodon leucopleura was first formally described in 1867 by the Scots naturalist Lambert Playfair (1828–1899) with the type locality given as Zanzibar. This species is tentatively placed in the large subgenus Rabdophorus which might warrant recognition as a distinct genus.
