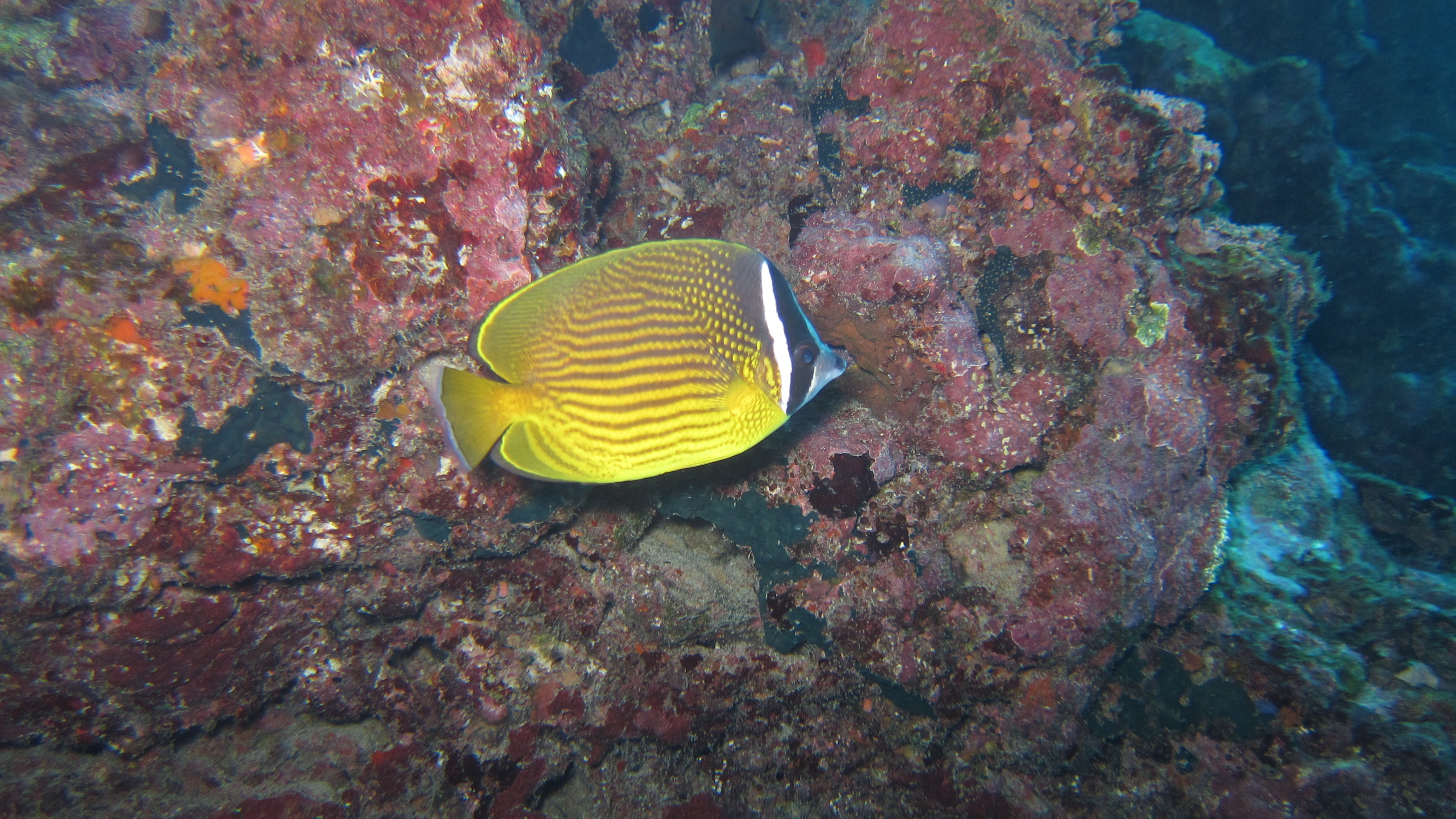

Conservation status
- Least Concern (IUCN 3.1)

Scientific classification
- Kingdom: Animalia
- Phylum: Chordata
- Class: Actinopterygii
- Division: Teleostei
- Order: Acanthuriformes
- Family: Chaetodontidae
- Genus: Chaetodon
- Subgenus: Chaetodon (Rabdophorus)
- Species: C. auripes

Binomial name
- Chaetodon auripes Jordan & Snyder, 1901

Synonyms
- Chaetodon aureus Temminck & Schlegel, 1844; Chaetodon fallax Ahl, 1923; Chaetodon dorsiocellatus Ahl, 1923

= Chaetodon auripes =

Species of fish

Chaetodon auripes, the oriental butterflyfish, is a species of marine ray-finned fish in the butterflyfish family Chaetodontidae. It is found in the western Pacific Ocean, off the coasts of East Asia.

== Taxonomy ==
Chaetodon auripes was first formally described in 1901 by the American ichthyologists David Starr Jordan and John Otterbein Snyder with the type locality given as Nagasaki. Within its genus, this species belongs to the large subgenus Rabdophorus (which might warrant recognition as a full genus, separate from Chaetodon).

== Description ==
Chaetodon auripes has a vividly yellow body, and the dorsal, anal and caudal fins are also yellow. There is a wide vertical black band running through the eyes and a slightly thinner white band immediately behind that. The juveniles have a black ocellus on the upper part of soft-rayed part of the dorsal fin, but this fades as the fish matures. The dorsal fin has 12 spines and 23–24 soft rays while the anal fin has 3 spines and 18–19 soft rays, and the total length that this species can reach is 20 cm (7.9 in).

== Distribution ==
Chaetodon auripes is found in the western Pacific Ocean, from Japan (including the Ryukyu Islands, the Izu Islands and the Ogasawara Islands) and the southwest of South Korea to the southern coasts of China and Vietnam.

== Habitat and biology ==
Chaetodon auripes typically occurs at depths of 1 to 30 m (3.3 to 98.4 ft), and is known to occur as deep as 150 m (490 ft). Adults are usually found on rocky reefs where coral and algae are present, while juveniles are usually found in tidal pools and sheltered rocky areas in shallow water. They gather in aggregations, although they are also often encountered as solitary individuals. This species lives in cooler waters than other butterflyfish, being able to tolerate temperatures down to 10 °C (50 °F) off Japan. It feeds on filamentous algae as well as worms, crustaceans, soft corals, stony corals, sea anemones, and other benthic invertebrates.

== Human interactions ==
This species can be found in the aquarium trade, but is rare.
