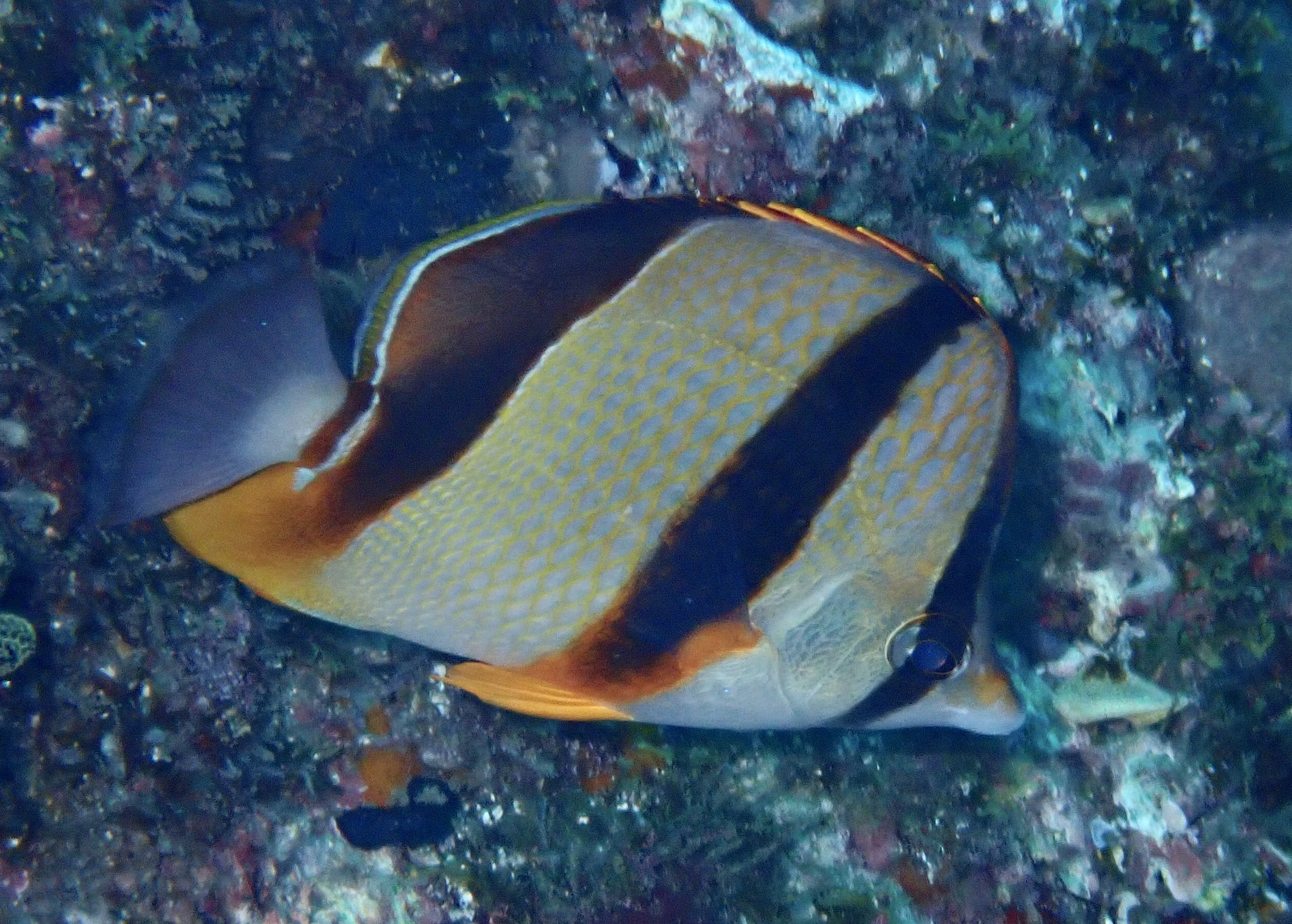

Conservation status
- Least Concern (IUCN 3.1)

Scientific classification
- Kingdom: Animalia
- Phylum: Chordata
- Class: Actinopterygii
- Division: Teleostei
- Order: Acanthuriformes
- Family: Chaetodontidae
- Genus: Chaetodon
- Species: C. robustus

Binomial name
- Chaetodon robustus Günther, 1860

= Three-banded butterflyfish =

Species of fish

The three-banded butterflyfish (Chaetodon robustus) is a species of fish in the family Chaetodontidae.

It inhabits the eastern-central Atlantic Ocean, in warm tropical waters from Mauritania down to Cape Verde and the Gulf of Guinea. It is present in coral reefs, from 30 to 70 meters deep. Its maximum length is 14.5 cm.

== Gallery ==
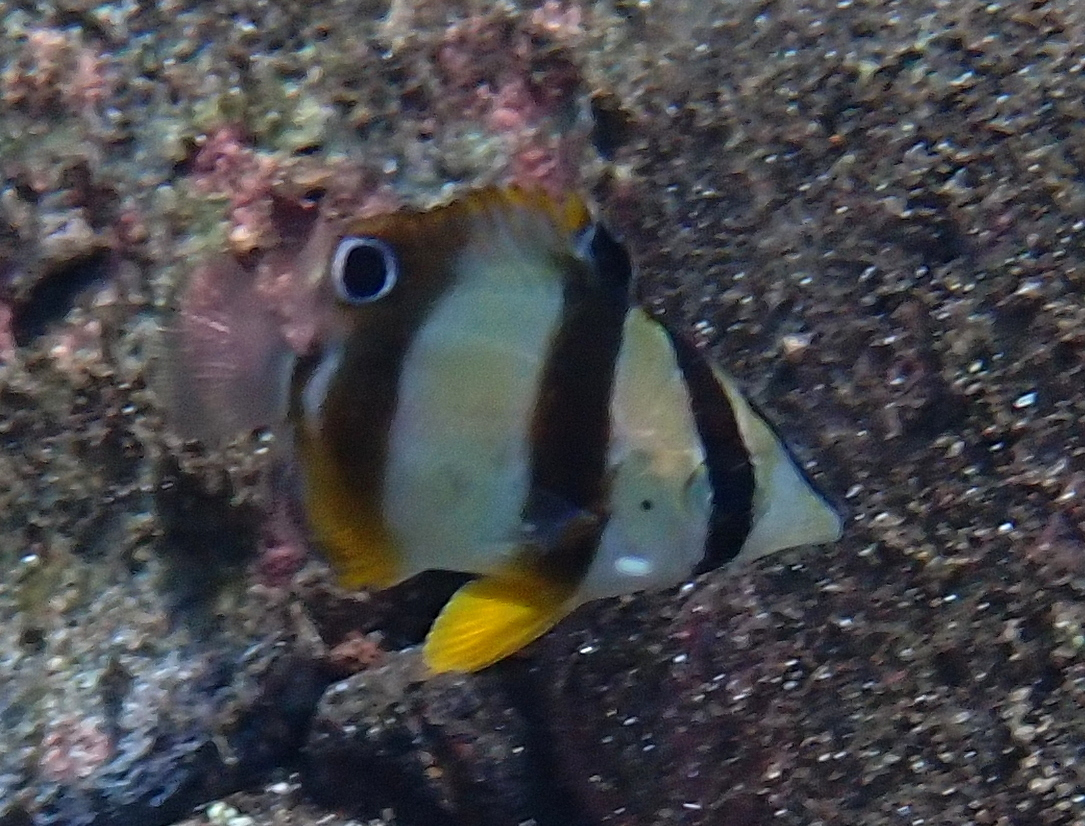
Young juvenile

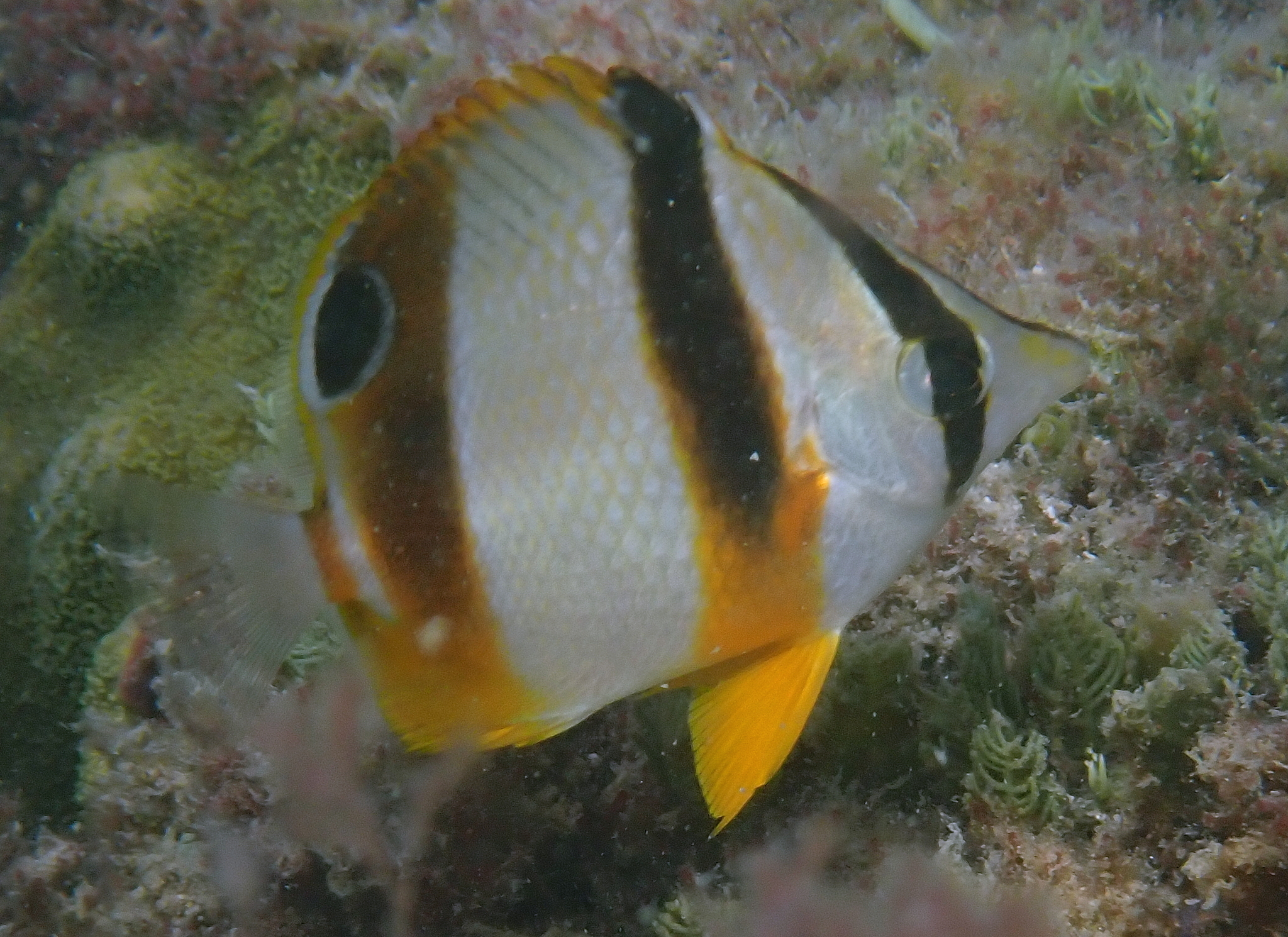
Older juvenile

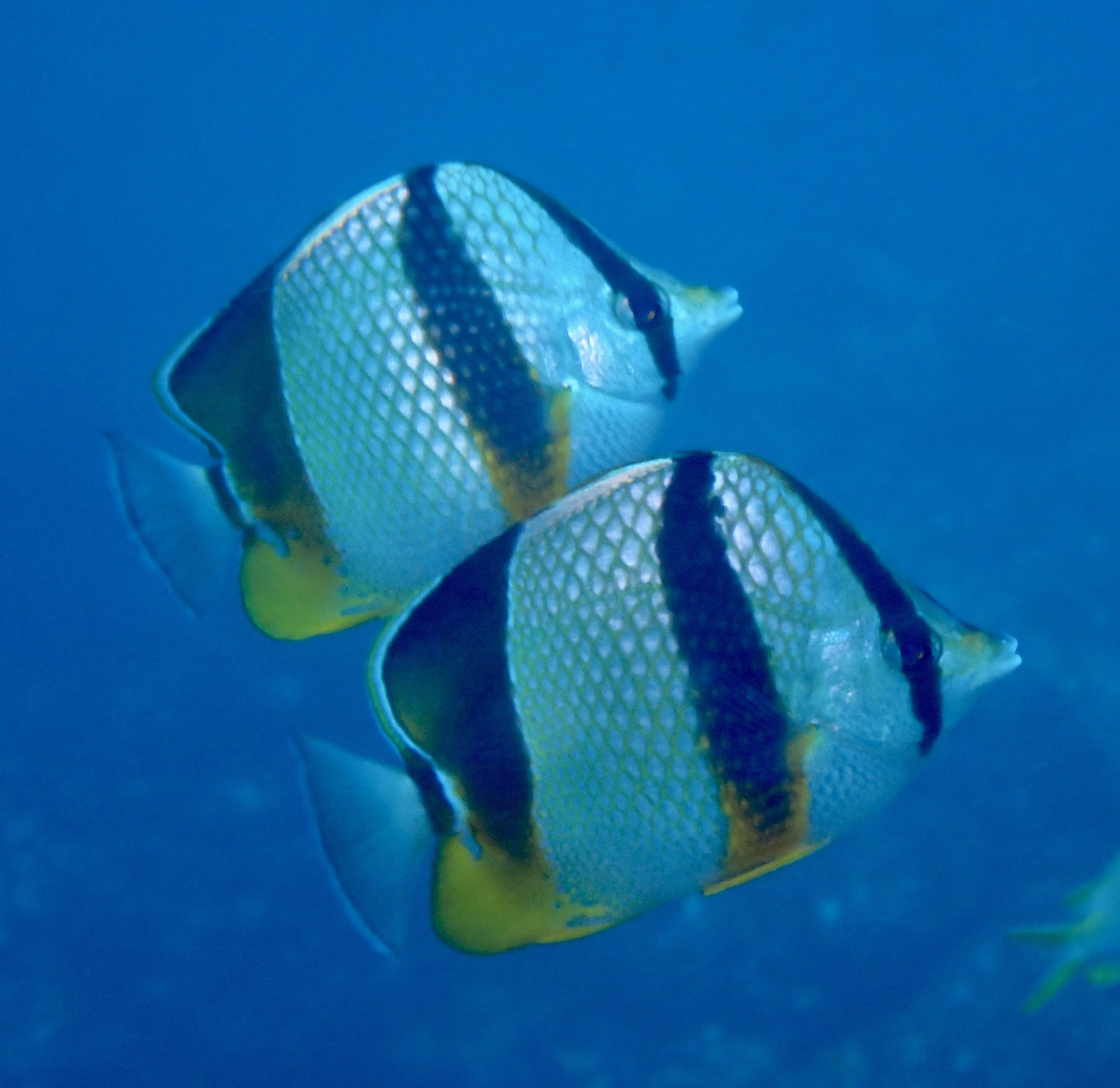
Adults
