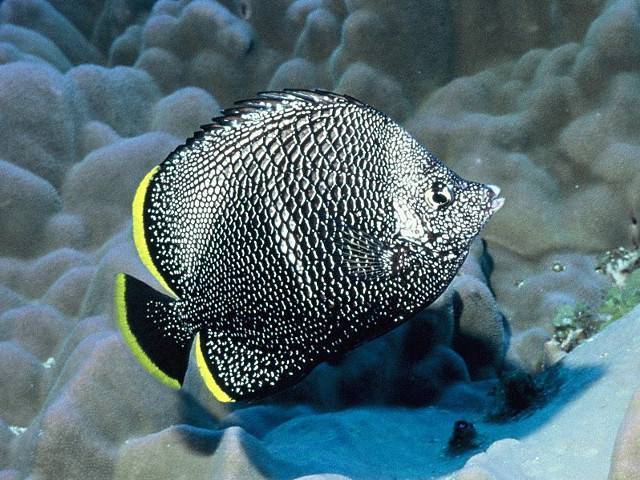

Conservation status
- Least Concern (IUCN 3.1)

Scientific classification
- Kingdom: Animalia
- Phylum: Chordata
- Class: Actinopterygii
- Division: Teleostei
- Order: Acanthuriformes
- Family: Chaetodontidae
- Genus: Chaetodon
- Subgenus: Lepidochaetodon
- Species: C. daedalma

Binomial name
- Chaetodon daedalma D. S. Jordan & Fowler, 1902

= Chaetodon daedalma =

Species of fish

Chaetodon daedalma or the wrought-iron butterflyfish is a species of marine ray-finned fish, a butterflyfish belonging to the family Chaetodontidae. It is native to the western Pacific ocean near central and southern Japan.

== Description ==
Chaetodon daedalma is mainly metallic black in colour with yellow margins to the dorsal, anal and caudal fin. The body has some markings resembling a cross hatch in pattern. The scales, have pale yellow centres and broad black margins forming a lattice or netted pattern. The largely black colouration is very unusual for a species of butterflyfish which are normally much more colourful. This species attains a maximum total length of 15 centimetres (5.9 in).

== Distribution ==
Chaetodon daedalma is endemic to Japan where it is found on the main islands of Japan south of Sagami Bay, as well as the Ryukyu Islands, the Ogasawara Islands, and the Izu Islands.

== Habitat and biology ==
Chaetodon daedalma is found in clear and outer waters at depths which are normally in excess of 10 metres (33 ft) in depth. They are sociable fish and the adults are normally found in schools which number more than 10 individuals. They are also nomadic and the schools will range over a wide area. This is an oviparous species and the males and females form pairs for breeding. They prefer rocky reefs where the graze on algae and benthic invertebrates, including fanworms, hydroids, gastropods, barnacles and tunicates. Sometimes these fish congregate to graze in huge numbers, creating in tight formation which undulates referred to as a "wrought-iron ball". This is thought to be a defensive strategy.

== Taxonomy and etymology ==
Chaetodon daedalma was first formally described in 1902 by the American ichthyologists David Starr Jordan (1851–1931) and Henry Weed Fowler (1878–1965) with the type locality given as Naha, Okinawa Island in the Ryukyu Islands. The specific name daedalma means a style of artistic embroidery and refers to the patterning shown by this species.

== Utlisation ==
Chaetodon daedalma is uncommon in the fish keeping trade outside Japan as it has a rather restricted distribution and it prefers cooler conditions than related species. When it is exported it commands a high price.
