= Indian butterflyfish =

Conservation status
- Least Concern (IUCN 3.1)

Scientific classification
- Kingdom: Animalia
- Phylum: Chordata
- Class: Actinopterygii
- Order: Acanthuriformes
- Family: Chaetodontidae
- Genus: Chaetodon
- Subgenus: Rhombochaetodon
- Species: C. mitratus

Binomial name
- Chaetodon mitratus Günther, 1860

Species of fish

The Indian butterflyfish (Chaetodon mitratus), also known as the headband butterflyfish, is a species of marine ray-finned fish, a butterflyfish from the family Chaetodontidae. It is found in the Indian Ocean.

== Description ==
The Indian butterflyfish has a yellow body which has two broad, black oblique bands which run across the flanks. There is a black eye band which shades to orange below the eye. The pelvic fins, dorsal, anal and caudal fins are yellow. The dorsal fin contains 8 spines and 18–20 soft rays while the anal fin contains 3 spines and 14–15 soft rays. This species attains a maximum standard length of 14 centimetres (5.5 in).

== Distribution ==
The Indian butterflyfish has a scattered distribution across the Indian Ocean and has been recorded from the Cocos (Keeling) Islands and Christmas Island in Australia, the Maldives Islands, Mauritius, Réunion, Amirante Islands and Cosmoledo Island in the Seychelles and the Chagos Archipelago in the British Indian Ocean Territory.

== Habitat and biology ==
The Indian butterflyfish is a species of relatively deep water, living at depths between 22 and 80 metres (72 and 262 ft), commonly at 50 to 68 metres (164 to 223 ft). It has been encountered in small groups of up to 5 individuals on the steep outer drop-offs of reefs, in rubble areas and among areas where black coral and sea fans grow. It is an oviparous species which forms pairs to breed. This species feeds on zooplankton and benthic invertebrates.

== Taxonomy ==
The Indian butterflyfish was first formally described in 1860 by the German-born British zoologist Albert Günther (1830–1914) with the type locality given as Mauritius.

== Utilisation ==
The Indian butterflyfish commands a high price in the aquarium trade because this deep water species is infrequently collected.
