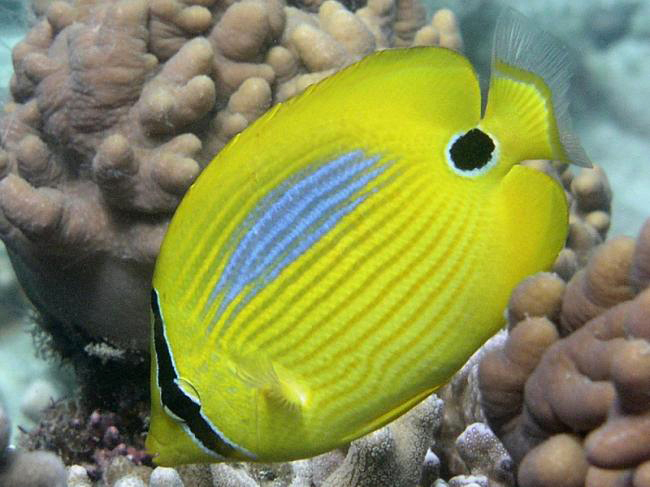

Conservation status
- Least Concern (IUCN 3.1)

Scientific classification
- Kingdom: Animalia
- Phylum: Chordata
- Class: Actinopterygii
- Division: Teleostei
- Order: Acanthuriformes
- Family: Chaetodontidae
- Genus: Chaetodon
- Subgenus: Chaetodon (Tetrachaetodon)
- Species: C. plebeius

Binomial name
- Chaetodon plebeius Cuvier, 1831

Synonyms
- Megaprotodon plebeius (Cuvier, 1831); Chaetodon cordiformis Thiollière, 1857; Megaprotodon maculiceps Ogilby, 1910

= Blueblotch butterflyfish =

Species of fish

The blueblotch butterflyfish (Chaetodon plebeius) is a species of marine ray-finned fish, a butterflyfish belonging to the family Chaetodontidae. It is native to the Indian and Pacific Oceans. It has various names such as bluespot butterflyfish, bluedash butterflyfish or grey-blotched butterflyfish.

== Description ==
It has a bright yellow body which is marked with a large horizontal, elongated blue patch on the flanks above the midline. There is a black spot with bluish white margins on the caudal peduncle and a vertical black band which also has bluish white margins running through the eye. The dorsal, anal, pelvic and caudal fins are brilliant yellow. The juveniles lack the blue patch on the flanks. The dorsal fin contains 13–15 spines and 16–18 soft rays while the anal fin has 4–5 spines and 14–16 soft rays. This species attains a maximum total length of 15 centimetres (5.9 in).

== Distribution ==
The blueblotch butterflyfish is found in the western Pacific Ocean and the eastern Indian Ocean. It ranges from Vietnam east to Fiji, north to southern Japan and south to Australia. It is largely absent from Indonesia except from northern Papua. In Australia this species is found from Rottnest Island in Western Australia north to the Dampier Archipelago, it is then found from the northern Great Barrier Reef south as far as Arrawarra Headland near Coffs Harbour in New South Wales. It can also be found on the Coral Sea reefs, Elizabeth Reef, Middleton Reef and Lord Howe Island in the Tasman Sea.

== Habitat and biology ==
Blueblotch butterflyfishes are found in a range of coral reef habitats, from lagoon shallows to the outer reef slopes. It can be found as lone individuals or as pairs. The adults are obligate corallivores, feeding mostly on the polyps of corals of the genus Pocillopora. The juveniles have been recorded acting as cleaner fish removing ectoparasites from other fish species. The adults have also been known to feed on Acropora corals and a small amount of filamentous green algae. It occurs down to depths of 14 metres (46 ft).

== Systematics ==
Chaetodon plebeius was first formally described in 1831 by the French naturalist Georges Cuvier (1769–1832) with the type locality given as "South Seas". Like the other butterflyfishes which have angular yellow bodies with black eyestripes and a single differently-colored patch, C. plebeius belongs in the subgenus Tetrachaetodon. Among this group it seems to be the most basal living species. If Chaetodon is split up, this subgenus would be placed in Megaprotodon.
