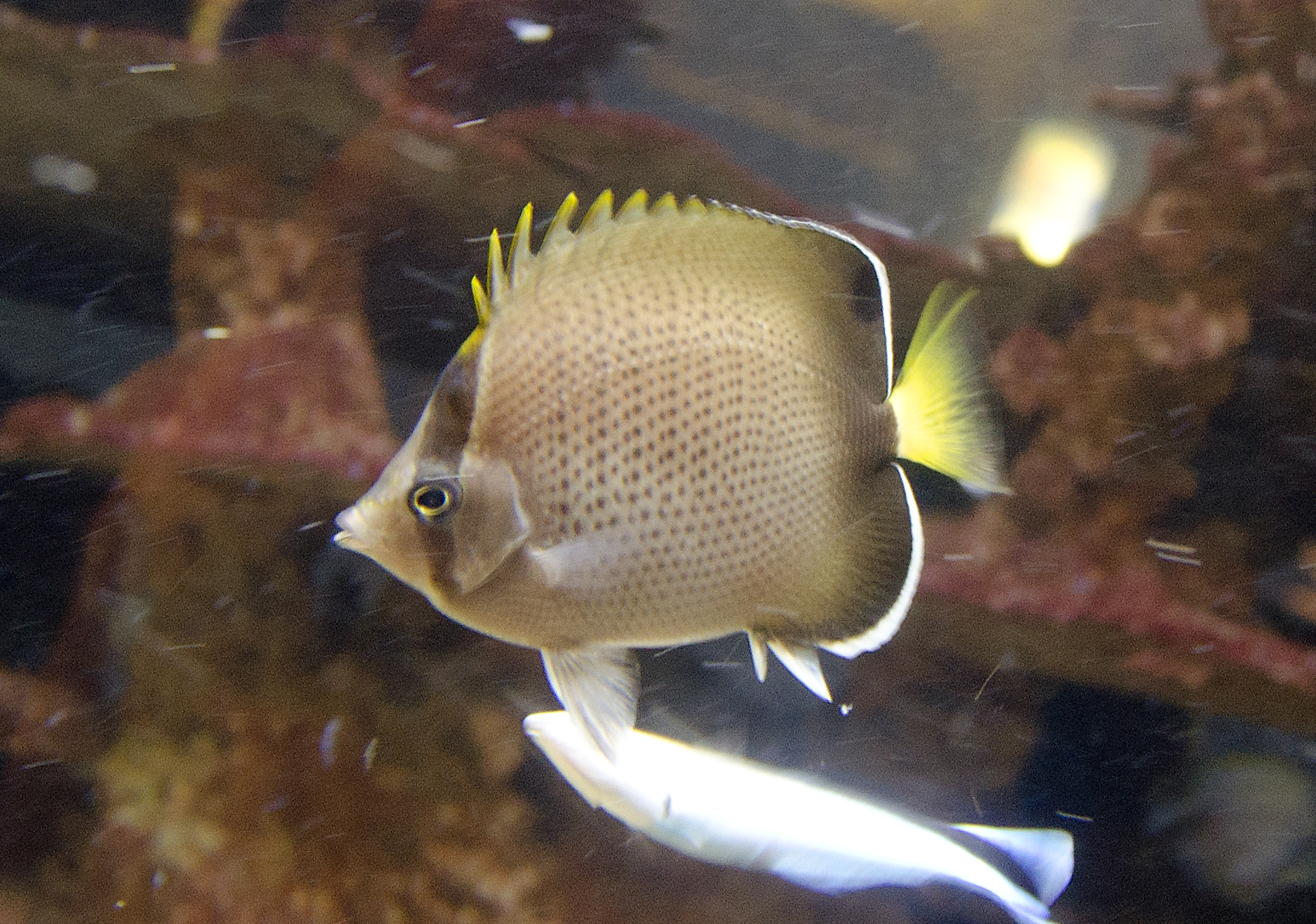

Conservation status
- Least Concern (IUCN 3.1)

Scientific classification
- Kingdom: Animalia
- Phylum: Chordata
- Class: Actinopterygii
- Order: Acanthuriformes
- Family: Chaetodontidae
- Genus: Chaetodon
- Subgenus: Chaetodon (Exornator)
- Species: C. dolosus

Binomial name
- Chaetodon dolosus C. G. E. Ahl, 1923

Synonyms
- Heterochaetodon heterochaetodon dolosus (Ahl, 1923); Chaetodon mendoncae J. L. B. Smith, 1953

= Chaetodon dolosus =

African butterflyfish

Species of fish

Chaetodon dolosus, the African butterflyfish, is a species of marine ray-finned fish, a butterflyfish of the family Chaetodontidae. It is found in the Western Indian Ocean, at depths from 40 to 200 feet (13–66 m.) It can grow up to 15 centimetres (6 in) in length.
