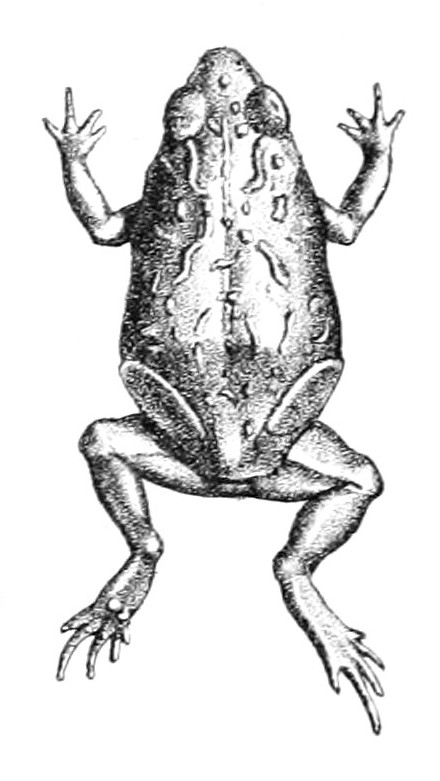

Conservation status
- Least Concern (IUCN 3.1)

Scientific classification
- Kingdom: Animalia
- Phylum: Chordata
- Class: Amphibia
- Order: Anura
- Family: Myobatrachidae
- Genus: Pseudophryne
- Species: P. guentheri

Binomial name
- Pseudophryne guentheri Boulenger, 1882

= Günther's toadlet =

Species of frog endemic to southwestern Australia

Günther's toadlet (GOON-terz TOHD-let) (Pseudophryne guentheri) is a species of frog in the family Myobatrachidae. It is endemic to Australia and is listed as least concern on the IUCN Red List. This is a species of interest for many researchers due to its local Genetic variation, climate adaptation, and reproductive specialization.

== Description and habitat ==
Also sometimes referred to as the crawling toadlet, Günther's toadlet was named after Albert Günther, who named many species of frogs and reptiles throughout Australia. This frog is a small, robust, warty species that can found in Southwestern Australia along the coast in cities like Kalbarri, Western Australia, Esperance, Western Australia, and Perth, as well as more inland regions such as Wheatbelt (Australia), Darling Scarp, and the Great Southern. It is a ground-dwelling species that moves by crawling and can be identified by its unique markings. This species is primarily brown and gray in color and bears a dark bar between its eyes and an "x" above its shoulders. The underside of the species has blotchy black markings against a white background. They appear somewhat flattened in stature, with a small head and short limbs with unwebbed toes. Their hind legs have two large tubercles. They have horizontal pupils and gold irises. Günther's toadlet is one of the smaller species of frog, growing to a maximum length of about 3.5 cm, with females appearing larger than males. It is often confused with the Orange-crowned toadlet (Pseudophryne occidentalis), but can differentiated by its larger tubercles.

Günther's toadlet can be found in a variety of different habitats. They are primarily found in Temperate forests and shrubland, rivers, swamps, marshes, and pastures, and tend to stay moist by burrowing under leaves, fallen trees, and rocks.

== Diet and predation ==
Like most other Pseudophryne species, Günther's toadlet eats mainly small insects like ants, mites, beetles. They do not hunt, but rather sit and wait for their prey to come near to them.

Along with other Australian frogs in the genus Pseudophryne, such as Pseudophryne occidentalis, Pseudophryne semimarmorata, Pseudophryne dendyi, P. bibronii, and Pseudophryne coriacea, P. guentheri is a poisonous species of frog which defends it from many predators. Using Gas chromatography–mass spectrometry(GC-MS) and examination of the frogs' stomach contents, researchers were able to determine that Günther's toadlet had mostly biosynthesized Alkaloid (pseudophrynamines), rather than dietary ones (Pumiliotoxin), which suggests that these frogs are able to maintain a chemical defense even if they are eating very little.

== Life cycle ==
The breeding season for Günther's toadlet begins in autumn and continues through early winter. Males excavate burrows and make vocalizations to attract a mate. A single female can lay up to 100 eggs which are laid and developed within the burrow. The eggs develop up until a specific point in their cycle and then suspend development until heavy enough rain falls to flood the burrows, at which point the tadpoles begin to hatch and make their way to the nearest body of water to feed and continue development. Tadpoles are pear shaped, with long tails compared to their body size and reach a maximum length of 3 cm.

== Adaptations ==
To address the concerns of climate change and habitat fragmentation in Southwestern Australia, one study used genome-wide Single-nucleotide polymorphism (SNP) data to reveal patterns of genetic diversity, Gene flow, and local adaptation in Günther's toadlet. They found that there was strong genetic structure among populations and high Inbreeding coefficients, indicating limited Gene flow and a variation in genetic diversity between populations, with one specific population showing a notable loss of diversity over about 10 years. Additionally, they found that over 500 of the loci analyzed were likely under Directional selection, and of those loci, 413 of them were related to environmental variables like soil moisture, rainfall, and temperature. One specific locus showed a similar gene to one found in Xenopus laevis that involves the activation of egg maturation. Though these genes may be supportive of strong local adaptation, these researchers suggest that due to the species strong population structure and low genetic diversity, some populations may not be equipped to deal with climate change. They further proposed conservation strategies such as targeted or Assisted gene flow in order to increase adaptability and reduce vulnerability in this species.

Günther's Toadlet breeds on land, and the species's unique breeding habits provide important tools for conservation and genetic management. A study done by Aimee J. Silla found that fertilisation rates were highest at moderate osmolarities (25-100 mOsm/kg), a larger range than what is typically found for aquatic-breeding amphibians. This may suggest an adaptation to terrestrial reproduction. The same study also found that high fertilization (>75%) was achieved at relatively low sperm concentrations, and these sperm maintained motility for to 13 days under these conditions. This research may provide insight and guidance supporting conservation and genetic management for P. guentheri and other species with similar mating habits in light of future climate change.

Another study by Rudin-Bitterli et al. (2020) examined intraspecific variation in male reproductive traits across six different populations of Günther's toadlet in Southwest Australia. Researchers measured testes size, sperm quantity, sperm motility, and sperm morphology in relation to the rainfall gradient of the areas in these different populations (because mating is triggered by rainfall). The results showed that males from wetter populations had larger testes, produced more and larger sperm, and had higher sperm motility while the opposite was true for males in drier populations. These results provide supportive evidence that there may be variation in the strength of post-copulatory sexual selection among populations, where wetter environments may support longer breeding periods and different operational sex ratios (OSR), increasing competition in sperm, while drier environments may result in shorter breeding periods with less sperm competition, reducing selection pressure on male reproductive investment. Subsequently, these variations in ejaculate traits amongst populations may contribute to reduced gene flow or Cryptic speciation in the future.
