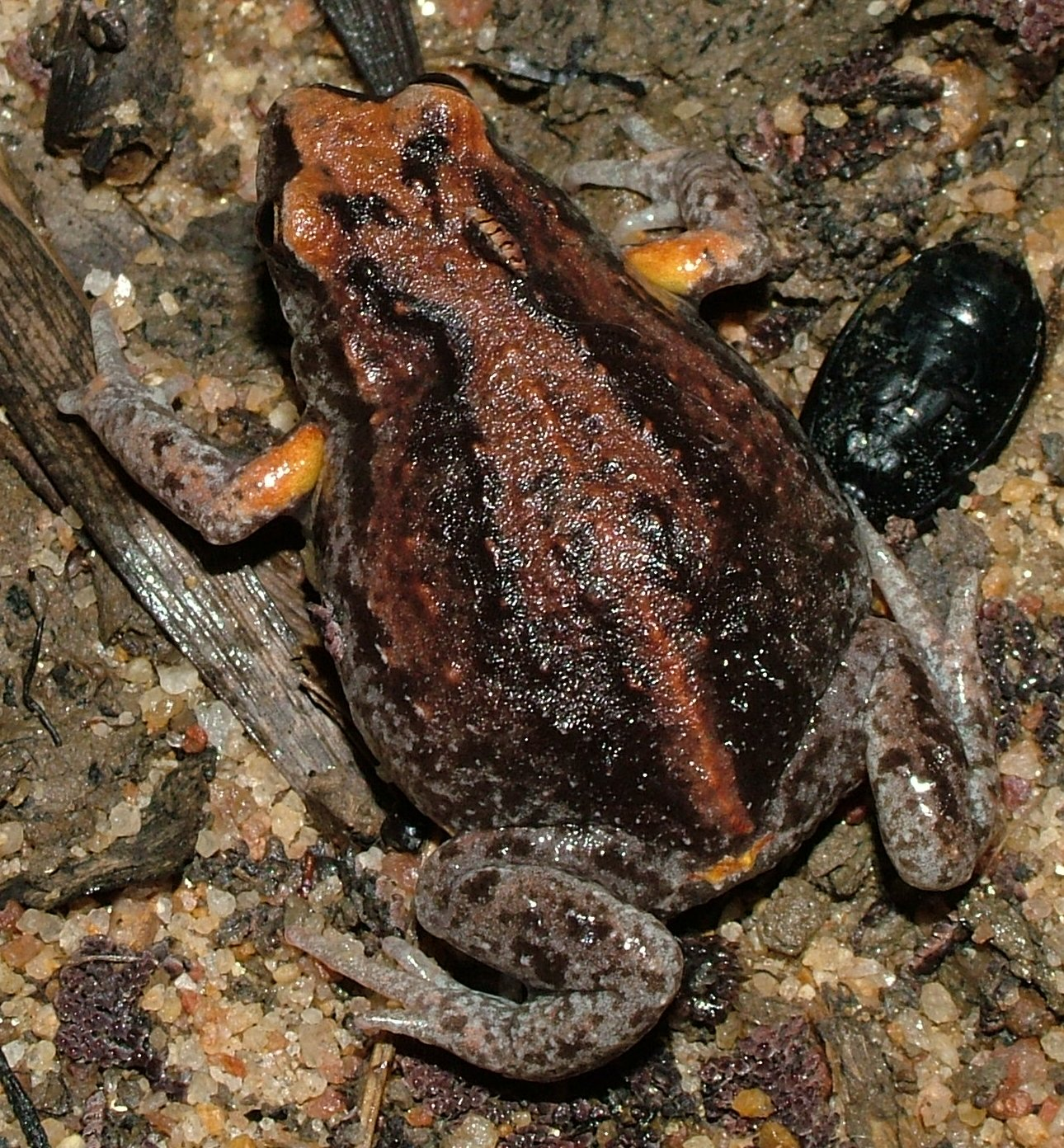

Conservation status
- Least Concern (IUCN 3.1)

Scientific classification
- Kingdom: Animalia
- Phylum: Chordata
- Class: Amphibia
- Order: Anura
- Family: Myobatrachidae
- Genus: Pseudophryne
- Species: P. major

Binomial name
- Pseudophryne major Parker, 1940

= Large toadlet =

Species of amphibian

The large toadlet or great toadlet or major toadlet (Pseudophryne major) is a species of ground-dwelling frog native to eastern Queensland (including Moreton and North Stradbroke Island) and northern New South Wales, Australia.

== Description ==
It is a relatively large species for its genus reaching about 40 mm in length, making it the largest Australian "toadlet". It is normally red-brown on the back with darker marbling and scattered warts and ridges. There is often a red mid-dorsal stripe present. There is a golden yellow patch in the armpits and the side and arms are bluish grey. The ventral surface is dark brown or black with yellowish white marbling. Its snout is relatively sharp.

== Ecology and behaviour ==
This species inhabits in damp areas, creek lines or bogs in dry forest, woodland, sclerophyll forest and heathland. They often live in burrows or damp leaf litter, frequently under rocks or logs. Males make a grating "ark" call after rain from hidden localities, during most of the year. Eggs are laid in moist situations and hatch after heavy rain floods the nest site where tadpoles continue their development in temporary to semi permanent water.

== Similar species ==
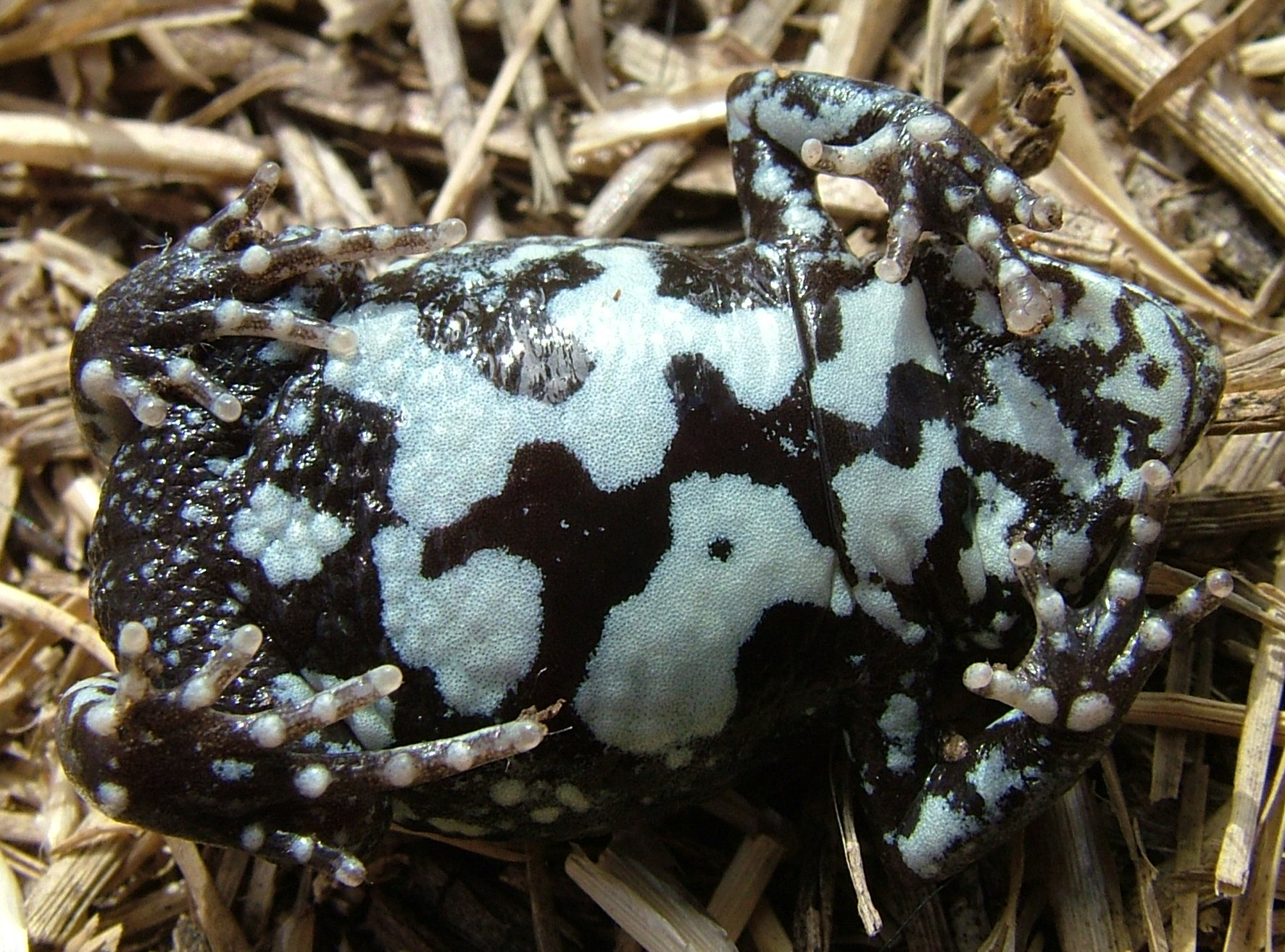
Ventral surface of the large toadlet.

This species is similar to the Bibron's toadlet (Pseudophryne bibronii) from which it can be distinguished by having more red on the back, pointed snout and blue-grey flanks. It is also similar to the magnificent brood frog (Pseudophryne covacevichae) from which it can be distinguished from by distribution. copper-backed brood frog (Pseudophryne raveni) the red-backed toadlet (Pseudophryne coriacea) are also similar to this species, however they can be distinguished by a larger amount of red or copper on the back and a white, not yellow arm patch.
