= Central Ranges toadlet =

Conservation status
- Least Concern (IUCN 3.1)

Scientific classification
- Kingdom: Animalia
- Phylum: Chordata
- Class: Amphibia
- Order: Anura
- Family: Myobatrachidae
- Genus: Pseudophryne
- Species: P. robinsoni

Binomial name
- Pseudophryne robinsoni Donnellan, Mahony & Bertozzi, 2012

Species of Australian frog

The Central Ranges toadlet or Everard Ranges toadlet (Pseudophryne robinsoni) is a species of small frog that is endemic to Australia.

== History ==
The species was first discovered by Mike Tyler in 1970, but was thought at the time to be an isolated eastern population of Pseudophryne occidentalis, and was not formally described until 2012. The specific epithet honours Dr Tony Robinson, formerly of the South Australian Department for the Environment and Natural Resources.

== Description ==
The species grows to 24–27 mm (males) and 25–29 mm (females) in length (SVL). Colouration of the warty upper body is pale brown, khaki or grey, with dark blotches, and with pale orange-brown patches on the upper arms. The belly is smooth and black with white markings. The limbs are short, with unwebbed toes and fingers.

== Distribution and habitat ==
The species occurs in the arid Everard and Musgrave Ranges of extreme north-western South Australia, in Australia's Central Ranges bioregion. There the frogs are found in the vicinity of waterholes and spring-fed pools, sheltering in crevices and beneath rocks and collapsed vegetation.
