= Urotheca decipiens =

Conservation status
- Least Concern (IUCN 3.1)

Scientific classification
- Kingdom: Animalia
- Phylum: Chordata
- Class: Reptilia
- Order: Squamata
- Suborder: Serpentes
- Family: Colubridae
- Genus: Urotheca
- Species: U. decipiens

Binomial name
- Urotheca decipiens (Günther, 1893)

Species of snake

Urotheca decipiens, the pale ground snake, is a species of snake in the family Colubridae. It is found in Honduras, Nicaragua, Costa Rica, Panama, and Colombia.
