= Günther's frog (disambiguation) =

Günther's frog (Hylarana guentheri) is a species of frog in the family Ranidae found in China, Hong Kong, Macau, Taiwan, Vietnam, and possibly Cambodia and Laos.

Günther's frog may also refer to:

- Günther's banded tree frog (Hypsiboas fasciatus), a frog in the family Hylidae found in Bolivia, Brazil, Colombia, Ecuador, French Guiana, Guyana, Peru, Suriname, and possibly Venezuela
- Günther's marsupial frog (Gastrotheca guentheri), a frog in the family Hemiphractidae found in Colombia and Ecuador
- Günther's robber frog (Craugastor omiltemanus), a frog in the family Craugastoridae endemic to Mexico
- Günther's streamlined frog (Nannophrys guentheri), an extinct frog in the family Dicroglossidae that was endemic to Sri Lanka
- Günther's tree frog (Rhacophorus maximus), a frog in the family Rhacophoridae found in China, India, Nepal, Thailand, Vietnam, and possibly Bangladesh
