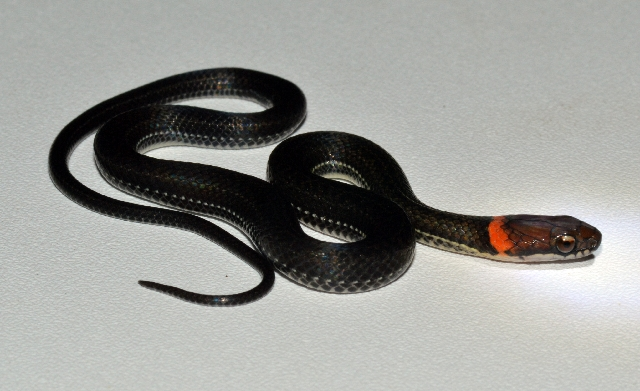
- Urotheca fulviceps

Scientific classification
- Kingdom: Animalia
- Phylum: Chordata
- Class: Reptilia
- Order: Squamata
- Suborder: Serpentes
- Family: Colubridae
- Subfamily: Dipsadinae
- Genus: Urotheca; Bibron, 1843

= Urotheca =

Genus of snakes

Urotheca is a genus of snakes of the family Colubridae. The genus is endemic to the New World.

== Geographic range ==
Species in the genus Urotheca are found in Central America and northwestern South America.

== Species ==
Eight species are recognized as being valid.

- Urotheca decipiens (Günther, 1893) – pale ground snake
- Urotheca dumerilli (Bibron, 1840)
- Urotheca fulviceps (Cope, 1886)
- Urotheca guentheri (Dunn, 1938) – striped glasstail
- Urotheca lateristriga (Berthold, 1859)
- Urotheca multilineata (W. Peters, 1863)
- Urotheca myersi Savage & Lahanas, 1989
- Urotheca pachyura (Cope, 1875)

Nota bene: A binomial authority in parentheses indicates that the species was originally described in a genus other than Urotheca.
