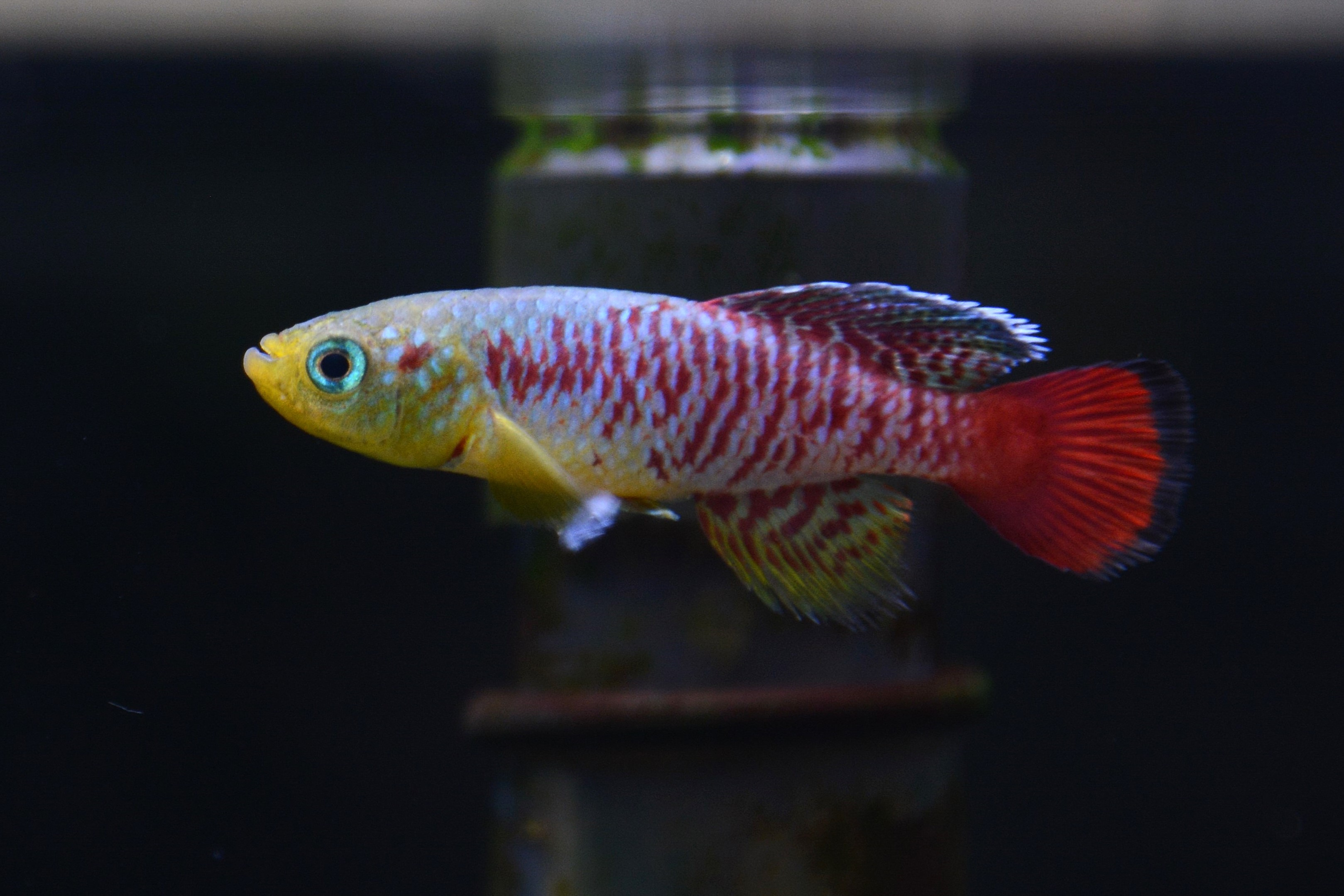

Conservation status
- Endangered (IUCN 3.1)

Scientific classification
- Kingdom: Animalia
- Phylum: Chordata
- Class: Actinopterygii
- Division: Teleostei
- Order: Cyprinodontiformes
- Family: Nothobranchiidae
- Genus: Nothobranchius
- Species: N. guentheri

Binomial name
- Nothobranchius guentheri (Pfeffer, 1893)

Synonyms
- Fundulus guentheri Pfeffer, 1893; Adiniops guentheri (Pfeffer, 1893); Aphyosemion guentheri (Pfeffer, 1893)

= Redtail notho =

Species of fish

The redtail notho (Nothobranchius guentheri) is a species of killifish in the family Nothobranchiidae. It is endemic to Zanzibar. Its natural habitats are intermittent rivers and intermittent freshwater marshes. The redtail notho eats mosquito larvae and other planktonic creatures. Scientists are looking at introducing the species elsewhere in Africa to help with malaria prevention.

As with other "peat spawner" killifish, pairs or small groups spawn by repeatedly pushing into the substrate and releasing and fertilising a single egg. During the dry season when the temporary pools of water the fish inhabit dry up and the adult fish perish, specially adapted proteins in the eggshell or chorion are triggered to retain moisture, thereby ensuring the next generation of fish last until the rains return and the fry can hatch. Once the fry detect a change in pressure (due to being submerged again), and an increase in dissolved carbon dioxide concentration, an enzyme, chorionase is released to soften the eggshell and allow the fish to hatch.

This species is sometimes encountered in the aquarium trade. Eggs have a dry incubation of between 8 and 12 weeks, but most hatch after 9 weeks.

The specific name honours the German-born British ichthyologist and herpetologist Albert Günther (1830–1914), who first noted this species.
