= Urotheca dumerilli =

Conservation status
- Data Deficient (IUCN 3.1)

Scientific classification
- Kingdom: Animalia
- Phylum: Chordata
- Class: Reptilia
- Order: Squamata
- Suborder: Serpentes
- Family: Colubridae
- Genus: Urotheca
- Species: U. dumerilli

Binomial name
- Urotheca dumerilli (Bibron, 1840)

Synonyms
- Calamaria dumerilli Bibron, 1840; Urotheca dumerilli — Garman, 1887; Rhadinaea dumerilli — Maglio, 1970; Urotheca dumerilli — Savage & Crother, 1989

Species of snake

Urotheca dumerilli, also known commonly described as Duméril's graceful brown snake, is a species of snake in the family of Colubridae. The species is endemic to Colombia.

== Etymology ==
The specific name, dumerilli, is in honor of French herpetologist André Marie Constant Duméril.

== Geographic range ==
U. dumerilli is found in western Colombia, in the departments of Antioquia, Cauca, and Chocó.

== Habitat ==
The preferred natural habitat of U. dumerilli is forests.

== Behavior ==
U. dumerilli is terrestrial.

== Diet ==
U. dumerilli preys upon salamanders, small frogs, and small lizards.

== Reproduction ==
U. dumerilli is oviparous.
