= Urotheca guentheri =

Conservation status
- Least Concern (IUCN 3.1)

Scientific classification
- Kingdom: Animalia
- Phylum: Chordata
- Class: Reptilia
- Order: Squamata
- Suborder: Serpentes
- Family: Colubridae
- Genus: Urotheca
- Species: U. guentheri

Binomial name
- Urotheca guentheri (Dunn, 1938)

Synonyms
- Tachymenis decipiens Günther, 1895 (preoccupied); Rhadinaea güntheri Dunn, 1938 (replacement name); Rhadinaea guentheri — J. Peters & Orejas-Miranda, 1970; Urotheca guentheri — Savage & Crother, 1989

Species of snake

Urotheca guentheri, also known commonly as Günther's graceful brown snake and the striped glasstail, is a species of snake in the family Colubridae. The species is native to Central America.

== Etymology ==
The specific name, guentheri, is in honor of German-born British herpetologist Albert Günther.

== Geographic range ==
U. guentheri is found in Costa Rica, Honduras, Nicaragua, and Panama.

== Habitat ==
The preferred natural habitat of U. guentheri is forest, at altitudes of 70–1,800 m (230–5,910 ft).

== Description ==
Dorsally, U. guentheri is dark brown with white lines. Ventrally, it is reddish orange. It may attain a snout-to-vent length (SVL) of 19 in (48 cm).

== Diet ==
U. guentheri preys predominately on frogs.

== Reproduction ==
U. guentheri is oviparous.
