= Urotheca lateristriga =

Conservation status
- Least Concern (IUCN 3.1)

Scientific classification
- Kingdom: Animalia
- Phylum: Chordata
- Class: Reptilia
- Order: Squamata
- Suborder: Serpentes
- Family: Colubridae
- Genus: Urotheca
- Species: U. lateristriga

Binomial name
- Urotheca lateristriga (Berthold, 1859)

Species of snake

Urotheca lateristriga is a species of snake in the family, Colubridae. It is found in Colombia and Ecuador.
