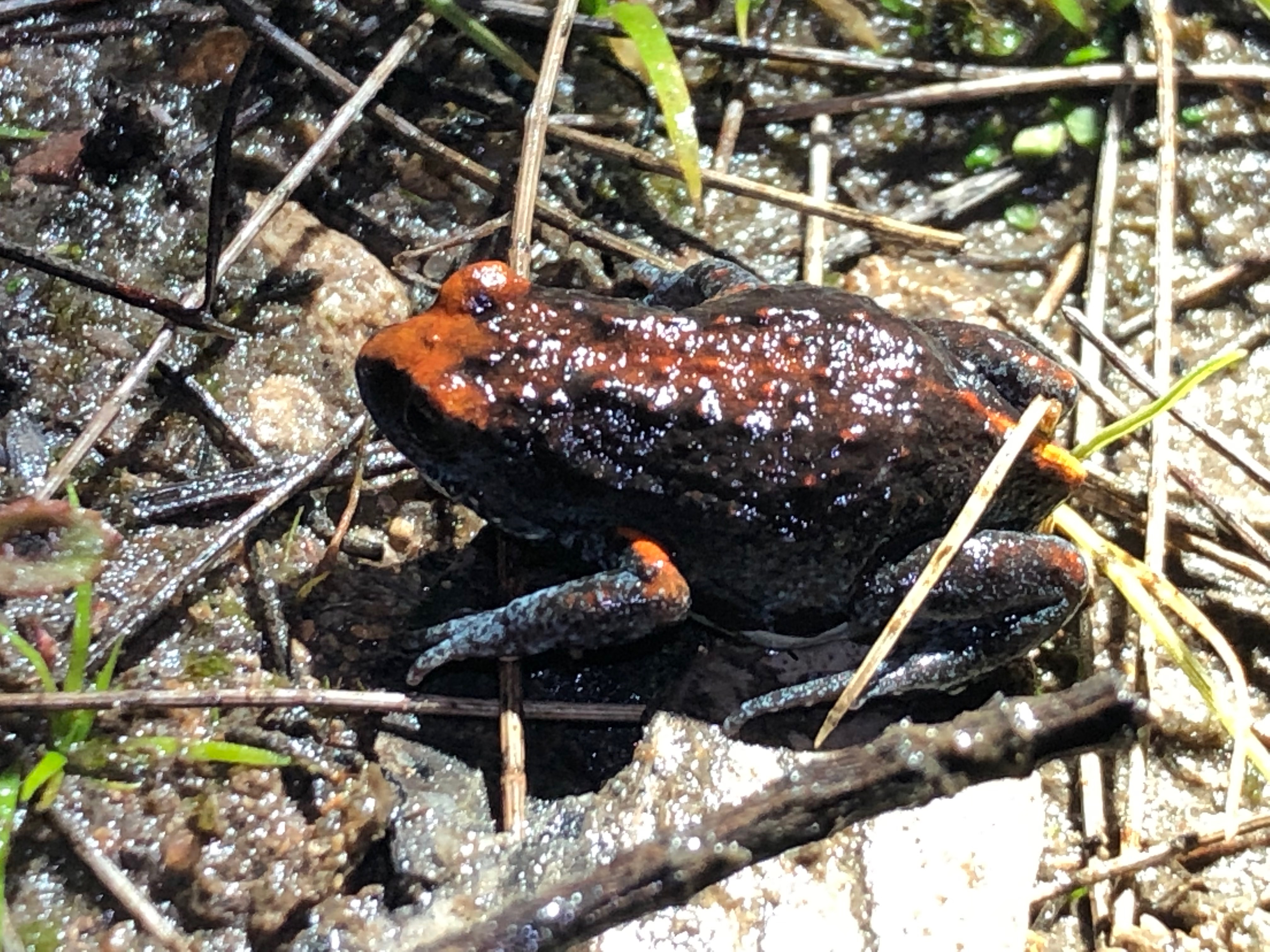

Conservation status
- Endangered (IUCN 3.1)

Scientific classification
- Kingdom: Animalia
- Phylum: Chordata
- Class: Amphibia
- Order: Anura
- Family: Myobatrachidae
- Genus: Pseudophryne
- Species: P. covacevichae

Binomial name
- Pseudophryne covacevichae Ingram and Corben, 1994

= Magnificent brood frog =

Species of amphibian

The magnificent brood frog or magnificent broodfrog (Pseudophryne covacevichae) is a species of frog in the family Myobatrachidae. It is endemic to Queensland, Australia, and is known from near Ravenshoe in the southern Atherton Tableland and from Mount Spec in the Paluma Range. The specific name covacevichae honours Jeanette Covacevich, an Australian herpetologist.

== Taxonomy ==
Prior to its description in 1994, Pseudophryne covacevichae was confused with Pseudophryne major, a more southern species that breeds in winter while P. covacevichae breeds in summer. The finding of P. covacevichae in the Paluma Range in 2013 reduces the geographic separation of these species. Moreover, summer breeding P. major are also known. This suggests that the distinctness of these species needs reassessment.

== Description ==
Pseudophryne covacevichae measure 24–28 mm (0.9–1.1 in) in snout–vent length. The dorsum has bright rufous brown to yellow ground colour. There are diffuse, black paravertebral lines. The cloaca is surrounded by a large yellow patch that continues upwards as a thin, yellow vertebral line. The flanks are black, sometimes suffused with white or grey. The dorsal surface of the upper arm is bright yellow. The venter is marbled in black and white. The upper half of the iris is yellow to gold in adults.

== Habitat and conservation ==
Pseudophryne covacevichae occurs around seepage areas in open eucalypt forests at elevations above 800 m (2,600 ft). Males call from seepage areas at the base of grass tussocks on wet summer and autumn nights, sometimes also during overcast days. The eggs are laid on moist soil in or near seepages. Males typically guard the eggs. After hatching, the tadpoles make their way down the seepage or are washed into first-order streams to continue their development in small pools.

This species is threatened by habitat loss and degradation caused by activities such as grazing, logging, road works, clearing, and development. The discovery of P. covacevichae in the Paluma Range suggests that it is more widespread than previously thought.
