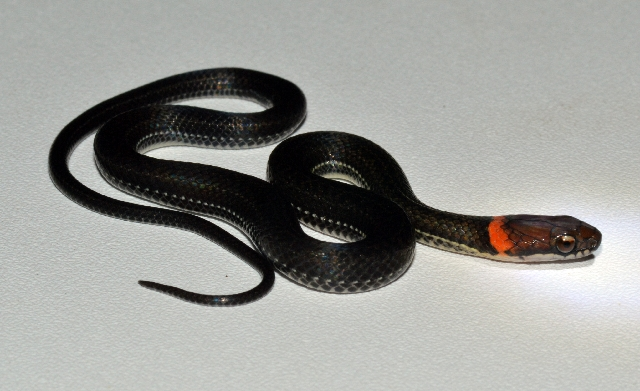

Conservation status
- Least Concern (IUCN 3.1)

Scientific classification
- Kingdom: Animalia
- Phylum: Chordata
- Class: Reptilia
- Order: Squamata
- Suborder: Serpentes
- Family: Colubridae
- Genus: Urotheca
- Species: U. fulviceps

Binomial name
- Urotheca fulviceps (Cope, 1886)

= Urotheca fulviceps =

Species of snake

Urotheca fulviceps is a species of snake in the family, Colubridae. It is found in Costa Rica, Panama, Ecuador, and Colombia.
