= Urotheca myersi =

Conservation status
- Data Deficient (IUCN 3.1)

Scientific classification
- Kingdom: Animalia
- Phylum: Chordata
- Class: Reptilia
- Order: Squamata
- Suborder: Serpentes
- Family: Colubridae
- Genus: Urotheca
- Species: U. myersi

Binomial name
- Urotheca myersi Savage & Lahanas, 1989

Species of snake

Urotheca myersi is a species of snake in the subfamily Dipsadinae of the family Colubridae. The species is endemic to Costa Rica.

== Etymology ==
The specific name, myersi, is in honor of American herpetologist Charles William Myers.

== Habitat ==
The preferred natural habitat of Urotheca myersi is forest, at altitudes of 1,500–2,255 m (4,921–7,398 ft).

== Description ==
Dorsally, Urotheca myersi is uniformly dark brown, except for the head which is lighter brown. Ventrally, it is bright canary yellow.

== Behavior ==
Urotheca myersi is terrestrial.

== Diet ==
Urotheca myersi preys upon salamanders and frogs.

== Reproduction ==
Urotheca myersi is oviparous.
