= Urotheca multilineata =

Conservation status
- Least Concern (IUCN 3.1)

Scientific classification
- Kingdom: Animalia
- Phylum: Chordata
- Class: Reptilia
- Order: Squamata
- Suborder: Serpentes
- Family: Colubridae
- Genus: Urotheca
- Species: U. multilineata

Binomial name
- Urotheca multilineata (Peters, 1863)

Species of snake

Urotheca multilineata is a species of snake in the family, Colubridae. It is found in Colombia and Venezuela.
