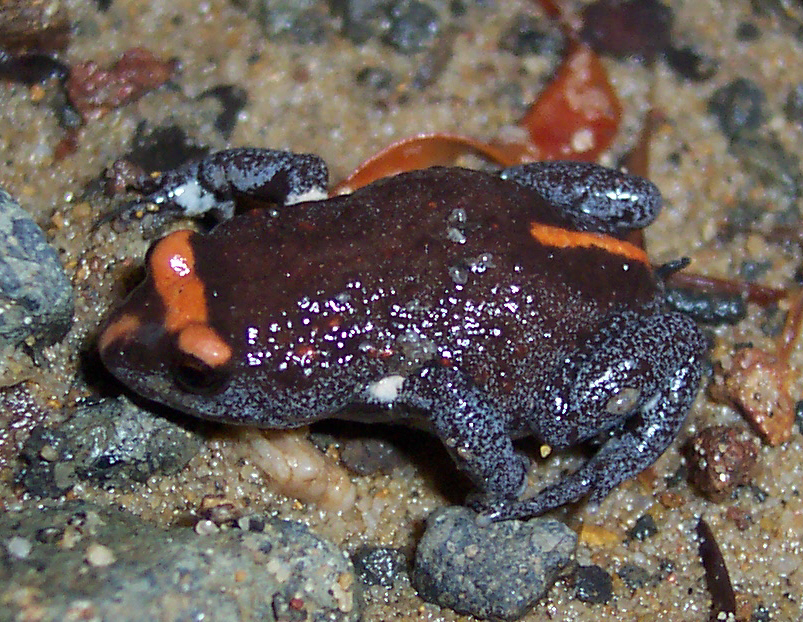
- The Red-crowned Toadlet (Pseudophryne australis)

Scientific classification
- Domain: Eukaryota
- Kingdom: Animalia
- Phylum: Chordata
- Class: Amphibia
- Order: Anura
- Family: Myobatrachidae
- Subfamily: Myobatrachinae
- Genus: Pseudophryne; Fitzinger, 1843

Species
- See text
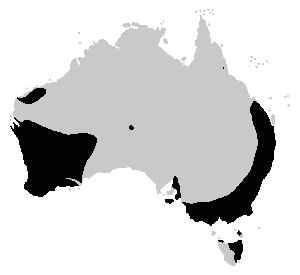
- The distribution of Pseudophryne (in black).

= Pseudophryne =

Genus of amphibians

Pseudophryne is a genus of small myobatrachid frogs. All of these frogs are small terrestrial frogs, and as such, most species are commonly called toadlets (pseudo- meaning deceptive, phryne meaning toad).

== Distribution, habitation and reproduction ==
The genus comprises thirteen species, ten from eastern Australia, and three from Western Australia. Species within the genus Pseudophryne lay their eggs on moist ground. The tadpoles develop within the eggs, and once they reach hatching size, will become dormant. Once sufficient rain occurs to flush the eggs into a creek or river, the eggs will hatch and release tadpoles into the water. Many of the species within this genus have the ability to form hybrids.

== Species ==
The following species are recognised in the genus Pseudophryne:

Common name	Binomial name
Red-crowned toadlet	Pseudophryne australis Gray, 1835
Bibron's toadlet	Pseudophryne bibronii Günther, 1859
Red-backed toadlet	Pseudophryne coriacea Keferstein, 1868
Southern corroboree frog	Pseudophryne corroborree Moore, 1953
Magnificent brood frog	Pseudophryne covacevichae, Ingram and Corben, 1994
Dendy's toadlet	Pseudophryne dendyi Lucas, 1892
Douglas' toadlet	Pseudophryne douglasi Main, 1964
Günther's toadlet	Pseudophryne guentheri Boulenger, 1882
Large toadlet	Pseudophryne major Parker, 1940
Orange-crowned toadlet	Pseudophryne occidentalis Parker, 1940
Northern corroboree frog	Pseudophryne pengilleyi Wells and Wellington, 1985
Copper-backed brood frog	Pseudophryne raveni Ingram and Corben, 1994
Central Ranges toadlet	Pseudophryne robinsoni Donnellan, Mahony, and Bertozzi, 2012
Southern toadlet	Pseudophryne semimarmorata Lucas, 1892
