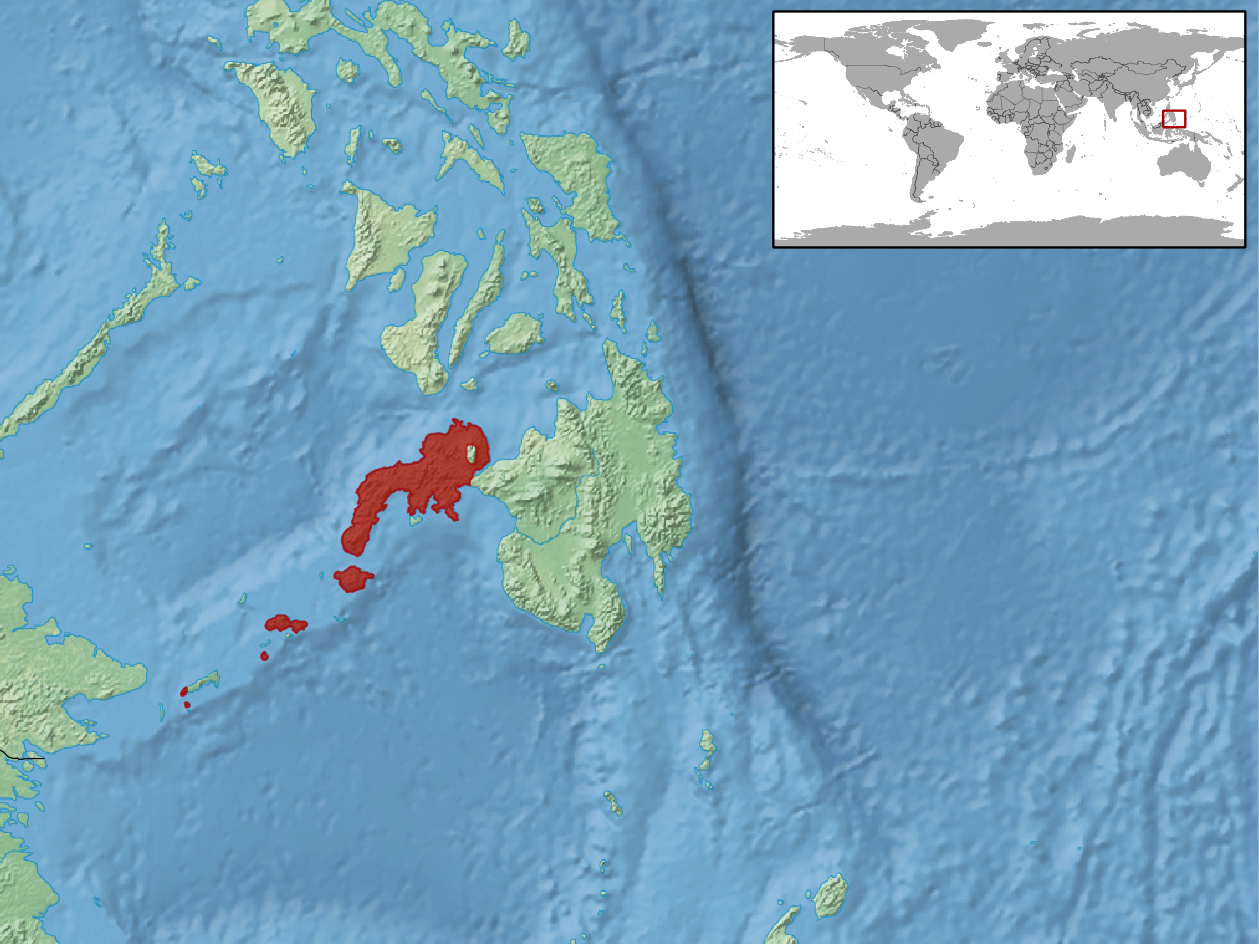
- Geographic range of Draco guentheri

Conservation status
- Least Concern (IUCN 3.1)

Scientific classification
- Kingdom: Animalia
- Phylum: Chordata
- Class: Reptilia
- Order: Squamata
- Suborder: Iguania
- Family: Agamidae
- Genus: Draco
- Species: D. guentheri

Binomial name
- Draco guentheri Boulenger, 1885

Synonyms
- Draco guentheri Boulenger, 1885; Draco dapitani Rizal, 1893; Draco rizali Wandolleck, 1900; Draco volans reticulatus — Hennig, 1936 (part); Draco reticulatus — Gaulke, 1993; Draco guentheri — McGuire & Alcala, 2000

= Draco guentheri =

Species of lizard

Draco guentheri, commonly known as Günther's flying lizard is a species of "flying dragon" in the family Agamidae. The species is endemic to the Philippines.

== Geographic range ==
In the Philippines D. guentheri is found on the islands of Basilan, Bongao, Jolo, Mindanao, Sanga-Sanga, Siasi, and Simunul.

== Habitat ==
The preferred natural habitat of D. guentheri is forest, at altitudes from sea level to 1,500 m (4,900 ft).

== Reproduction ==
D. guentheri is oviparous.

== Etymology ==
The specific name, guentheri, is in honor of German-British zoologist Albert Günther.

== Taxonomy ==
This species was originally described in 1885 by the Belgian-British zoologist George Albert Boulenger, who named it Draco guentheri.

This species is also notable for having been collected by the Philippine national hero Jose Rizal during his exile in Dapitan, Mindanao in 1893. Rizal identified it as a new species of lizard which he tentatively named, Draco dapitani. Rizal sent specimens to Europe, to the German zoologist Benno Wandolleck. In 1900 Wandolleck, thinking Rizal's specimens represented a new species, described it and named it Draco rizali, thereby creating another synonym. Rizal's specimens, subsequently, were destroyed during the bombing of Dresden in World War II.

In 1936 German zoologist Willi Hennig considered this lizard to be part of what he called a subspecies, Draco volans reticulatus. In 1993 German herpetologist Maren Gaulke raised it to full species status as Draco reticulatus. And most recently, in 2000, American herpetologist Jimmy McGuire and Filipino herpetologist Angel Alcala once again recognized Boulenger's original Draco guentheri as a valid species.
