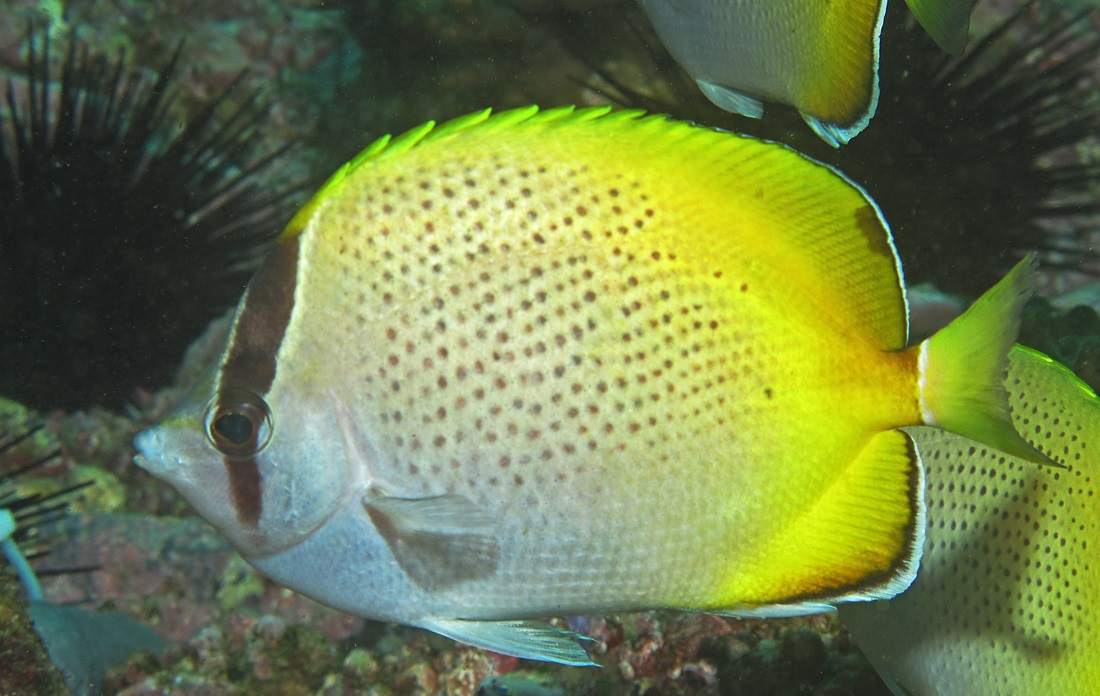

Conservation status
- Least Concern (IUCN 3.1)

Scientific classification
- Kingdom: Animalia
- Phylum: Chordata
- Class: Actinopterygii
- Order: Acanthuriformes
- Family: Chaetodontidae
- Genus: Chaetodon
- Subgenus: Chaetodon (Exornator)
- Species: C. guentheri

Binomial name
- Chaetodon guentheri C. G. E. Ahl, 1923

Synonyms
- Chaetodon punctulatus Ahl, 1923

= Chaetodon guentheri =

Species of fish

Chaetodon guentheri, Günther's butterflyfish or the crochet butterflyfish, is a species of marine ray-finned fish, a butterflyfish belonging to the family Chaetodontidae. It is native to The western Pacific Ocean.

== Description ==
Chaetodon guentheri has a body which is mainly white to pale yellow in colour and marked with small dark spots which create a pattern of irregular lines. The posterior part of the body, the soft-rayed part of the dorsal fin and the anal fin are yellow. A vertical black bar runs through the eye. The background colour to the body is whitest towards the head and becomes yellow towards the back and tail. The dorsal and anal fins also have a white band on the margin with a thin black band to the inside of that. The dorsal fin has 13 spines and 21-22 soft rays, while the anal fin contains 3 spines and 18 soft rays. This species attains a maximum total length of 18 centimetres (7.1 in).

== Distribution ==
Chaetodon guentheri is a species of the Western Pacific Ocean and it is found from southern Japan and Taiwan on the north south as far as New South Wales. It also occurs off Lord Howe Island, the Great Barrier Reef east to Tonga.

== Habitat and biology ==
Chaetodon guentheri is found on seaward reefs where there is a dense coral growth, at water depths from 5 to 50 metres (16 to 164 ft). They are normally solitary but will form schools, especially when making longer movements typically where there are strong currents. They are mostly found in areas of sponge growth and they prefer deeper waters where sponges grow in the tropics and can be found at shallower depths in temperate areas. Gunther's butterflyfish will move through open water and it is known to clean large pelagic fishes. It is an oviparous species in which the males and females form pairs to breed. They feed on plankton. They also feed on soft and stony coral polyps, sea anemones, sponges, worms, tunicates, crustaceans and other benthic invertebrates

== Taxonomy and etymology ==
Chaetodon guentheri was first formally described in 1923 by the German zoologist Christoph Gustav Ernst Ahl (1898-1945) with the type locality given as Manado on Sulawesi in Indonesia. The specific name honours the German-born British zoologist, ichthyologist, and herpetologist Albert Günther (1830-1914) who first described this species as C. miliaris in 1871.

== Utilisation ==
Chaetodon guentheri is rarely collected for the aquarium trade.
