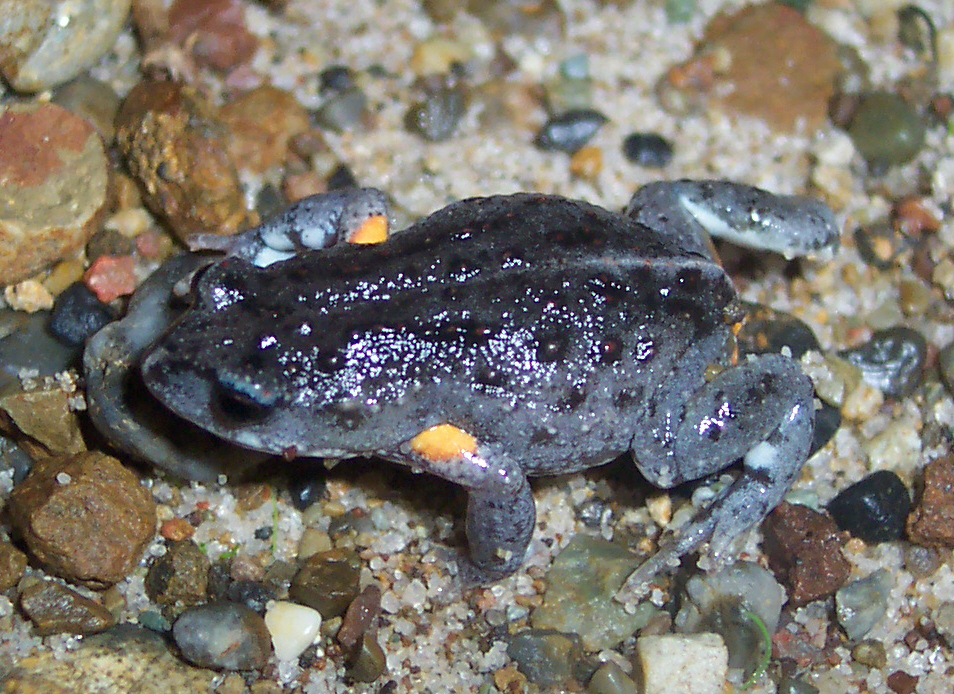

Conservation status
- Least Concern (IUCN 3.1)

Scientific classification
- Kingdom: Animalia
- Phylum: Chordata
- Class: Amphibia
- Order: Anura
- Family: Myobatrachidae
- Genus: Pseudophryne
- Species: P. bibronii

Binomial name
- Pseudophryne bibronii Günther, 1859
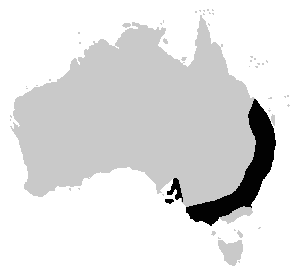
- Range of the Bibron's toadlet

= Bibron's toadlet =

Species of amphibian

Bibron's toadlet or brown toadlet (Pseudophryne bibronii) is a species of Australian ground-dwelling frog that, although having declined over much of its range, is widespread through most of New South Wales, Victoria, south-eastern Queensland, and eastern South Australia, including Kangaroo Island. Bibron's toadlet settles in a wide variety of habitats within these region but they mainly reside in dry forests, woodland, shrubland, grassland, coastal swamps, heathland, and sub-alpine areas. They deposit their eggs in leaf litters during the flooding season, which is essential for the proper development of the egg. This species has high sexual dimorphism within the species and utilizes chemosignals to attract potential mates.

== Taxonomy ==
The genus Pseudophryne encapsulates 14 different species of frogs localized to Australia. These frogs are morphologically similar to small bufonid frogs not localized to Australia. The first known nomenclature of the Pseudophryne genus dates back to 1835 with the characterization of the Bombinator australis. The types and localities of different Pseudophryne species has been debated, P. bibronni being localized to South Eastern Australia and other Pseudophryne localized to different regions in Australia.

== Description ==
This species is variable and may represent more than one species. It grows to about 30mm in length and is brown, grey, or black above, often with scattered red spots. It is normally strongly marbled black and white on the ventral surface, however in some areas this marbling can be faint. There is always an orange, red or yellow patch in the armpits. This patch varies from yellow to orange between sites. At the Jervis Bay region this patch is always yellow, this may be a result of hybridization with the Dendy's toadlet (Pseudophryne dendyi) which has a strong yellow patch in the armpits. There is also a yellow/orange patch or raised bump on the back of the thigh. Its fingers and toes do not show any webbing nor do they contain any discs. The species has horizontal pupils and the iris displays a gold coloring.

The species shows high sexual dimorphism in terms of size. Females are 14% longer than male toadlets and 15% heavier than male toadlets. This is due to the hypothesized longer growing period of female members of the species compared to male members of the species. The cause of female longevity is unknown but it is speculated that it is due to decreased predation risk and increased lifetime expectancy.

== Diet and predation ==
The diet of this species is very similar to the diet of another Australian toadlet, Pseudophryne coriacea. They primarily feed on small invertebrates present in leaf litter, such as small ants and greenflys. However, there seems to be no selection in the type of prey that this species will consume. They will consume any arthropod that becomes available to them in the leaf litter present in their habitat. Small black ants are the most common source of food for this species. This species also produces pumiliotoxins (PTXs) that deter predators through their diet. While the mechanism of this acquisition is unknown, consumption of certain alkaloids in their diet allows the toadlet to produce PTXs that deter predators like snakes. These toxins are similar to the compounds secreted by the Poison Dart frogs from South America.

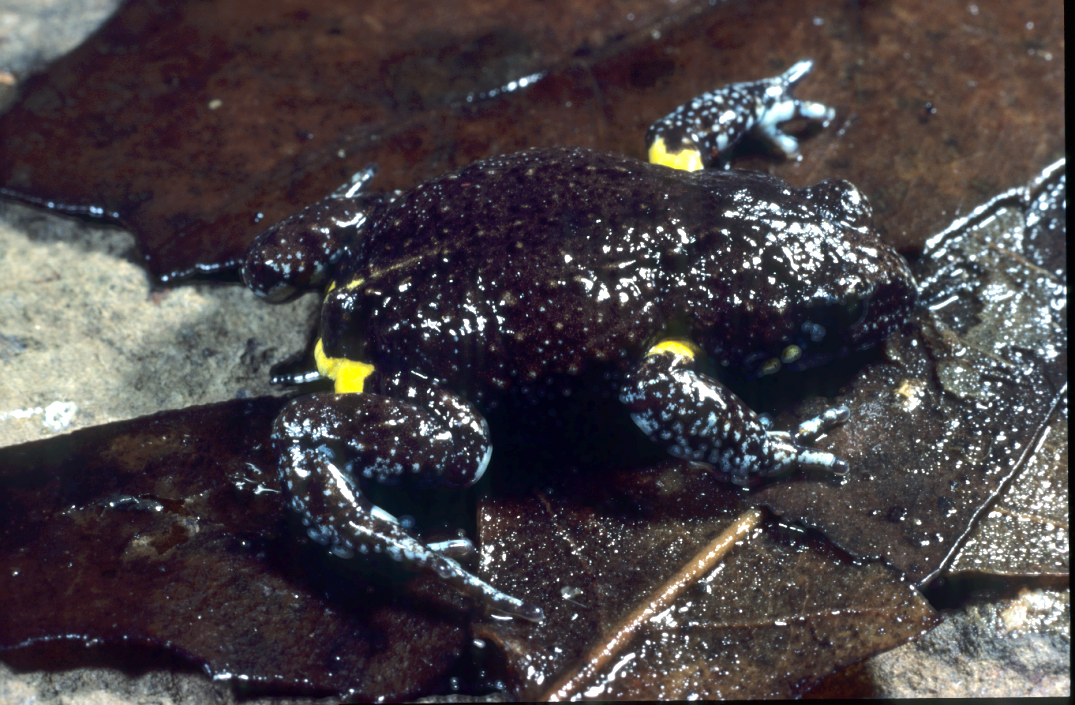
Image of Bibron's toadlet with coloration and markings

Because of the toxic nature of PTXs, snake species avoid feeding on these frogs. The only real known predator of the P. Bibronii is Limnodynastes peronii, also known as the two striped grass frog. Bones of the Bibron's toadlet have been found in the gut content of two striped grass frogs in the Wallingat State Forest in New South Wales, Australia.

== Behaviour ==
This species inhabits areas that are likely to be flooded after rain. This can be anything from coastal swamps, creeks, temporary ponds/roadside ditches in forest, cleared land, heathland and even sub-alpine areas. When threatened, the Bibron's toadlet will often lie on its back, unresponsive, pretending to be dead. This performance had been reported to last for up to an hour.

=== Reproduction ===
The males attract the females by making a grating "cre-eek" noise from a concealed area, in mud, under rocks, or within damp leaf litter. Breeding season begins after the heavy rains during the Australian autumn months of March, April, and May, and proceeds for four to five months after. Most breeding and mating occurs at night and can occur at cold temperatures.

The species is polyandrous, with each female mating with several males. The female visits up to eight males, mates with each, and deposits eggs in the shallow nest he has dug. As the female releases the eggs in the nest, the male grabs the female by the inguinal amplexus and fertilizes the eggs as they are being released by the female. The female moves on and the male tends to the nest. The nest, which may contain moist leaf litter or sphagnum moss, floods during rain. The eggs hatch and the tadpoles develop in the water. If no sufficient rain happens soon after laying the eggs can remain unhatched for many weeks, with the tadpoles developing inside. The nest must stay wet so the eggs remain moist, but not too wet or they will be washed away. Female frogs that mate with more males, thus depositing eggs in more nest sites, are more likely to have some young survive.

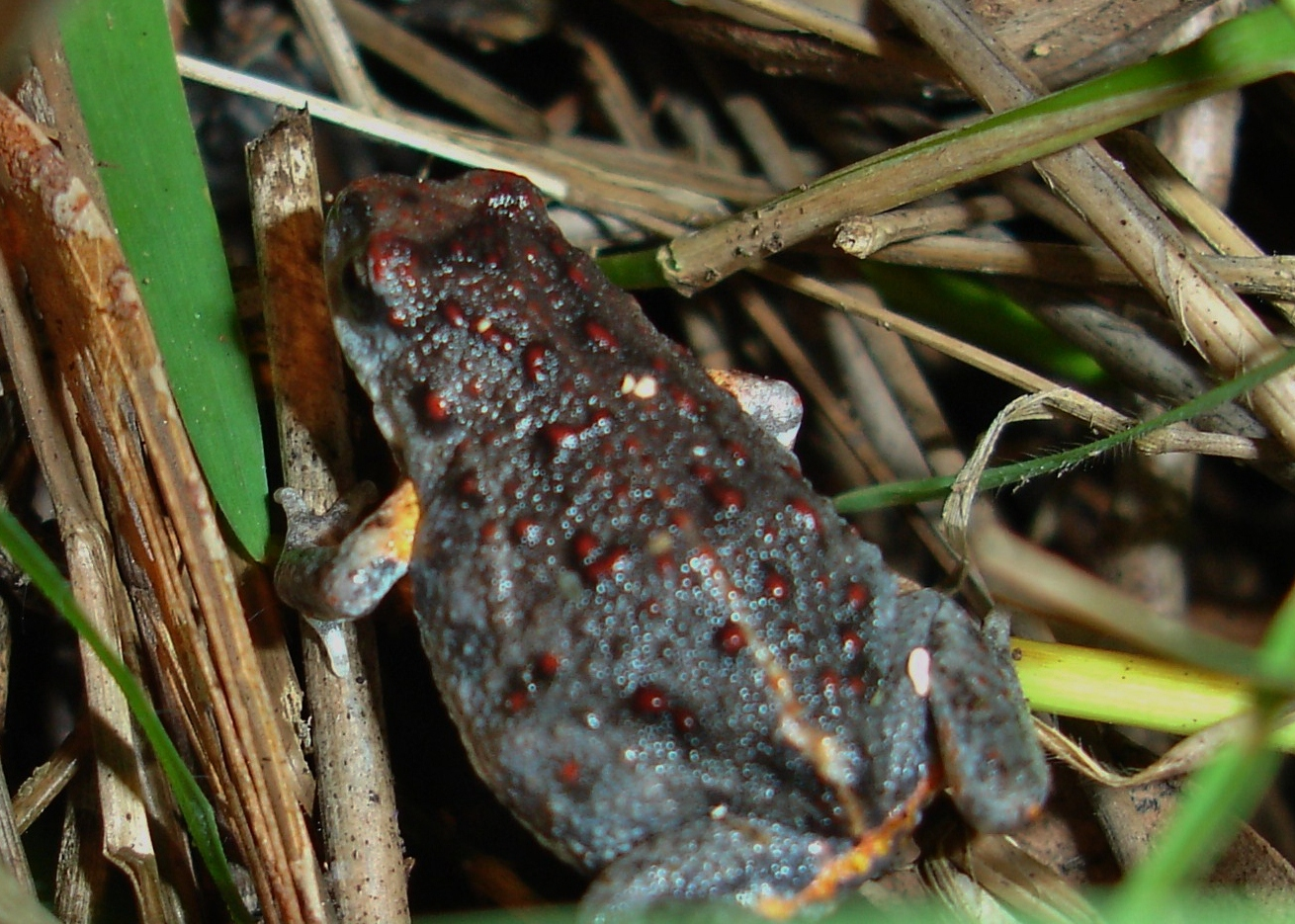
Image of the Bibron's Toadlet in leaf litter

=== Calling behavior ===
This species attracts mates and establishes its territory by displaying certain calls during the breeding season. This calling behaviour uses acoustic signals that are modulated by the presence of other males and females in the area. There are two characteristic calls of this species. The first one is the "advertisement call" which is marked by a short two part sequence that sounds at a higher relative frequency. The second call is the "territorial call" which is distinguished by its longer one part call that sounds at a lower overall frequency.

The frequency of these calls is greatly affected by the presence of other members of the species in the area. In response to increased presence of males the call rate increased by twofold, and in response to the increased presence of females the call rate increased by threefold. Additionally, this species increases the frequency of territorial calls in the presence of males and increases advertisement calls in the presence of females. Thus, each of these calls has a specific effect on female choice and male competition that determines the overall mating success of each individual. Males only reach the maximum level of advertising calls in the presence of females. If there are only males present, the males will choose to wait until there is a possibility they could mate. Also, females have a bias towards males with more complex calls produced at a higher rate. It has been thought that better calling patterns are an indication of the quality of the nest site which may be why they are so important in mating success. Overall, it is evident that calling behaviour is significantly affected by competition amongst males and the possibility of mating with females, and calling behaviour clearly affects females in their decisions to mate and reproduce.

=== Chemosignals ===
For this species, calling behaviour during mating season can have significant costs for the survival of the frog. Time spent calling decreases time spent foraging, drinking water, and hiding from prey. Increased calling time increases the risk of dehydration and starvation. To mitigate these costs, this species utilizes chemosignals to attract females and repel males from their territory. The anatomy of this species includes pronounced dorsal, axillary, and femoral glands that have been shown to produce a pungent mucus that activates during the breeding season.

The chemosignals expunged by the members of this species serve as both a mate attractant and as a repellent to other males. Female P. bibronii have been proven to be attracted to male odors and males have been proven to avoid other male odors. Interestingly, females are also attracted to other female odors which could allow them to locate nest sites that have been previously visited by other females. Male P. bibronii increase calling behaviour in the presence of female odors. Chemosignals are an important way that this species deduces the sex of other members of the species in cryptic conditions with low visual and auditory information.

The combination of both acoustic and chemical communication can also be seen in two other frogs, the Australian magnificent treefrog and the dwarf African clawed frog. Similar to P. bibronii, the African clawed frog also mates in dark and murky conditions, indicating that chemical communication evolved to help frogs distinguish potential mates with lower levels of other sensory information. Many members of the anuran family that breed through acoustic signaling also have structurally similar breeding glands that are now vestigial. This suggests that chemical signaling in P. bibronii and other anurans evolved prior to acoustic signaling.

== Egg development and regulation ==
The eggs of P. bibronii are heavily regulated by the water content and partial pressure of oxygen in the atmosphere. After being fertilized, the eggs respond to changes in the environment to modulate growth. The terrestrial growth period of the eggs lasts about four to five months and after heavy flooding the eggs hatch into tadpoles. If no flooding occurs the eggs can regulate growth for up to three months before they have a lower chance of survival. During this terrestrial period, the frog is subject to many different hydrous and anhydrous conditions that have different effects on growth. P. bibronii develop faster in relatively wet conditions at higher water potentials. P. bibronii eggs have a lower tolerance range compared to other flexible shelled reptiles that are also sensitive to water conditions. Thus, P. bibronii males make nesting sites in areas that are moist and are likely to flood to initiate hatching.

P. bibronii eggs hatch in response to partial pressure of oxygen in the surroundings. Eggs develop in burrows that are buried under vegetation or leaf litters. The atmospheric oxygen reaches the eggs through small tunnels and oxygen pressure remains stable until eggs are mature. Eggs reach maturation after 39 days of age and if they are flooded at this point they will be ready to hatch. Once the nest is flooded with water the partial pressure of oxygen in the nest decreases as the oxygen consumption of the embryos increases. The low partial pressure of oxygen triggers the hatching of the egg and the tadpoles are released. If partial pressure of oxygen never decreases due to delayed flooding, development of the egg stalls.

== Conservation efforts ==
P. bibronii are widespread throughout Queensland, Australia. The Flora and Fauna Guarantee Act of 1988 designated the species as threatened and the International Union for Conservation of Nature (IUCN) designated the frog as Least concern. Increasing drought in the Australian grasslands has caused a decrease in frog populations overall. The drought has caused once lush paddocks to turn to barren fields, creating fewer places for the P. bibronii to burrow. There has been increasing habitat loss for these frogs causing a significant decline in the population. However, P. bibronii populations are enduring and can still be heard in the woodlands during mating season. Tracking these frogs is also very difficult as they are very secretive and cryptic, thus it is hard to get an accurate population count of the species.

On February 7, 2004, wildfires burned down many natural areas in the Melbourne area. This fire burned down many natural habitats of P. bibronii causing a steep decline in their population levels in disturbed habitats. The impact of these fires is thought to have affected the mortality rates of adult frogs, amount of territory for breeding, and overall habitat loss. Efforts have been made to track changes in P. bibronii population size before and after the fires, but the lack of pre-fire data has made it hard to make any conclusions about the effects of the fire on the population.
