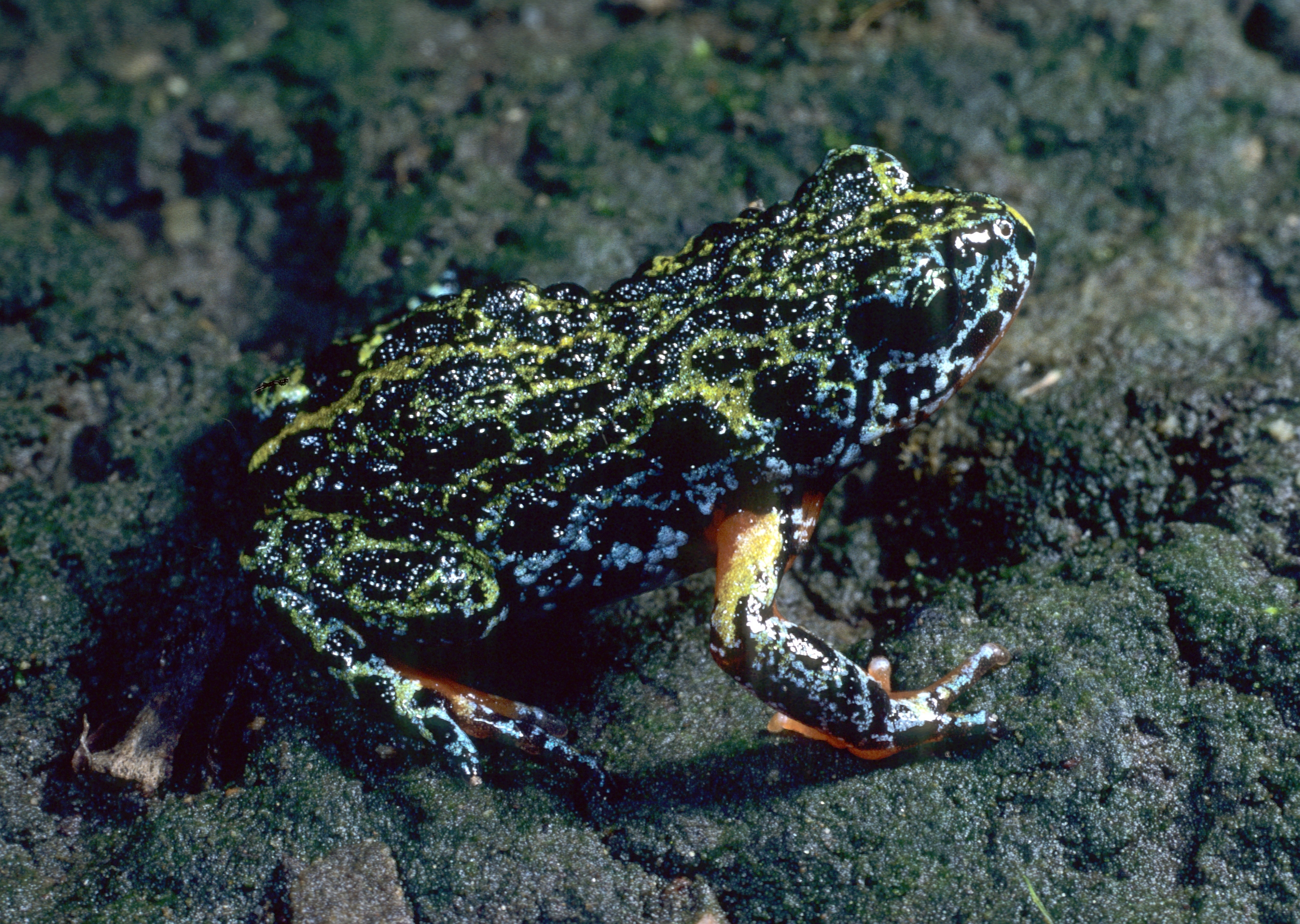
- Southern toadlet

Scientific classification
- Domain: Eukaryota
- Kingdom: Animalia
- Phylum: Chordata
- Class: Amphibia
- Order: Anura
- Family: Myobatrachidae
- Genus: Pseudophryne
- Species: P. semimarmorata

Binomial name
- Pseudophryne semimarmorata Lucas, 1892

= Southern toadlet =

Species of Australian frog

The southern toadlet (Pseudophryne semimarmorata), or marbled toadlet, is a species of small frog that is endemic to south-eastern Australia.

== Description ==
The species grows to about 20–30 mm in length (SVL). The upper body is dark brown to olive green, with black warty blotches. The underparts, which are smooth in females and granular in males, are very distinctively marked, being mainly yellow, orange or red in colour with a broad band of black and white, or black and blue, marbling that covers the chest and upper belly. The toes are unwebbed.

== Behaviour ==
Breeding takes place from late summer to early winter. The males make burrows in areas likely to flood after rain from which they call between late March and early May and where the females lay loose clusters of eggs. Following rain, the tadpoles are washed into pools and other wetlands, where they change into small toadlets from late spring.

== Distribution and habitat ==
The westernmost part of the species’ range is in the extreme south-east of South Australia, extending across southern Victoria, mainly south of the Great Dividing Range, to Flinders Island and northern and eastern Tasmania. The frogs are found in damp areas at lower elevations in grasslands, heathlands, woodlands and forests where they shelter beneath rocks, logs and leaf litter.

== Conservation ==
The species’ population is thought to be declining. Threats include the fungal disease chytridiomycosis, habitat clearance and degradation, as well the effects of climate change on bushfire frequency and severity.
