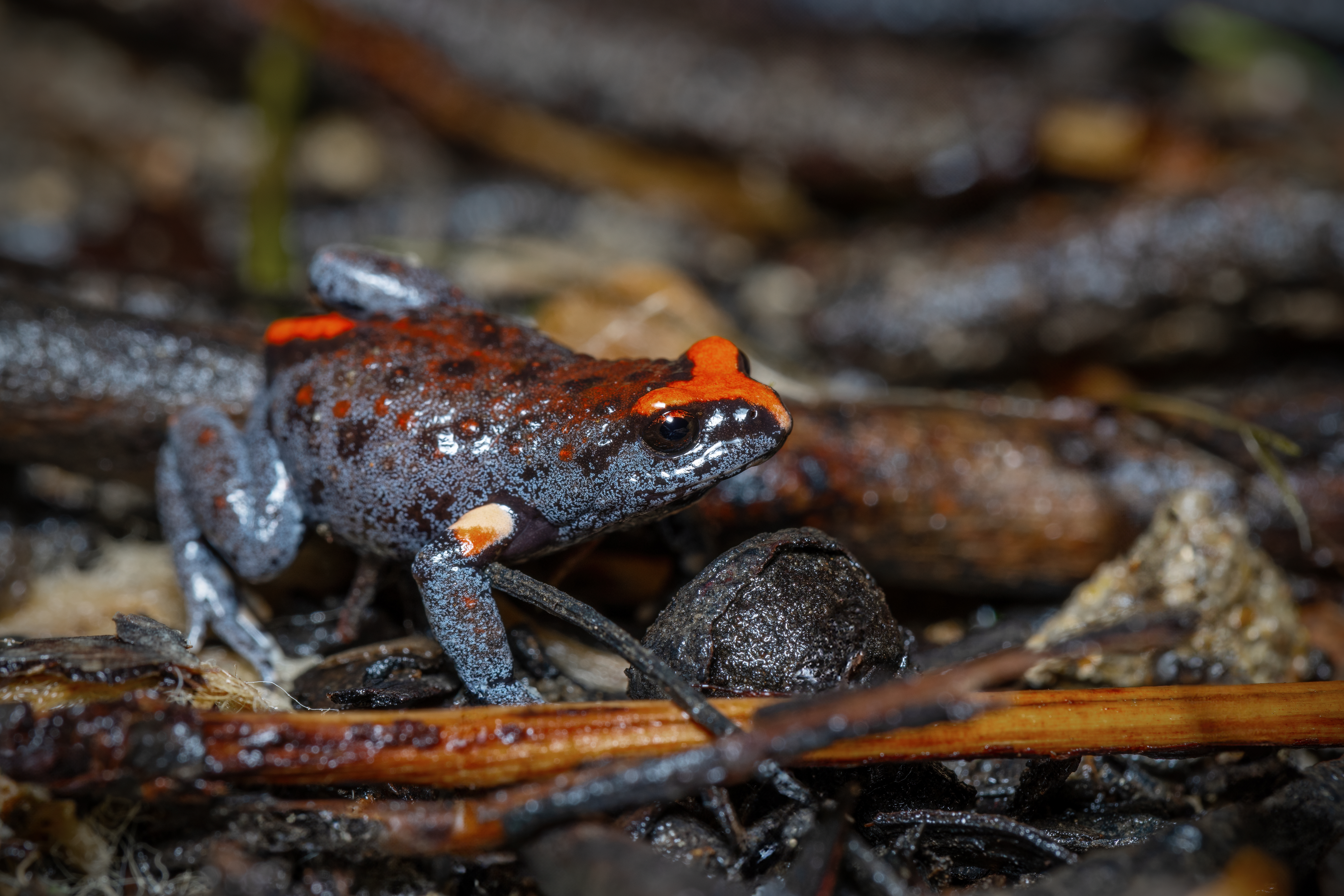

Conservation status
- Near Threatened (IUCN 3.1)

Scientific classification
- Kingdom: Animalia
- Phylum: Chordata
- Class: Amphibia
- Order: Anura
- Family: Myobatrachidae
- Genus: Pseudophryne
- Species: P. australis

Binomial name
- Pseudophryne australis Gray, 1835
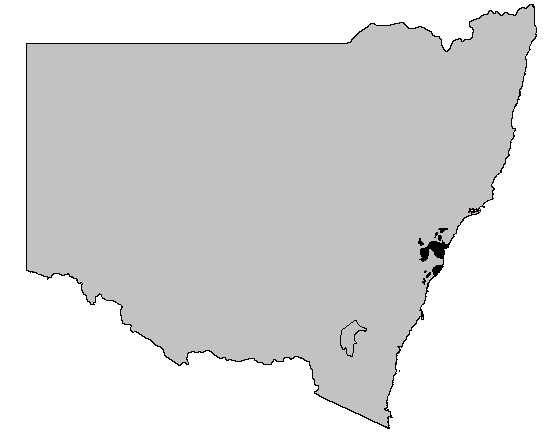
- Distribution of the red-crowned toadlet in NSW

= Red-crowned toadlet =

Species of amphibian

The red-crowned toadlet (Pseudophryne australis) is a species of Australian ground frog, restricted to the Sydney Basin, New South Wales. It is only found around sandstone escarpment areas around Sydney, from Ourimbah in the north, Nowra to the south and the Blue Mountains areas to the west.

== Description ==
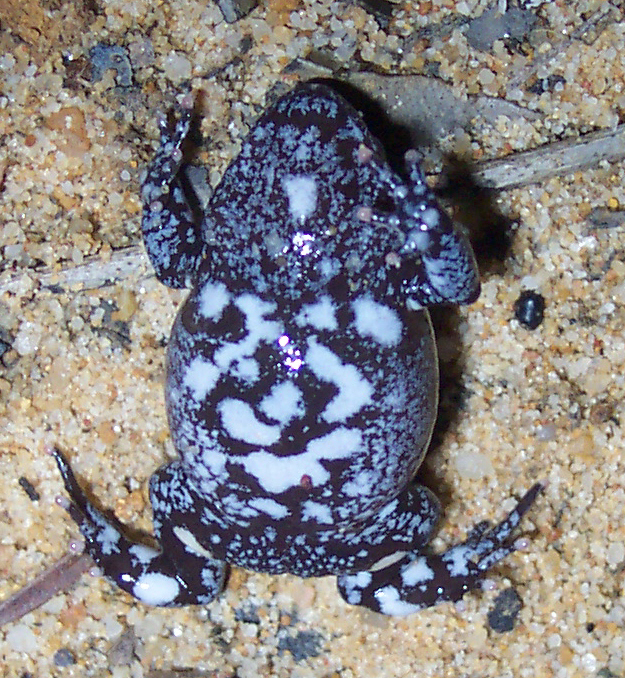
Ventral surface, showing strong marbling

This is a small species of frog, reaching 30 mm in length. It is characterised by the red T-shaped mark on its head. It is dark brown or black above with a red wash or spots over its back, and a red mark near the vent. The sides are a blue-grey and there is a white mark in the armpits and thighs. The ventral surface is very strongly marbled black and white, with a bluish colour in some areas between the black and white.

== Ecology and behaviour ==
This species is only found around temporary creeks and soaks in sandstone habitats in woodland, heathland and dry sclerophyll forest around the Sydney basin.

Males make an ark call from nest sites under leaf litter and rocks, in areas likely to be inundated, generally only after heavy rain. Eggs are laid under leaf litter and tadpoles begin developing inside the egg, the males stays with the eggs in the nest. Once heavy rain floods the nest site the eggs hatch and the tadpoles (already fairly developed) finish their development in the temporary pools. In Sydney it is often found in the same habitats as Giant Burrowing Frogs.

This species has declined due to urbanisation around Sydney.

== Sources ==
- Frog and tadpole Study Group
- Frog Australia Network-Frog call available here.
- Anstis, M. 2002. Tadpoles of South-eastern Australia. Reed New Holland: Sydney.
