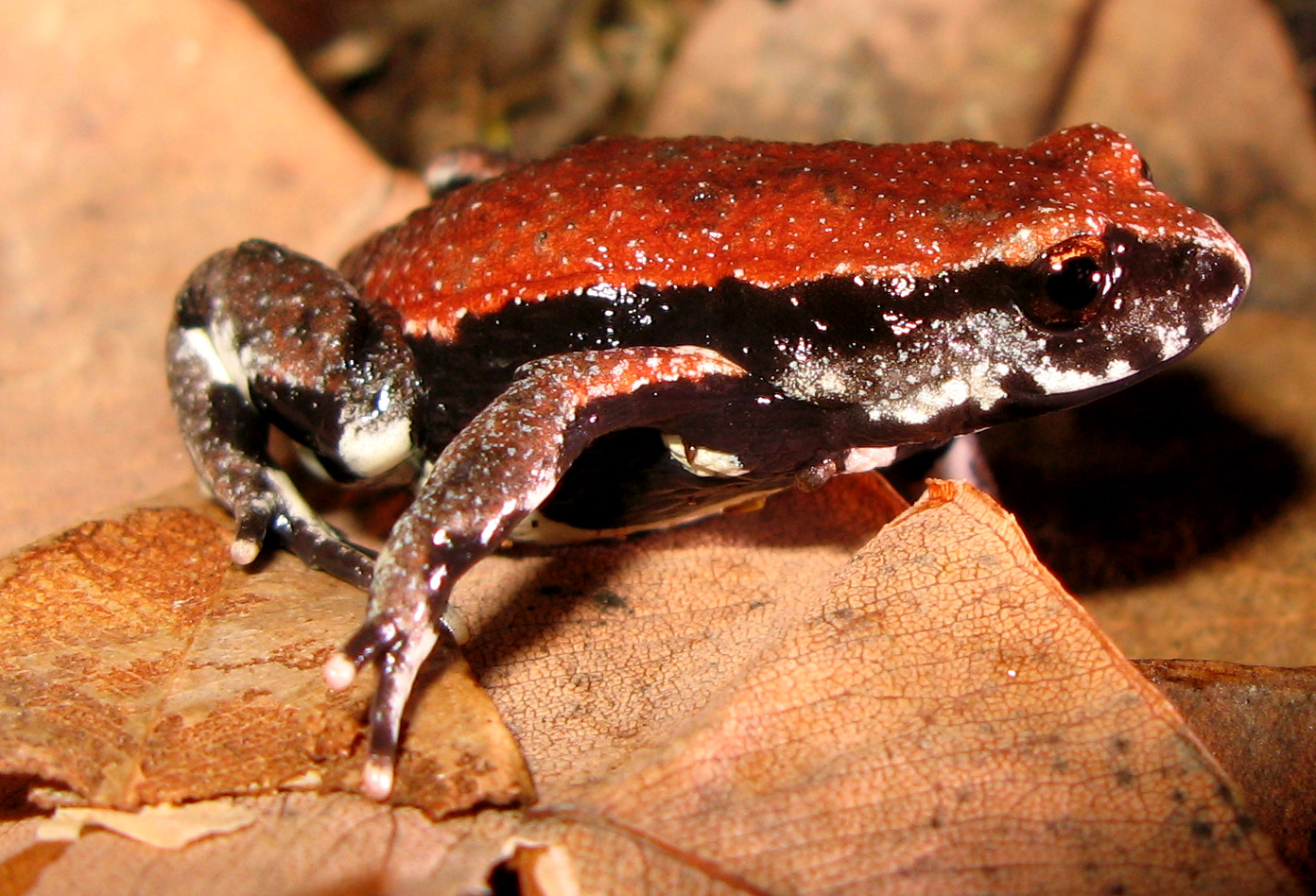

Conservation status
- Least Concern (IUCN 3.1)

Scientific classification
- Kingdom: Animalia
- Phylum: Chordata
- Class: Amphibia
- Order: Anura
- Family: Myobatrachidae
- Genus: Pseudophryne
- Species: P. coriacea

Binomial name
- Pseudophryne coriacea Keferstein, 1868
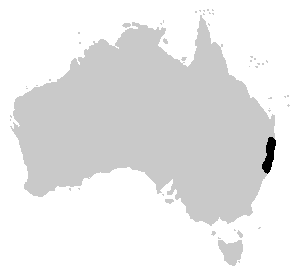
- Range of the red-backed toadlet

= Red-backed toadlet =

Species of amphibian

The red-backed toadlet (Pseudophryne coriacea) is a species of ground frog native to the coast and adjacent ranges of eastern Australia, from just north of Sydney to South-eastern Queensland.

== Description ==
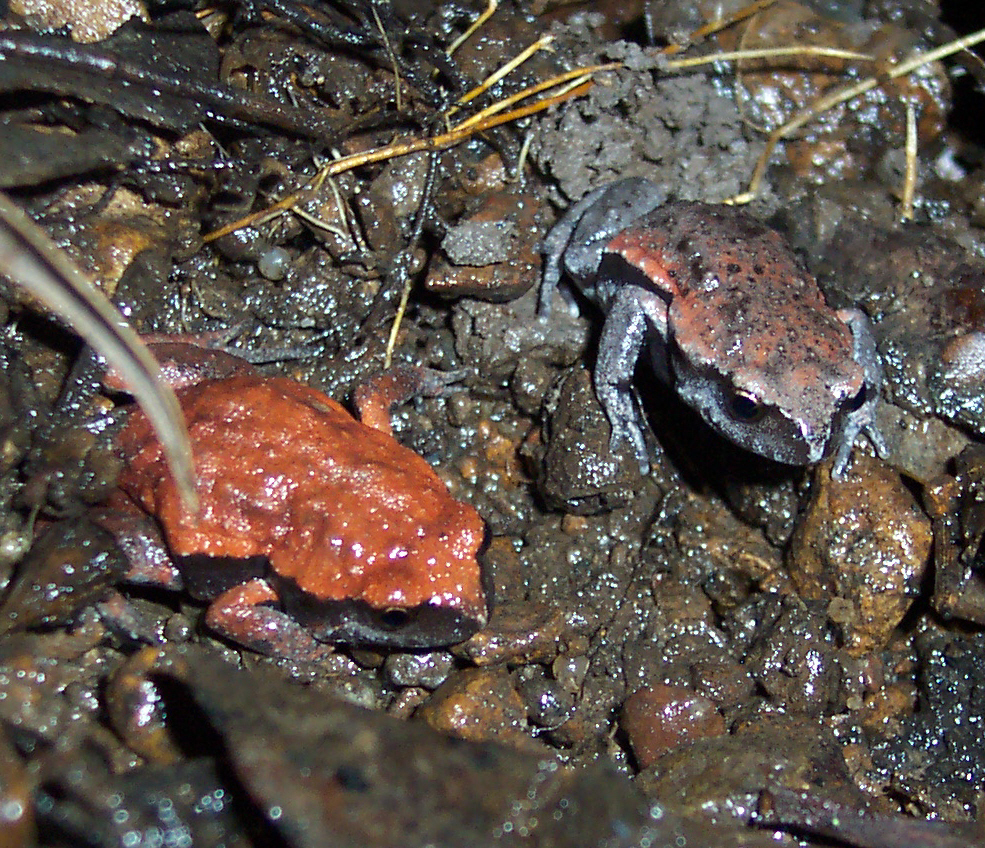
Two red-backed toadlets, normal red colouration on left, rare grey-red morph on right

This species of frog reaches about 35mm in length. It is normally red, from red-orange or red-brown on the dorsal surface, however on occasion grey-red colour morphs can occur (see image). There is a dark (normally black) "dividing" line present right down the entire side of the frog, starting from the nostril. This line separates the red dorsal surface from the strongly marbled black and white ventral surface. There is a white spot in the pits.

== Ecology and behaviour ==
This species is normally associated with rainforest and wet sclerophyll forest, however it is also found in dry sclerophyll forest, woodland and at times cleared areas. It is normally found in areas that are frequently flooded such as roadside ditches, creeks and temporary pools. The diet of this toadlet is similar to the diet of P. bibronii, feeding mostly on small invertebrates present in the leaf litter.

Males make an "ark" call, similar to most Pseudophryne species, but it is slightly more of an elongated note compared to P. australis and P. bibronii. Males call from under moist leaf litter and rotting logs, during spring, summer and autumn, they breed after rain. As with other Pseudophryne species the male stays with the eggs in the nest site and may mate with more than one female. Eggs are laid in the nest site and tadpoles hatch after heavy rain floods the nest site and the develop in the temporary pools. Tadpole development is relatively short, due to the ephemeral nature of the pools in which they dwell.

== Sources ==
- Anstis, M. 2002. Tadpoles of South-eastern Australia. Reed New Holland: Sydney.
- Robinson, M. 2002. A Field Guide to Frogs of Australia. Australian Museum/Reed New Holland: Sydney.
- Frogs Australia Network-frog call available here.
