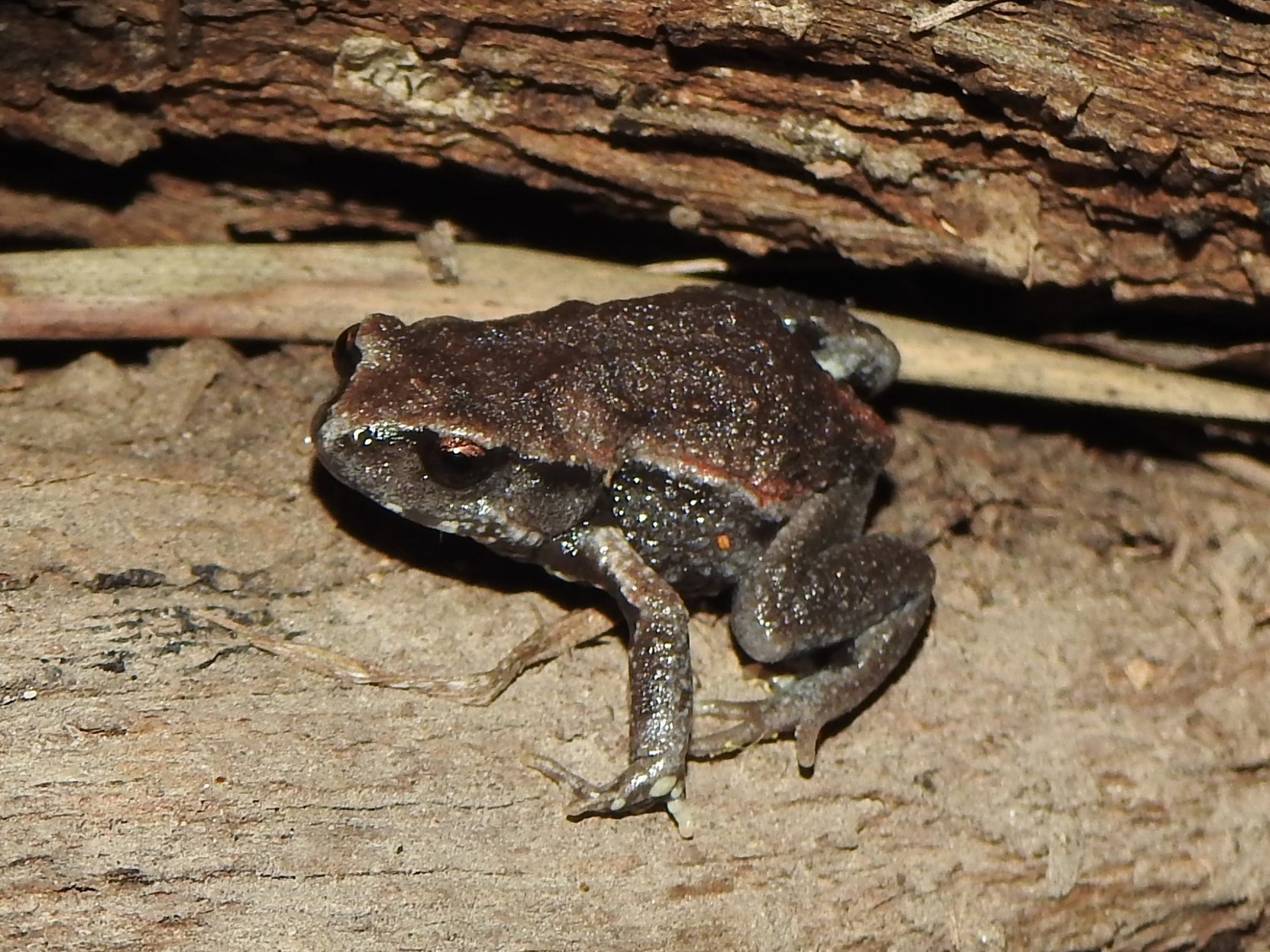

Conservation status
- Least Concern (IUCN 3.1)

Scientific classification
- Kingdom: Animalia
- Phylum: Chordata
- Class: Amphibia
- Order: Anura
- Family: Myobatrachidae
- Genus: Pseudophryne
- Species: P. raveni

Binomial name
- Pseudophryne raveni Ingram & Corben, 1994

= Copper-backed brood frog =

Species of amphibian

The copper-backed brood frog (Pseudophryne raveni) is a species of frog in the family Myobatrachidae. It is endemic to Australia. Its natural habitats are temperate forests, subtropical or tropical dry forests, rivers, intermittent rivers, freshwater marshes, and intermittent freshwater marshes from Mount Tamborine to Nerang.

== Description ==
Not to be confused with the cane toad Rhinella marina, this toadlet is native to Australia and can be easily distinguished by the following characteristics. Both males and females of this species reach an adult length of 30 millimetres (1.2 in). Its back will be a dark black-red brown or copper. Sides are coppery grey with a distinct black stripe extending from its nostril through its eye, along its sides conjoining with the base of the hind legs. Belly is a marbled black and white.

== Reproduction ==
Males emit a drawn out eeaaaaak sound from below cover on solid ground. Large eggs are laid in moist soil or in chambers excavated by the male under forest floor debris.
