= Envelysin =

Class of enzymes

Identifiers
- EC no.: 3.4.24.12
- CAS no.: 50812-13-0

Databases
- IntEnz: IntEnz view
- BRENDA: BRENDA entry
- ExPASy: NiceZyme view
- KEGG: KEGG entry
- MetaCyc: metabolic pathway
- PRIAM: profile
- PDB structures: RCSB PDB PDBe PDBsum
Search
- PMC: articles
- PubMed: articles
- NCBI: proteins

Envelysin (EC 3.4.24.12, sea-urchin-hatching proteinase, hatching enzyme, chorionase, chorion-digesting proteinase, chymostrypsin, sea urchin embryo hatching enzyme) is an enzyme. This enzyme catalyses the following chemical reaction

Hydrolysis of proteins of the fertilization envelope and dimethylcasein

This enzyme is a glycoprotein from various members of the class Echinoidea.
