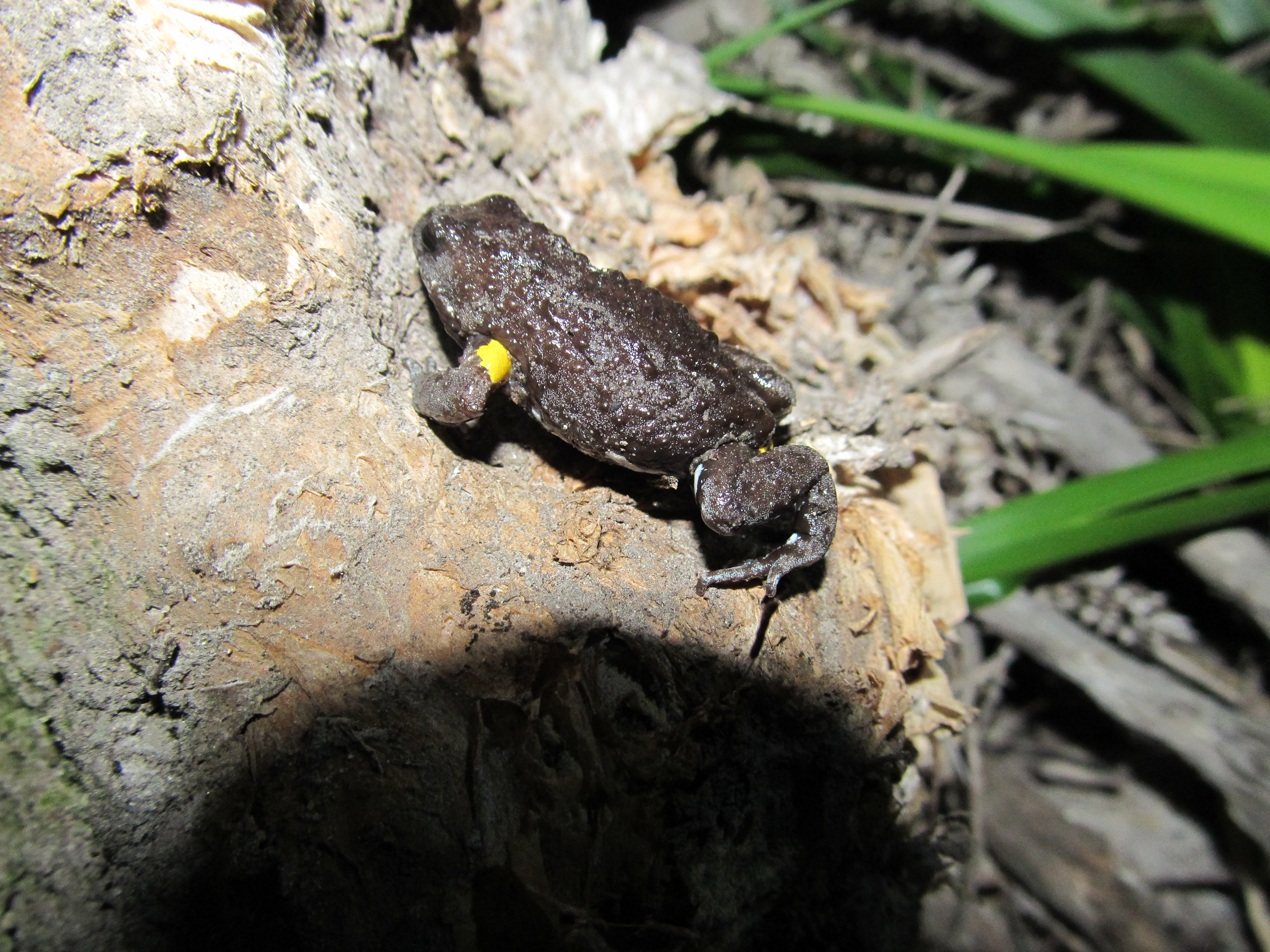

Conservation status
- Least Concern (IUCN 3.1)

Scientific classification
- Kingdom: Animalia
- Phylum: Chordata
- Class: Amphibia
- Order: Anura
- Family: Myobatrachidae
- Genus: Pseudophryne
- Species: P. dendyi

Binomial name
- Pseudophryne dendyi H. Lucas, 1892

= Dendy's toadlet =

Species of frog

Dendy's toadlet (Pseudophryne dendyi) is a species of frog in the family Myobatrachidae. It is endemic to Australia. Its natural habitats are temperate forests, temperate grassland, rivers, intermittent rivers, swamps, and intermittent freshwater marshes.
