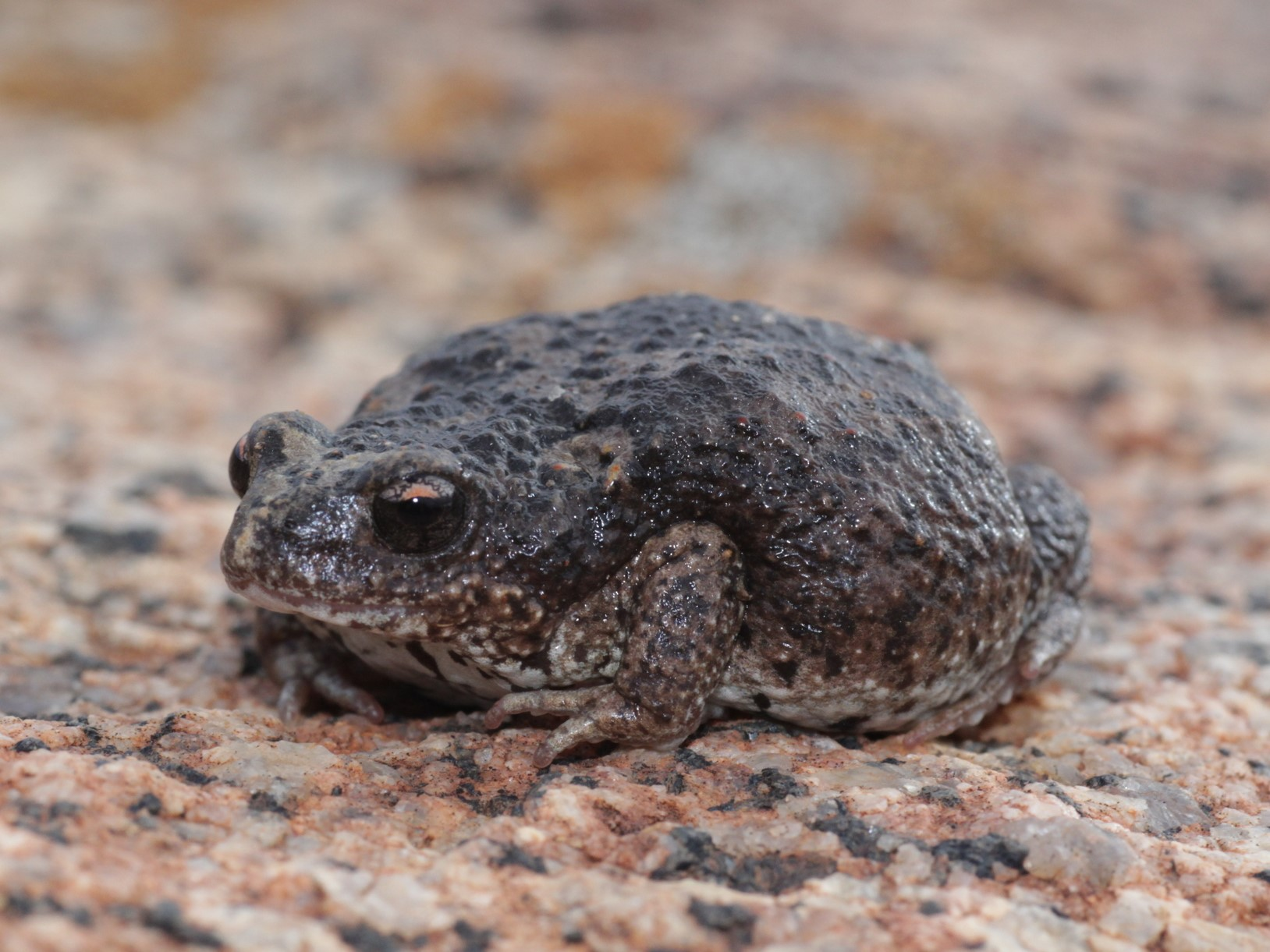

Conservation status
- Least Concern (IUCN 3.1)

Scientific classification
- Kingdom: Animalia
- Phylum: Chordata
- Class: Amphibia
- Order: Anura
- Family: Myobatrachidae
- Genus: Pseudophryne
- Species: P. occidentalis

Binomial name
- Pseudophryne occidentalis Parker, 1940

= Orange-crowned toadlet =

Species of frog

The orange-crowned toadlet (Pseudophryne occidentalis), or western toadlet, is a species of frog in the family Myobatrachidae. It is endemic to Australia. Its natural habitats are temperate shrubland, Mediterranean-type shrubby vegetation, intermittent rivers, intermittent freshwater lakes, freshwater marshes, intermittent freshwater marshes, and rocky areas.
