= Albert Günther =

German-born British zoologist (1830–1914)

Albert Günther FRS
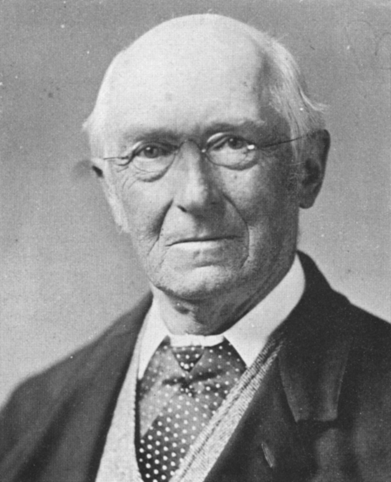
- Born: Albert Charles Lewis Gotthilf Günther; 3 October 1830; Esslingen, Germany
- Died: 1 February 1914 (aged 83); Kew Gardens, Richmond-on-Thames, England
- Citizenship: United Kingdom
- Education: University of Tübingen
- Known for: Description of more than 340 reptile species, Catalogue of Fishes
- Awards: Linnean Medal (1904)
- Scientific career
- Fields: Zoologist
- Institutions: British Museum
- Author abbrev. (zoology): Günther

Albert Karl Ludwig Gotthilf Günther FRS, also Albert Charles Lewis Gotthilf Günther (3 October 1830 – 1 February 1914), was a German-born British zoologist, ichthyologist, and herpetologist. Günther is ranked the second-most productive reptile taxonomist (after George Albert Boulenger) with more than 340 reptile species described and the third-most productive fish taxonomist with about 1600 fish species described.

== Early life and career ==
Günther was born in Esslingen in Swabia (Württemberg). His father Friedrich Gotthilf Günther (1800–1835) was a Stiftungs-Commissar in Esslingen and his mother, Eleonora Louise née Nagel (1806–1899)l, was from Bremen. He initially schooled at the Stuttgart Gymnasium. His family wished him to train for the ministry of the Lutheran Church for which he moved to the University of Tübingen. A brother shifted from theology to medicine, and he, too, turned to science and medicine at Tübingen in 1852. His first work was "Ueber den Puppenzustand eines Distoma" (On the pupal state of Distoma). He graduated in medicine with an M.D. from Tübingen in 1858, the same year in which he published a handbook of zoology for students of medicine. His mother moved to England, and when he visited the country in 1855, he met John Edward Gray and Professor Richard Owen at the British Museum. This led to an offer to work at the British Museum in 1857, where his first task was to classify 2000 snake specimens. After the death of John Edward Gray in 1875, Günther was appointed Keeper of Zoology at the Natural History Museum, a position he held until 1895. The major work of his life was the eight-volume Catalogue of Fishes (1859–1870, Ray Society). He also worked on the reptiles and amphibians in the museum collection. In 1864, he founded the Record of Zoological Literature and served as editor for six years. He was one of the editors for the Annals and Magazine of Natural History for more than thirty years. His landmark paper on tuatara anatomy was the first to establish that the tuatara reptile was not a lizard, but in fact the only living member of an entirely new group of reptiles, which he named Rhynchocephalia. Fossil and genetic evidence have subsequently confirmed Günther's assertion, and the tuatara is now recognised as the only living member of a once diverse lineage that shared a common ancestor with Squamata (lizards and snakes) over 240 million years ago.

== Royal Society ==
Günther was elected fellow of the Royal Society in 1867 and served as vice-president 1875–6. He served on the council of the Zoological Society for nearly 40 years (1868–1905). He was elected a fellow of the Linnaean Society in 1877 and was president 1896–1900. He became a naturalised British citizen in 1874. Günther died at Kew Gardens on 1 February 1914.

== Family ==
Günther married, firstly, in 1868, Roberta Mitchell née McIntosh (1842–1869), sister of William M'Intosh. They had one son, the historian Robert William Theodore Günther (1869–1940). Roberta died shortly after his birth.

In 1879 he married again, to Theodora Dowrish née Drake (1863–1944). They had a son Frederic Albert Günther (1883–1953), a merchant; and a daughter Theodora Alberta Günther (1889–1908) who died aged nineteen.

== Taxon described by him ==
- See Category:Taxa named by Albert Günther

== Legacy ==
Albert Günther is commemorated in the scientific names of many species of reptiles.

- Aparallactus guentheri – an African venomous snake
- Aspidura guentheri – a Sri Lankan snake
- Atractus guentheri – a Brazilian snake
- Chalcides guentheri – a Near Eastern lizard
- Christinus guentheri – an Australian lizard
- Coluber gracilis– an Indian snake, known as Günther's racer
- Draco guentheri – a Philippine lizard
- Elapsoidea guentherii – an African venomous snake
- Erythrolamprus albertguentheri – a South American snake
- Erythrolamprus guentheri – a South American snake
- Euspondylus guentheri – a South American lizard
- Holaspis guentheri – an African lizard
- Lycodryas guentheri – a Malagasy snake
- Monopeltis guentheri – an African amphisbaenian
- Perochirus guentheri – a South Pacific lizard
- Phelsuma guentheri – a Mauritian lizard
- Plectrurus guentheri – an Indian snake
- Proctoporus guentheri – a South American lizard
- Ramphotyphlops guentheri – an Australian snake
- Riopa guentheri – an Indian lizard
- Ristella guentheri – an Indian lizard
- Scelotes guentheri – an extinct South African lizard
- Sphenodon guntheri – a New Zealand rhynchocephalian
- Stegonotus guentheri – a Papua New Guinean snake
- Stenocercus guentheri – a South American lizard
- Trachischium guentheri – an Asian snake
- Uroplatus guentheri – a Malagasy lizard
- Urotheca guentheri – a Central American snake
- Xenodon guentheri – a Brazilian snake

Amphibians

- The Brazilian Frog, Boana guentheri (Boulenger, 1886)
- The Solomon Island Leaf Frog Cornufer guentheri (Boulenger, 1884
- The Andean Frog Gastrotheca guentheri (Boulenger, 1882)
- The South American Frog, Ischnocnema guentheri (Steindachner, 1864)
- The Southern Crested Toad Peltophryne guentheri (Cochran, 1941)
- The Caribbean Toad Peltophryne guentheri (Cochran, 1941)
- An Asian frog, Sylvirana guentheri (Boulenger, 1882)
- Günther's toadlet

As well as fish:

- The carnivorous species of catfish Astroblepus guentheri (Boulenger, 1887)
- The Crochet Butterfly fish, Chaetodon guentheri C. G. E. Ahl, 1923
- Lepidotrigla guentheri Hilgendorf, 1879
- The African killifish, Nothobranchius guentheri (Pfeffer, 1893) (Red-tail nothobranchius)

== Selected publications ==
- Günther, Albert (1858). Handbuch der Medicinischen Zoologie.
- Günther, Albert (1858). Catalogue of the Batrachia salientia in the collection of the British Museum. London.
- Günther, Albert (1858). "On the Geographical Distribution of Reptiles". Proceedings of the Zoological Society of London 1858: 373–389.
- Günther, Albert (1859–1870). Catalogue of the Fishes in the British Museum, eight volumes.
- Günther, Albert (1863). "On new Species of Snakes in the Collection of the British Museum". Annals and Magazine of Natural History, Third Series 11: 20–25.
- Günther, Albert (1863). "Third account of new species of snakes in the collection of the British Museum". Sep. Ann. Mag. Nat. Hist., 1–17.
- Günther, Albert (1864). "Report on a collection of Reptiles and Fishes made by Dr. Kirk in the Zambesi and Nyassa regions". Sep. Proc. Zool. Soc. London, 1–12.
- Günther, Albert (1864). "Descriptions of new species of Batrachians from West Africa". Sep. Proc. Zool. Soc. London, 1–4. (Folha manuscrita por Bocage no interior com descrição de Cystignathus Bocagei de Bolama).
- Günther, Albert (1865). "Fourth account of new species of snakes in the collection of the British Museum". Sep. Annals Mag. Nat. Hist., 1–10.
- Günther, Albert (1867). "Contribution to the anatomy of Hatteria (Rhynchocephalus, Owen)". Sep. Philosophical Transactions. II: 1–36.
- Günther, Albert (1867). "Descriptions of some new or little-known species of Fishes in the collection of the British Museum". Proc. Zool. Soc. London, 24 Jan.: 99–104, 1 estampa.
- Günther, Albert (1868). "First account of species of tailless Batrachians added to the collection of the British Museum". Proc. Zool. Soc. London. III: 478–490.
- Günther, Albert (1868). Sixth account of new species of snakes in the collection of the British Museum. Sep. Annals Mag. Nat. Hist., 1–17.
- Günther, Albert (1868). First account of species of Tailless Batrachians added to the collection of the British Museum. Proceedings of the Zoological Society of London (III), 25 June: 478–490. 4 pranchas.
- Günther, Albert (1868). Report on a collection of Fishes made at St. Helena by J.C. Meliss. Proceedings of the Zoological Society of London (II): 225–228.1 estampa.
- Günther, Albert (1868). Descriptions of freshwater Fishes made from Surinam and Brazil. Proceedings of the Zoological Society of London (II): 229–246. 3 estampas.
- Günther, Albert (1870). Catalogue of the Fishes in the British Museum. London. 8 vols., online text, hathitrust.org
- Günther, Albert (1872). Seventh account of new species of snakes in the collection of the British Museum. Annals Mag. Nat. Hist., 13–37.
- Günther, Albert (1874). Description of a new European species of Zootoca. Annals and Magazine of Natural History, August.
- Günther, Albert (1874). Descriptions of some new or imperfectly known species of Reptiles from the Camaroon Mountains. Proceedings of the Zoological Society of London, 16 June: 444–445. Plate 56 – Chamaeleon montium Buckholz, 1874. B – juvenil. Pl. 57: Rhampholeon spectrum Buckholz e Bothrolycus ater sp. nov. . Del. G.H. Ford..
- Günther, Albert (1875). Second report on collection of Indian Reptiles obtained by the British Museum. Proceedings of the Zoological Society of London, 16 March : 224–234. Plates XXX-XXXIV. Col. Tenente Beddome no Sul da Índia e Dr. Jerdon no Norte e nos Himalaias. Plate 30 – Calotes grandisquamis Günther, 1875 – col. Bedomme no sopé do Canoot Ghat; Pl. XXXIV – Trimeresurus jerdoni sp. nov. – Jerdon, Khassya. G.H. Ford del.
- Günther, Albert (1875). Third report on collections of Indian Reptiles obtained by the British Museum. From the Proceedings of the Zoological Society of London: 567–577. 4 estampas.
- Günther, Albert (1876). Statement regarding dr. Welwitsch's Angola Reptiles. Jornal de Sciencias Mathematicas, Physicas e Naturaes, Academia Real das Sciencias de Lisboa, V (20): 275–276. Welwitsch. Seguem declarações de J.V. Barboza du Bocage.
- Günther, Albert (1876). Notes on a small collection brought by Lieut. L. Cameron, from Angola. Proceedings of the Zoological Society of London, pág. 678. Herpetologia. Ahaetulla dorsalis (Bocage). Reptilia. Serpentes.
- Günther, A. (1876). Remarks on Fishes, with Descriptions of new Species in the British Museum, chiefly from the Southern Seas. The Annals and Magazine of Natural History. Volume XVII, Fourth Series.
- Günther, A. (1876). Remarks on some Indian and, more especially, Bornean Mammals. Proceedings of the Zoological Society of London, III: 424–428. Plate XXXVII – Viverra megaspila Blyth, 1863. J.G. Keulemans del.
- Günther, A. (1876). Carta para Bocage, do Zoological Department (British Museum), 26 de Junho, a falar de Welwitsch. Arquivo histórico do Museu Bocage, CE/G-88.
- Günther, A (1877). "Notice of two large extinct lizards formerly inhabiting the Mascarene Islands". Sep. Linnean Society's Journal – Zoology. 13 (69): 321–328. doi:10.1111/j.1096-3642.1877.tb01387.x.
- Günther, A. (1877). The gigantic land tortoises (living and extinct) in the collection of the British Museum.
- Günther, Albert (1878). – On Reptiles from Midian collected by Major Burton. From the Proceedings of the Zoological Society of London: 977–978. 1 estampa.
- Günther, A. (1879). The extinct reptiles of Rodriguez. Sep. Philosoph. Trans. Roy. Soc, 168 (extra-vol.), London: 470–472.
- Günther, Albert (1879). List of the Mammals, Reptiles, and Batrachians sent by Mr. Everett from the Philippine Islands. Proceedings of the Zoological Society, London, 14 January: 74–79. Plate IV – Dendrophis philippinensis Günther, 1879 – Norte de Mindanao. Del. R. Mintern.
- Günther, Albert (1880). An Introduction to the Study of Fishes.
- Günther, Albert (1882). Observations on some rare Reptiles and a Batrachian now or lately living in the Society's Menagerie. Transactions of the Zoological Society, London VI, part VII (1) : 215–222, pl. 42–46. Chelys fimbriata (Schneid.) – a Matamata habita as águas estagnada do Brasil e Guiana. Pl. 43–44: Metopoceros cornutus (Wagler). A imagem representa o segundo exemplar chegado aos museus da Europa, o primeiro pertencia ao Museu de Paris e tinha vindo de San Domingo. Deste não se conhece a proveniência exacta. Ceratothrys ornata (Bell). Tejus rufescens – Mendoza.
- Günther, A. (1884). Contributions to our Knowledge of Hydromedusa, a genus of South-American freshwater Turtles. Annals and Magazine of Natural History, Fifth Series, Volume XIV: 421–425. Plate XIV.
- Günther, A. (1884). Note on some East-African Antelopes supposed to be new. Annals and Magazine of Natural History, Fifth Series, Volume XIV: 425–429.
- Günther, Albert (1885). – Note on a supposed melanotic variety of the Leopard, from South Africa. From the Proceedings of the Zoological Society of London, 3 March: 243–245, estampa de Felis leopardus.
- Günther, A. (1888). Contribution to the knowledge of Snakes of Tropical Africa. Annals Mag. Nat. Hist., (6) 1: 322–335. Ahoetulla bocagei, sp. nov.. Angola.
- Günther, A. (1888). Report on a collection of Reptiles and Batrachians sent by Emin Pasha from Monbuttu, Upper Congo. Proc. Zool. Soc. London, 50–51.
- Günther, A. (1895). Notice of Reptiles and Batrachians collected in the Eastern Half of Tropical Africa. Annals Mag. Nat. Hist., (6) 15: 523–529.

== See also ==
- Robert Günther, Albert Günther's son and a historian of science
- Taxa named by Albert Günther
