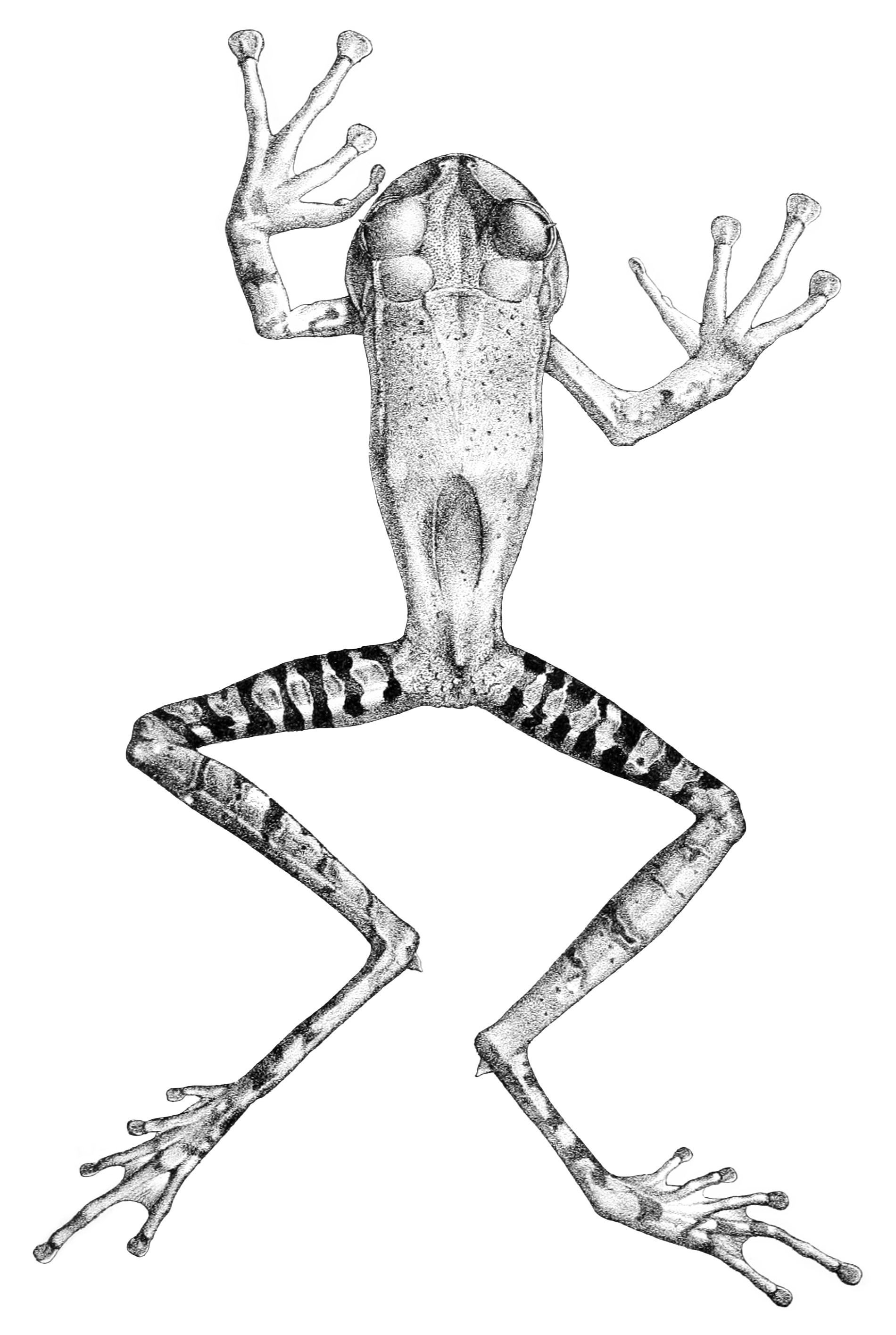

Conservation status
- Data Deficient (IUCN 3.1)

Scientific classification
- Kingdom: Animalia
- Phylum: Chordata
- Class: Amphibia
- Order: Anura
- Family: Hemiphractidae
- Genus: Gastrotheca
- Species: G. guentheri

Binomial name
- Gastrotheca guentheri (Boulenger, 1882)

Synonyms
- Amphignathodon guentheri Boulenger, 1882

= Gastrotheca guentheri =

Species of amphibian

Gastrotheca guentheri (common names: Guenther's marsupial frog, dentate marsupial frog) is a species of frog in the family Hemiphractidae. It is found in the Andes of Colombia (Cordillera Occidental and Colombian Massif) and Ecuador (Cordillera Occidental). Gastrotheca guentheri is the only known frog with true teeth in both of its jaws, as indicated by the name of the genus it originally typified, Amphignathodon, described by George Albert Boulenger in 1882.

== Description ==
Gastrotheca guentheri is the only known frog with true teeth in its lower jaw. Its teeth have re-evolved after being absent for over 200 million years, challenging Dollo's law. Re-evolution of teeth in the lower jaw may have been made easier because the frogs have teeth in their upper jaw so there was already a biochemical pathway for developing teeth after 200 million years, unlike, say, birds. Biochemically, this may be an example of a suppressor of a regulatory gene disappearing.

Males measure 68–78 mm (2.7–3.1 in) and females 70–82 mm (2.8–3.2 in) in snout–vent length.

== Habitat and conservation ==
Natural habitats of Gastrotheca guentheri are tropical moist forests. These frogs are nocturnal and live on vegetation, including arboreal bromeliads.

This species is declining in abundance. One cause of the declines is habitat loss, but the species has also declined within suitable habitat in Ecuador, possibly because of climate change or chytridiomycosis.

Scientists have seen the frog in Parque Nacional Natural Munchique and near Reserva Ecológica Los Illinizas.

The last live individual of Gastrotheca guentheri to be sighted was recorded in Ecuador in 1996, and has not been seen on subsequent surveys. It is possible that the species is locally extinct in the country, or even extinct entirely. The status of the Colombian population is unknown due to a lack of extensive surveying.
