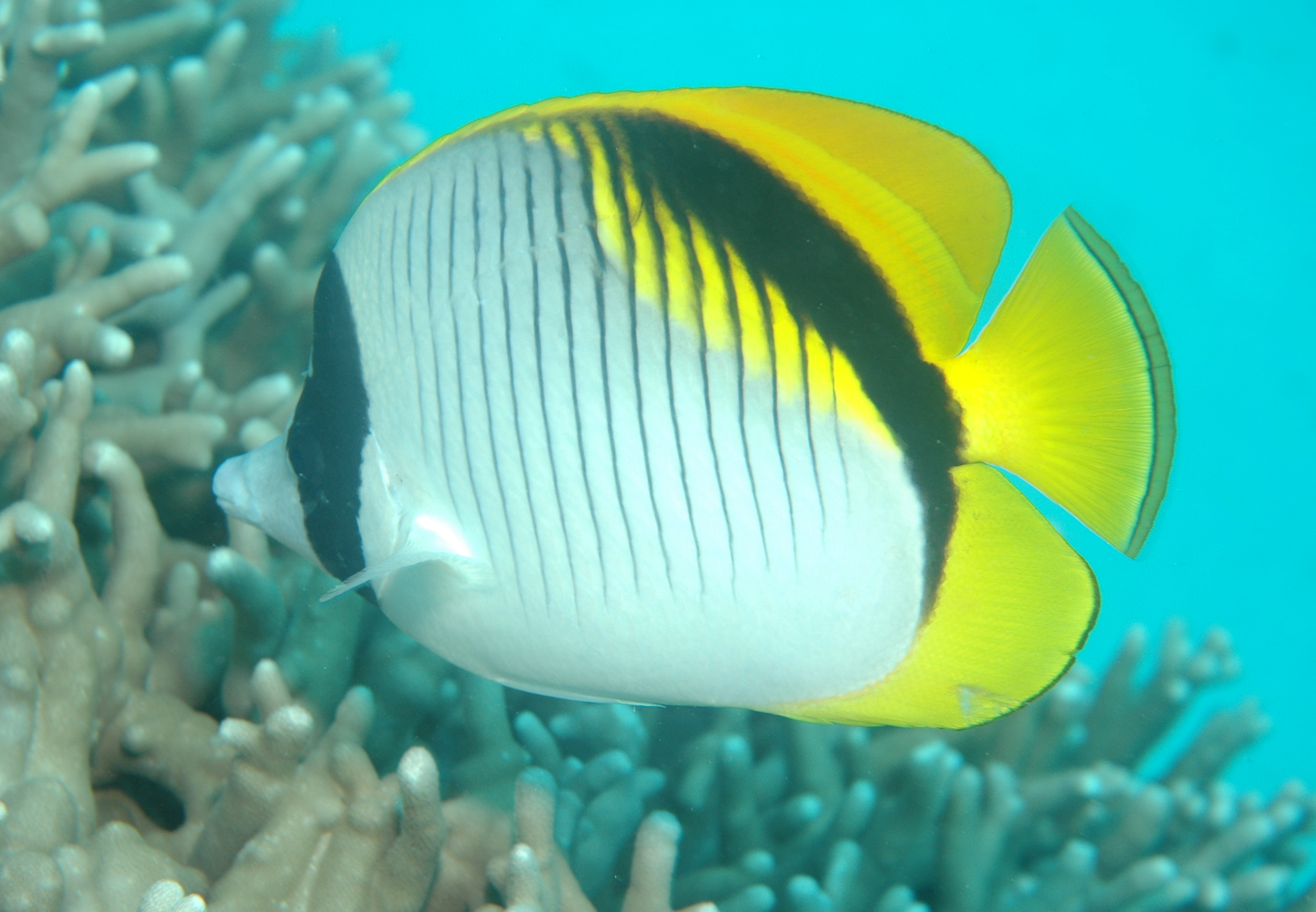

Conservation status
- Least Concern (IUCN 3.1)

Scientific classification
- Kingdom: Animalia
- Phylum: Chordata
- Class: Actinopterygii
- Order: Acanthuriformes
- Family: Chaetodontidae
- Genus: Chaetodon
- Subgenus: Chaetodon (Rabdophorus)
- Species: C. lineolatus

Binomial name
- Chaetodon lineolatus G. Cuvier, 1831

Synonyms
- Anisochaetodon lineolatus (Cuvier, 1831); Tetragonoptrus lineolatus (Cuvier, 1831); Chaetodon lunatus Cuvier, 1831; Chaetodon tallii Bleeker, 1854

= Lined butterflyfish =

Species of fish

The lined butterflyfish (Chaetodon lineolatus) is a species of marine ray-finned fish. a butterflyfish belonging to the family Chaetodontidae, one of the largest species in the genus Chaetodon. It has a wide range from the Red Sea to South Africa and as far east as southern Japan and Hawaii.

== Taxonomy ==
It belongs to the large subgenus Rabdophorus, which might warrant recognition as a distinct genus. In this group, it is sister to a clade composed of the spot-naped butterflyfish (C. oxycephalus), the peculiar black-wedged butterflyfish (C. falcula), and the Pacific double-saddle butterflyfish or "false falcula" (C. ulietensis). These four differ wildly in shape, but all have bluish vertical lines on a white body with yellow behind, and black on back and caudal peduncle in addition to the typical eyestripe of Chaetodon. The blue-cheeked butterflyfish (C. semilarvatus) is in turn sister to this entire clade, but it also has the tell-tale blue vertical lines.

== Description ==
Lined butterflyfish may grow up to 30 centimetres (12 in) long, which among Chaetodon is matched only by the saddle butterflyfish (C. ephippium), making them about as big as dinner plates. They are white in color, with thin black vertical bars which join a thick black band at the base of the tail and dorsal fin. The tail, dorsal, and anal fins are yellow.

== Distribution and habitat ==
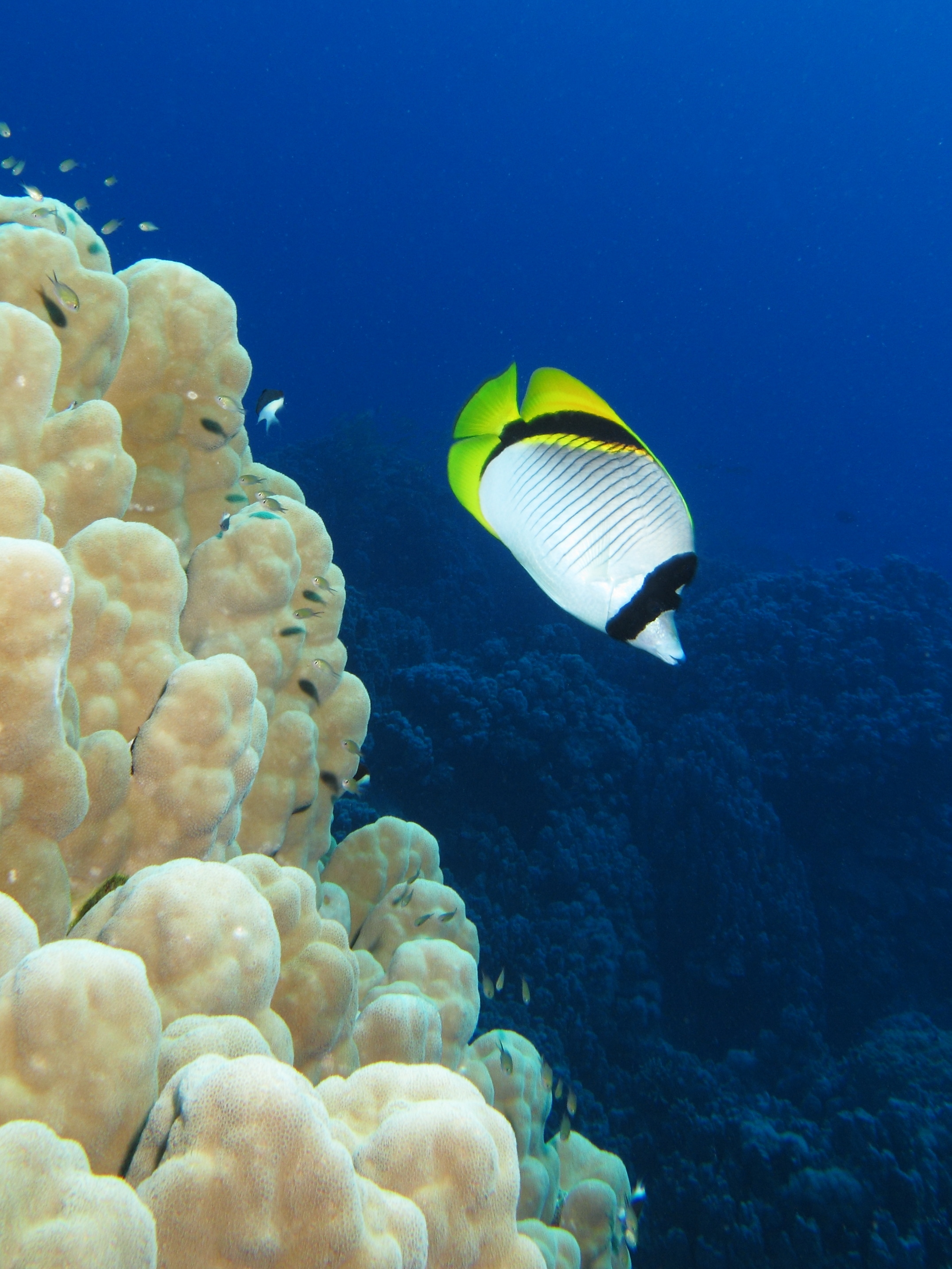
Lined Butterflyfish in the Red Sea, Egypt

The species occurs along the east coast of Africa including the Red Sea and Mozambique Channel, throughout Northern Australia including the Coral Sea, Gulf of Carpentaria, and Timor Sea, and throughout West Indo-Pacific including the Java Sea, South China Sea, Philippine Sea, and Celebes Sea.

This uncommon fish is found in pairs or swimming alone, or occasionally in spawning aggregations. It occurs between 2 and 50 m depth, in coral-rich areas of reefs and lagoons.

== Ecology ==
Coral polyps, small anemones, algae and invertebrates make up the lined butterflyfish's diet. It is known to be territorial. This territorialism is connected to their highly specific feeding habits that is located on certain areas.

The species can reach an age of up to ten years.

=== Development ===
Larvae of fish in the family Chaetodontidae have a random distribution pattern causing them to settle either in the same habitats as adult conspecifics; habitats with high coral cover; or habitats completely different from those used by adult conspecifics. Juveniles that are not in an adult habitat live in their current habitat until reaching maturity. Once they reached post-settlement growth of greater than 100 mm, they migrate to adult habitats if they are not already in that environment.

=== Reproduction ===
Very little is known about the spawning of butterflyfish as a whole, however it is believed that they spawn near their feeding habitats during new moon. The lined butterflyfish mates in lifelong monogamous relationships. However, the male chooses to either stay with its one mate or leave and find another mate. This appears to maximize their fecundity. Lined butterflyfish are social maters, meaning they spend time with their mate outside of just spawning often living together in the same habitat. The species however exhibits little to no parental care to their young.

=== Predation ===
The species is preyed on by many larger marine predators including sharks, eels, and snappers; predation may be intensified by loss of habitats and feeding grounds.

=== Ecosystem roles ===
Corals and members of the family Chaetodontidae were thought to have a commensal relationship. Coral provides the butterflyfish with food and shelter while coral gets little to nothing in return. However, upon further investigation it seems that C. lineolatus and other corallivore members of Chaetodontidae pose a bigger threat to coral than previously understood. Corallivores disturb the growth of coral species. This predation may have a long-term effect of on reef biodiversity. The loss of habitat affects reef fishes, including the Chaetodontidae, by making them more prone to predation from larger fishes.

== Conservation status ==
The species is classified as Least Concern by the IUCN due to its wide distribution and presence in protected areas. Its biggest threat is the loss of habitat via coral reef degradation, due to the overdevelopment and over-use of coral reefs and their resources.
