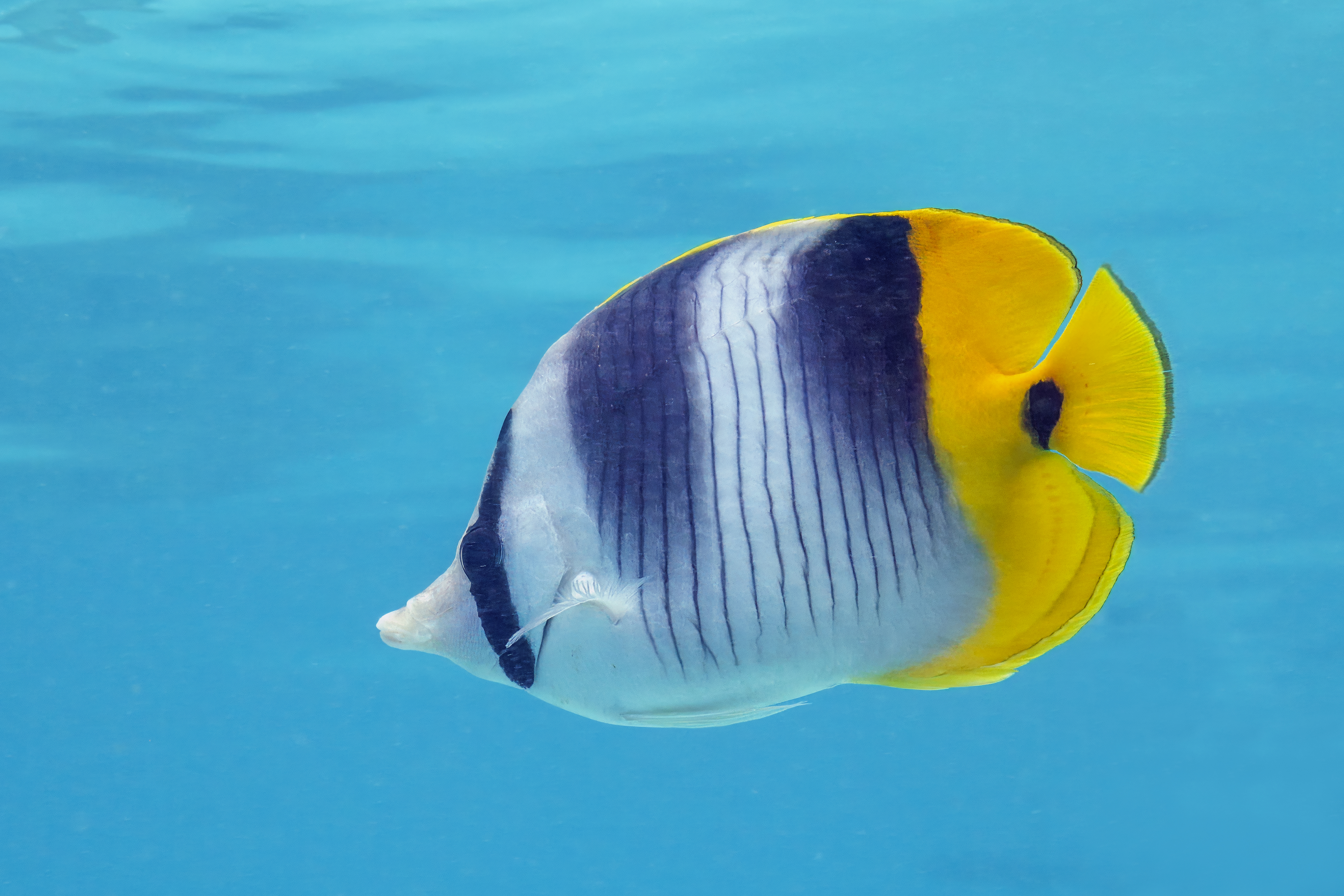

Conservation status
- Least Concern (IUCN 3.1)

Scientific classification
- Kingdom: Animalia
- Phylum: Chordata
- Class: Actinopterygii
- Division: Teleostei
- Order: Acanthuriformes
- Family: Chaetodontidae
- Genus: Chaetodon
- Subgenus: Chaetodon (Rabdophorus)
- Species: C. ulietensis

Binomial name
- Chaetodon ulietensis G. Cuvier, 1831

Synonyms
- Rabdophorus oxychaetodon ulietensis (Cuvier, 1831); Chaetodon aurora De Vis, 1884; Chaetodon ulietensis confluens Ahl, 1923

= Chaetodon ulietensis =

Species of fish

Chaetodon ulietensis, the Pacific double-saddle butterflyfish or false falcula butterflyfish, is a species of butterflyfish (family Chaetodontidae). It flourishes in coral-rich environments in the central Indo-Pacific region. Their range extends from the Cocos-Keeling Islands to the Tuamotu Islands, and north to Japan. They are usually found from the surface to 20 m depths, and like shallow channels with high current.

== Description and systematics ==
These fish can reach a size of 15 cm (5.9 in). They are white with vertical thin black lines down the body and two dark saddles on the fore and hind back, which softly grade into the background colour caudal gradient. Immediately after the hind quarter saddle, the body and tail is bright yellow with a black spot on the caudal peduncle. The dorsal fin has a streak of yellow from the crown of the head to the tail. Like most of its relatives, this species displays a black eye band like a mask. As in most butterflyfish, the Pacific double-saddle butterflyfish is prone to blanching at night and when startled.

C. ulietensis belongs to the large subgenus Rabdophorus, which might warrant recognition as a distinct genus. In this group, it is sister to the similar-looking black-wedged butterflyfish, C. falcula. Other fairly close relatives are the quite differently-shaped but similarly-coloured lined (C. lineolatus) and spot-naped butterflyfishes (C. oxycephalus), while the blue-cheeked butterflyfish (C. semilarvatus) is the sister species to all of these. Vertical lines are present in all of these species, while a white body with yellow behind and black on back and caudal peduncle are shared by all but C. semilarvatus.

== Ecology ==
Chaetodon ulietensis is often found singly or in pairs on coral-rich reef systems, foraging on sessile invertebrates and algae. It is not a territorial species that freely grazes throughout a wide range within reefs, lagoons and harbors, and every now and then large groups congregate at rich feeding spots. It is rarely ever observed in a deep reef environment or the open sea; juveniles are typically reared in shallow lagoons, estuaries or harbors.

An opportunistic omnivore, diet consists mainly of microscopic algae, other plankton, and small sessile invertebrates. As a measure of defense, they typically wedge themselves in tight crevasses to escape predators.

== In the aquarium ==
Although common in the wild, it is rarely imported by the aquarium trade. In aquarist terms, it is considered a hardy Chaetodon and beneficial for the control of nuisance pests. The Pacific double-saddle butterflyfish has been observed as a beneficial predator of Aiptasia and Majano sea anemones. Like most raccoon butterflyfish (C. lunula), C. ulietensis will eliminate this nuisance within a 2- to 6-week period depending on the anemone population and size of the tank. And unlike most raccoon butterflyfish, this species rarely feeds on ornamental corals. The Pacific double-saddle butterflyfish readily accepts most prepared frozen and dry foods, thus it can easily make the transition to aquarium life, unlike the copperband butterflyfish (Chelmon rostratus) or other less hardy Chaetodon species.
