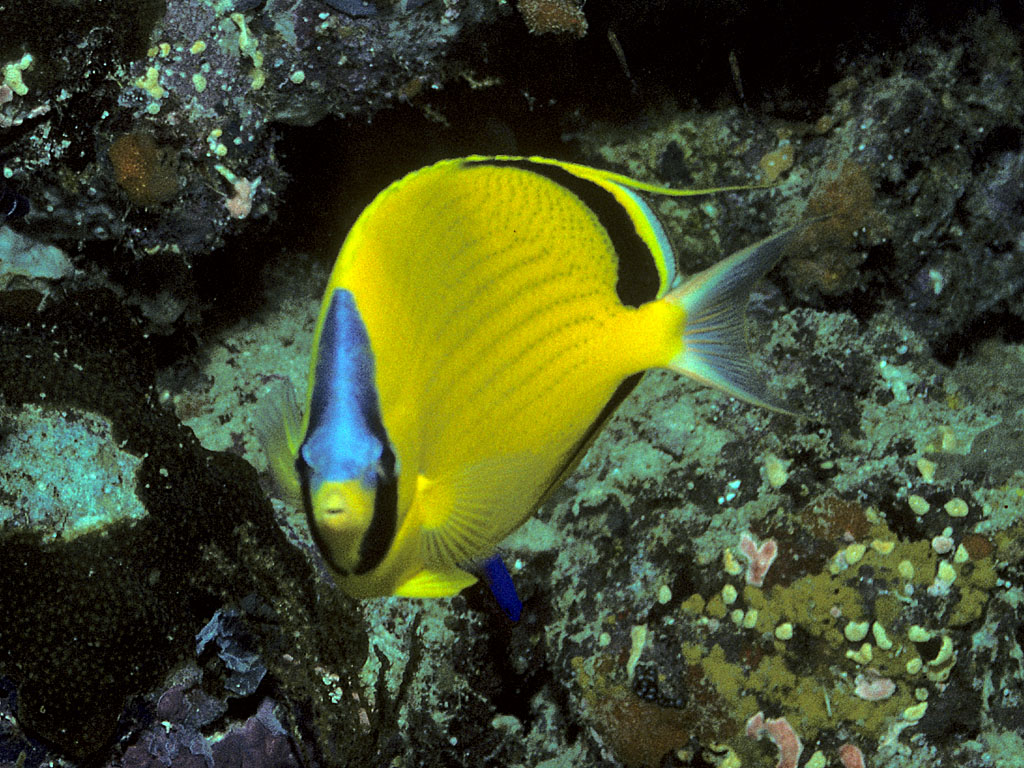

Conservation status
- Least Concern (IUCN 3.1)

Scientific classification
- Kingdom: Animalia
- Phylum: Chordata
- Class: Actinopterygii
- Division: Teleostei
- Order: Acanthuriformes
- Family: Chaetodontidae
- Genus: Chaetodon
- Subgenus: Chaetodon (Rabdophorus)
- Species: C. semeion

Binomial name
- Chaetodon semeion Bleeker, 1855

Synonyms
- Chaetodon decoratus Ahl, 1923

= Dotted butterflyfish =

Species of fish

The dotted butterflyfish (Chaetodon semeion) is a species of marine ray-finned fish. a butterflyfish belonging to the family Chaetodontidae. It is found in the Indian Ocean and Pacific Ocean.

== Description ==
The dotted butterflyfish is a bright golden yellow colour with a vertical, teardrop shaped bar running through the eye. It has a blue forehead and there are slightly oblique rows of black spots along their flanks. The dorsal, anal, pectoral and pelvic fins are yellow, with the bases of the dorsal and anal fins coloured black, and a filament growing out of the soft rayed part of the dorsal fin. Females have a notably thickened abdominal region. This species has 13–14 spines and 23–26 soft rays in its dorsal fin, while the anal fin has 3 spines and 19–22 soft rays. They attain a maximum total length of 26 centimetres (10 in).

== Distribution ==
The dotted butterflyfish is found in the Indian Ocean and Pacific Ocean from the Maldives to the Tuamotu Islands, north to the Ryukyu Islands and south to the Great Barrier Reef.

== Habitat and biology ==
The dotted butterflyfish is found at depths between 2 and 30 metres (6.6 and 98.4 ft). It is an uncommon species which occurs in coral rich areas of clear water such as lagoons and semi-protected seaward reefs, it is usually found in pairs or small groups and more wary than most species of Chaetodon. They are an oviparous species. This species feeds on tunicates and other ascidians, and a variety of benthic invertebrates.

== Systematics ==
The dotted butterflyfish was first formally described in 1855 by the Dutch physician, ichthyologist and herpetologist Pieter Bleeker (1819–1878) with the type locality being given as Cocos (Keeling) Islands, an Australian Indian Ocean territory. The specific name semeion means "banner" and is thought to be a reference to the long dorsal fin filament. This species belongs to the large subgenus Rabdophorus which might warrant recognition as a distinct genus. In this group, it appears to represent a distinct lineage, with the saddle butterflyfish (C. ephippium) perhaps the only somewhat closely related species. Next closest seems to be a group including the blackback butterflyfish (C. melannotus), spot-tailed butterflyfish (C. ocellicaudus) and yellow-dotted butterflyfish (C. selene), but these are already so distant that their ancestors must have diverged from the saddle butterflyfish's soon after the Rabdophorus lineage started to diversify.
