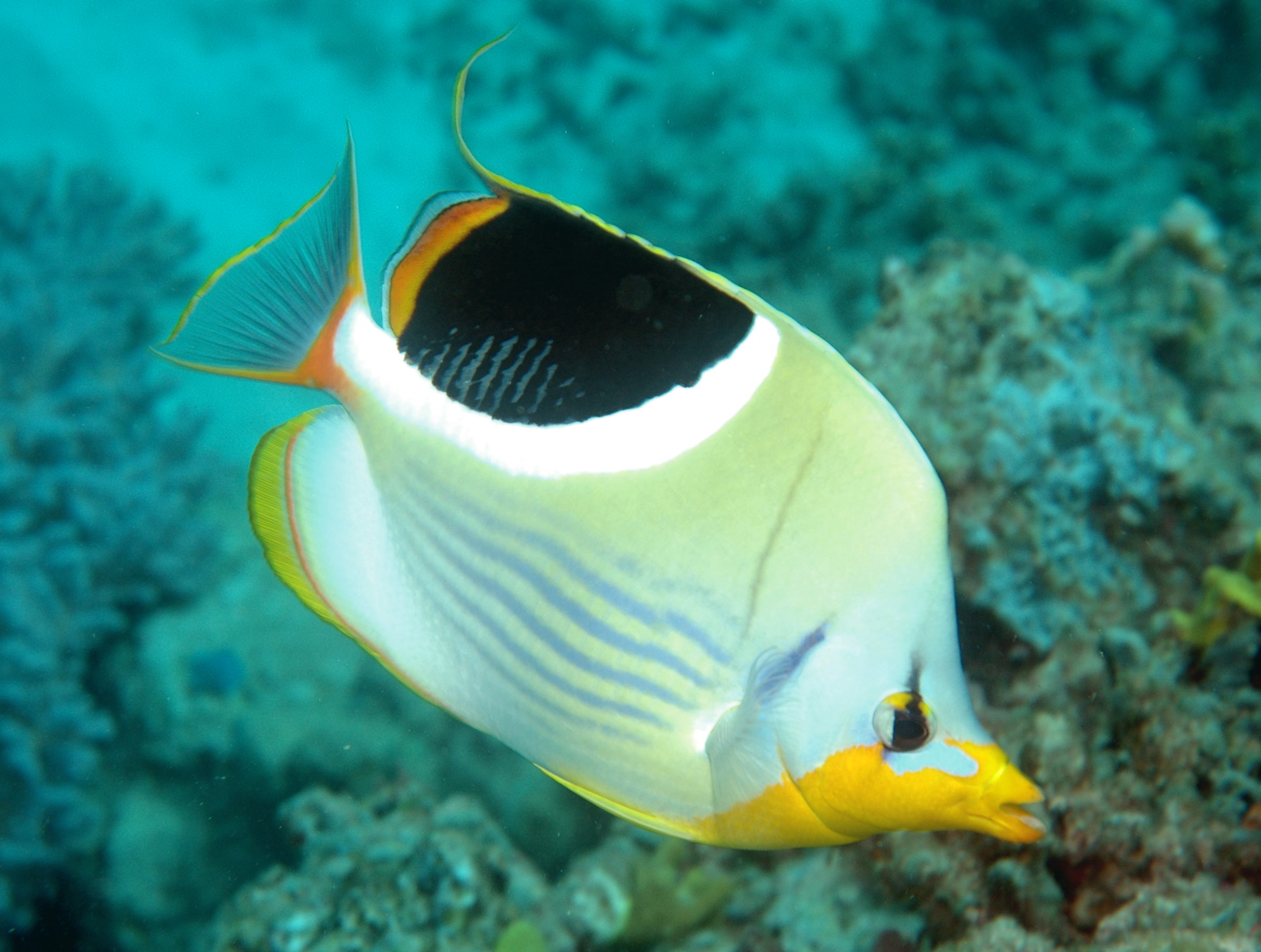
- Adult

Conservation status
- Least Concern (IUCN 3.1)

Scientific classification
- Kingdom: Animalia
- Phylum: Chordata
- Class: Actinopterygii
- Division: Teleostei
- Order: Acanthuriformes
- Family: Chaetodontidae
- Genus: Chaetodon
- Subgenus: Chaetodon (Rabdophorus)
- Species: C. ephippium

Binomial name
- Chaetodon ephippium G. Cuvier, 1831
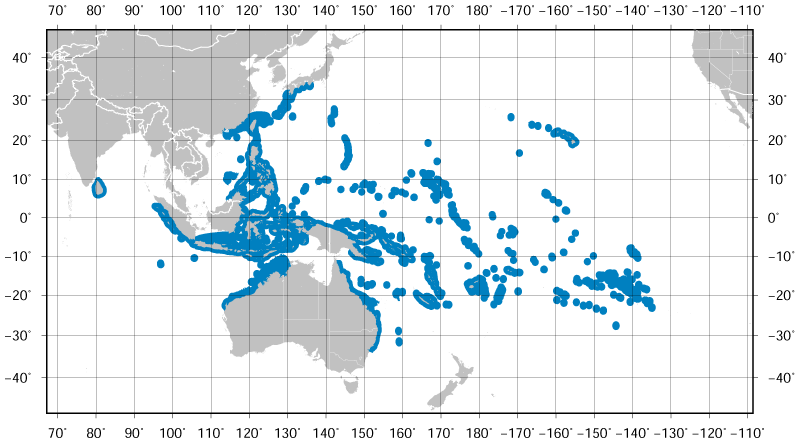
- Saddle butterflyfish range.

Synonyms
- Rabdophorus rabdophorus ephippium (Cuvier, 1831); Chaetodon principalis Cuvier, 1829; Chaetodon garnoti Lesson, 1831; Chaetodon mulsanti Thiollière, 1857

= Saddle butterflyfish =

Species of fish

The saddle butterflyfish (Chaetodon ephippium) is a species of marine ray-finned fish, a butterflyfish belonging to the family Chaetodontidae. It is found in the Indian and Pacific Oceans from Sri Lanka and the Cocos-Keeling Islands to the Hawaiian, Marquesan and Tuamotu islands, north to southern Japan, south to Rowley Shoals and New South Wales in Australia.

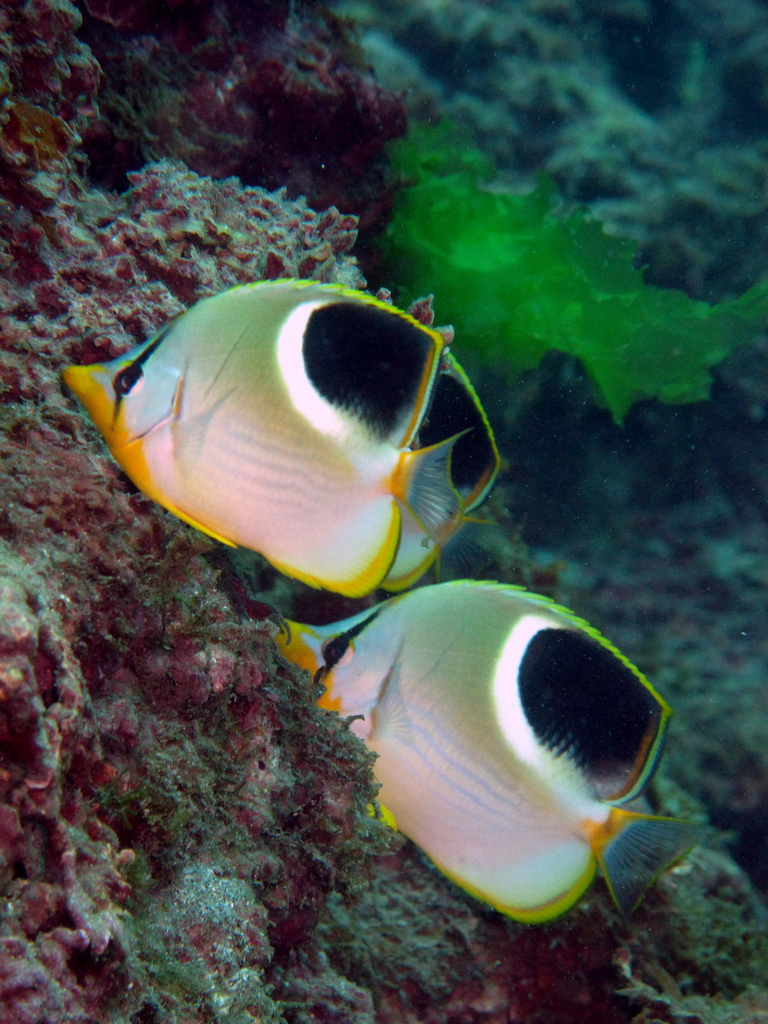
A pair of saddle butterflyfish found in the coral reef of nearshore water of Northeast Coast, Taiwan

It is a large butterflyfish, at up to 30 cm (nearly 12 in) long together with the lined butterflyfish (C. lineolatus) the giant among its genus. In shape it resembles certain angelfishes more than most of its relatives. The overall color is yellowish grey, with a large black spot bordered below by a broad white band on the back and wavy blue lines on the lower sides. The throat and the outline of the hind parts is bright yellow. Adults have a filament extending posteriorly from the upper part of the soft portion of the dorsal fin.

The saddle butterflyfish is found at depths between 0 and 30 m in coral reefs. It feeds on filamentous algae, small invertebrates, coral polyps, and fish eggs.

The saddle butterflyfish was first formally described in 1831 by the French anatomist Georges Cuvier (1769–1832), the type locality was given as Bora Bora in the Society Islands, part of French Polynesia. It belongs to the large subgenus Rabdophorus which might warrant recognition as a distinct genus. In this group, it appears to represent a distinct lineage, with the dotted butterflyfish (C. semeion) perhaps the only somewhat closely related species. Next closest seems to be a group including the blackback butterflyfish (C. melannotus), spot-tailed butterflyfish (C. ocellicaudus) and yellow-dotted butterflyfish (C. selene), but these are already so distant that their ancestors must have diverged from the saddle butterflyfish's soon after the Rabdophorus lineage started to diversify.
