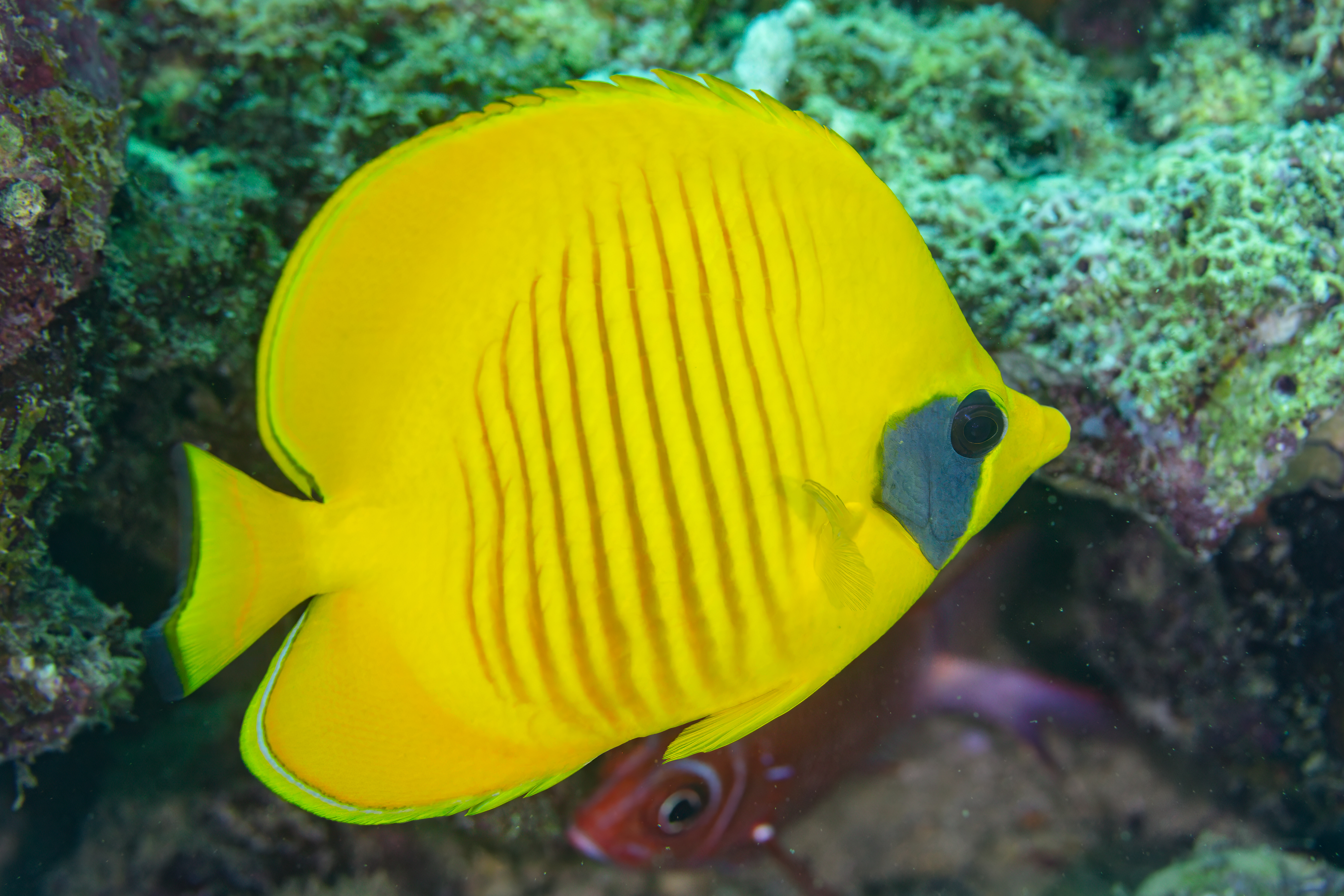

Conservation status
- Least Concern (IUCN 3.1)

Scientific classification
- Kingdom: Animalia
- Phylum: Chordata
- Class: Actinopterygii
- Order: Acanthuriformes
- Family: Chaetodontidae
- Genus: Chaetodon
- Subgenus: Chaetodon (Rabdophorus)
- Species: C. semilarvatus

Binomial name
- Chaetodon semilarvatus G. Cuvier, 1831

Synonyms
- Chaetodon melanopoma Playfair, 1867

= Bluecheek butterflyfish =

Species of fish

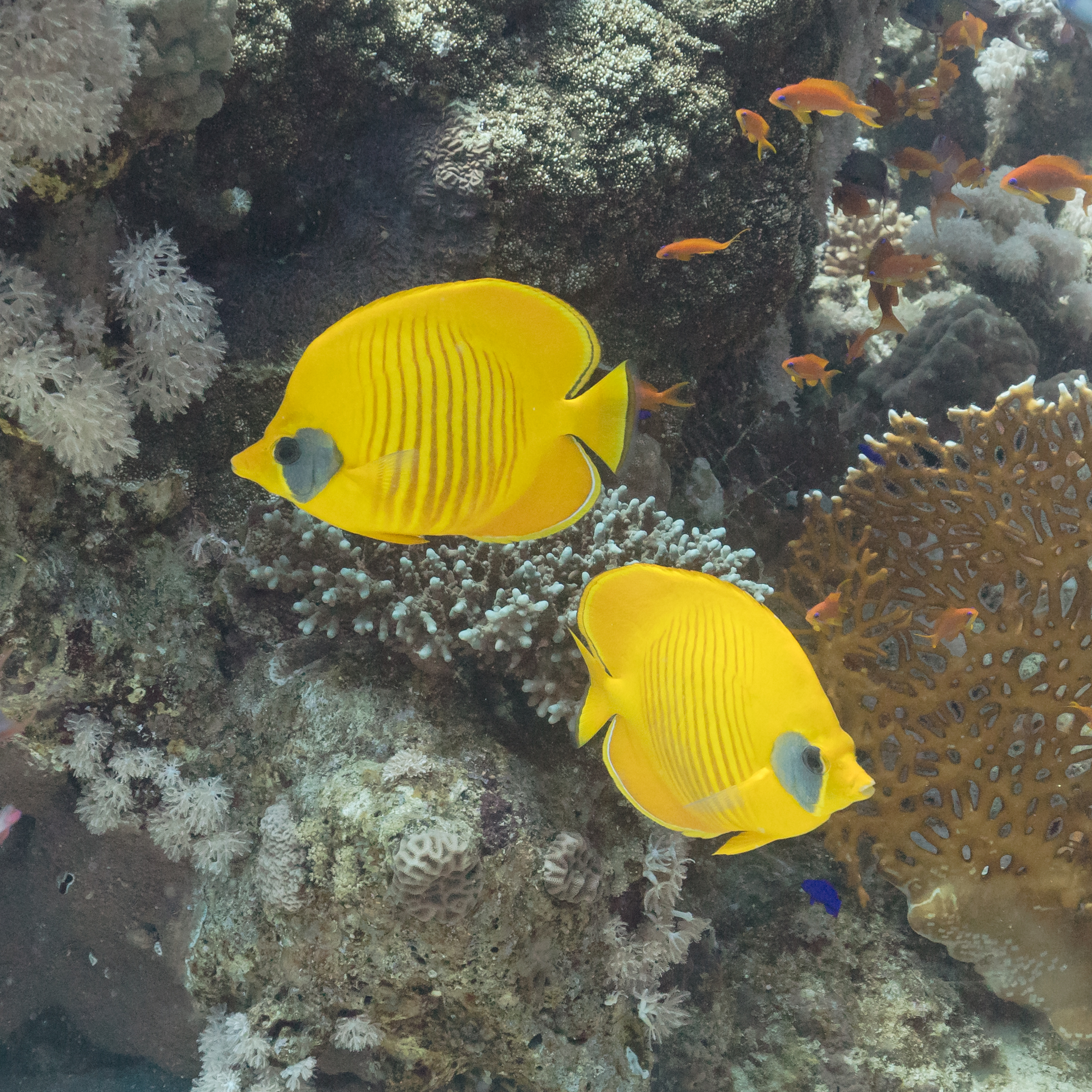
Couple in the Red Sea

The blue-cheeked butterflyfish (Chaetodon semilarvatus) is a marine species of ray-finned fish, a butterflyfish belonging to the family Chaetodontidae. It is found in the north-western Indian Ocean.

== Description ==
The bluecheek butterflyfish has a bright yellow body marked with thin vertical red lines. There a greyish patch behind the eyes, whereas most related species have an eye bar. The dorsal, anal, pelvic and caudal fins are yellow. It is a relatively large species of butterflyfish which can attain a maximum total length of 23 centimetres (9.1 in), although 15 centimetres (5.9 in) is more typical.

== Distribution ==
The bluecheek butterflyfish is found in the north-western Indian Ocean where it occurs in the Red Sea and the Gulf of Aden, as far east as the coast of Oman.

== Habitat and biology ==
The bluecheek butterflyfish is one of the few fish species to have long-term mates. In the wild, the fish eats hard corals as well as benthic invertebrates. This is a common species which is found in areas with rich coral growth. They are frequently recorded in pairs or in small shoals. They have been known to occasionally hover in a stationary position for long periods beneath ledges of plate corals of the genus Acropora. It is oviparous species which forms pairs when spawning. This is normally during the day and the fishes emerge and are active at night. They are found at depths between 1 and 20 metres (3.3 and 65.6 ft).

== Systematics ==
The bluecheek butterflyfish was first formally described in 1831 by the French anatomist Georges Cuvier with the type locality given as the Red Sea at Massawa, Eritrea and Al-Luhayya, Yemen. It belongs to the large subgenus Rabdophorus which might warrant recognition as a distinct genus. In this group, it seems closest to a group containing the blackback butterflyfish (C. melannotus), the spot-naped butterflyfish (C. oxycephalus), or the peculiar black-wedged butterflyfish (C. falcula) and Pacific double-saddle butterflyfish or "false falcula", (C. ulietensis). Though the present species does not share their white body with black on the back and caudal peduncle and even lacks the typical eyestripe of Chaetodon, it has the same tell-tale blue vertical lines as these species.
