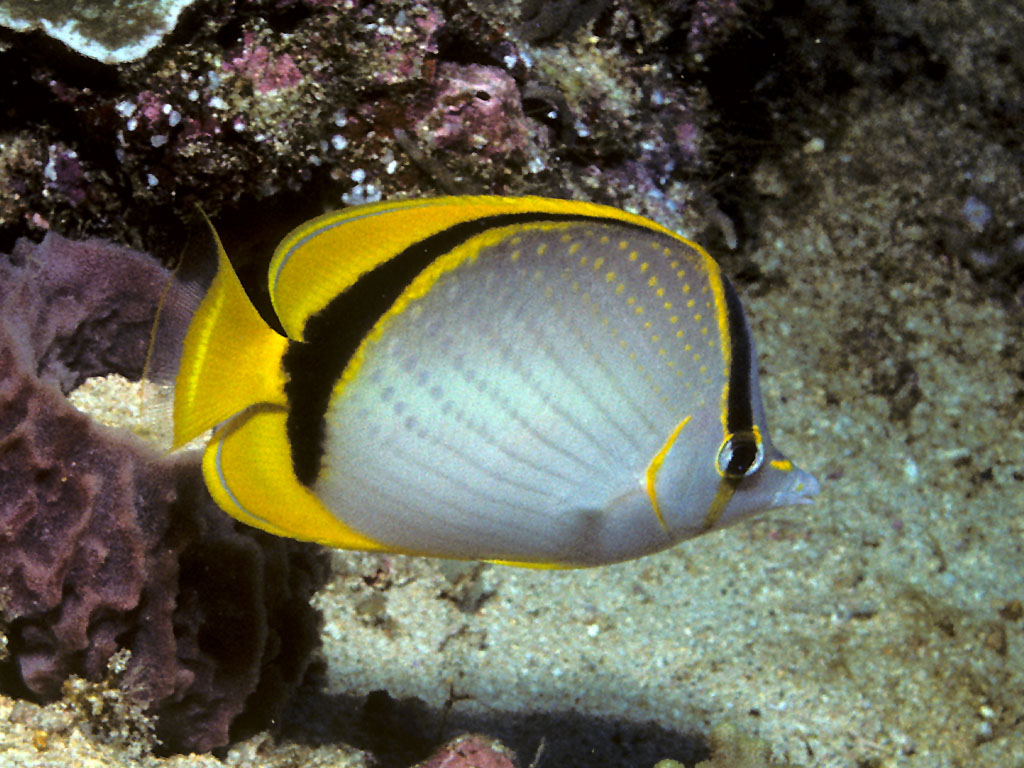

Conservation status
- Least Concern (IUCN 3.1)

Scientific classification
- Kingdom: Animalia
- Phylum: Chordata
- Class: Actinopterygii
- Division: Teleostei
- Order: Acanthuriformes
- Family: Chaetodontidae
- Genus: Chaetodon
- Subgenus: Chaetodon (Rabdophorus)
- Species: C. selene

Binomial name
- Chaetodon selene Bleeker, 1853

= Yellow-dotted butterflyfish =

Species of fish

The yellow-dotted butterflyfish (Chaetodon selene) is a poorly known marine ray-finned fish species, a butterflyfish belonging to the family Chaetodontidae. It is found in the Indi-Western Pacific Region.

== Description ==
The yellow-dotted butterflyfish has a whitish body which is marked with diagonal lines of greyish spots. There is a vertical black band with yellow edges which runs through the eye and another vertical black band which runs from the dorsal fin, over the caudal peduncle and onto the anal fin. The dorsal, anal and anterior part of the caudal fin are yellow. The black bars are more obvious in juveniles but as they mature they fade and the underlying yellow colouration becomes more obvious and changing the apparent colour of the bands to brownish. The rear vertical band also grows longer with age and runs parallel to the base of the dorsal fin towards the eye band, nearly reaching it. It has 12 spines and 20–22 soft rays in its dorsal fin while the anal fin contains 3 spines and 18–19 soft rays. This small butterflyfish attains a maximum total length of 16 centimetres (6.3 in).

== Distribution ==
The yellow-dotted butterflyfish is found throughout the Indo-Malayan region from northern Java eastwards to the north coast of Papua New Guinea and northwards to Taiwan and on to the Ryukyu Islands and Kashiwa-jima in southern Japan.

== Habitat and biology ==
The yellow-dotted butterflyfish is found on coastal reefs, primarily on rubble slopes from 8–50 metres (26–164 ft) in depth. They are normally encountered in pairs, however, juveniles are found solitarily near coral outcrops while the adults prefer rubble or sandy bottoms. They feed on tunicates, sea squirts and a variety of other benthic invertebrates, as well as small quantities of algae. They will also eat coral polyps.

== Systematics ==
The yellow-dotted butterflyfish was first formally described in 1853 by the Dutch physician, ichthyologist and herpetologist Pieter Bleeker (1819–1878) with the type locality being given as Lawajong on Solor Island in Indonesia. The specific name selene means "moon" and although Bleeker did not explain its allusion it is thought to be a reference to the black crescent shaped band running from the back of the head to the anal fin. It belongs to the large subgenus Rabdophorus, which might warrant recognition as a distinct genus. In this group, it appears a somewhat distant relative of the blackback butterflyfish (C. melannotus) and the spot-tailed butterflyfish (C. ocellicaudus). They are all of oval shape, silvery with yellow fins and snout, ascending diagonal stripes (yellow in C. selene, dark in the others), and black markings around the eyes, on the caudal peduncle, and sometimes on the back. Next closest seem the saddle butterflyfish (C. ephippium) and the dotted butterflyfish (C. semeion), but these are already so distant that their ancestors are thought to have diverged from those soon after the Rabdophorus lineage started to diversify.
