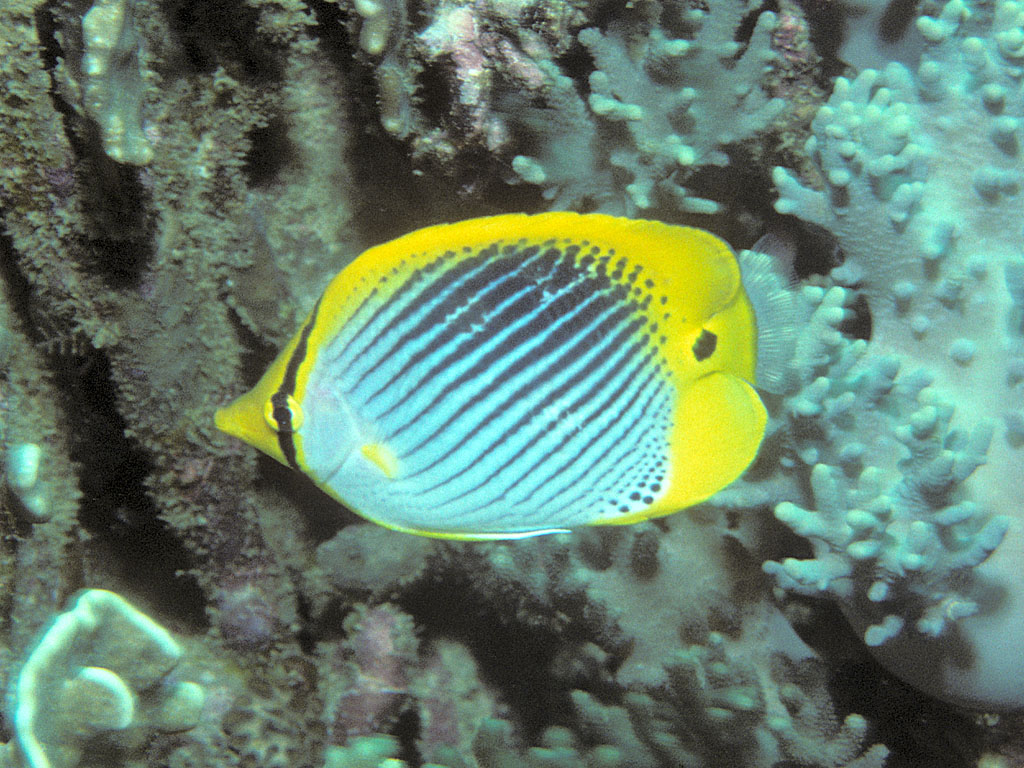

Conservation status
- Data Deficient (IUCN 3.1)

Scientific classification
- Kingdom: Animalia
- Phylum: Chordata
- Class: Actinopterygii
- Division: Teleostei
- Order: Acanthuriformes
- Family: Chaetodontidae
- Genus: Chaetodon
- Subgenus: Chaetodon (Rabdophorus)
- Species: C. ocellicaudus

Binomial name
- Chaetodon ocellicaudus G. Cuvier, 1831

= Spot-tail butterflyfish =

Species of fish

The spot-tailed butterflyfish, Chaetodon ocellicaudus, is a species of marine ray-finned fish, a butterflyfish belonging to the family Chaetodontidae. It is found in the central Indo-west Pacific region from Malaysia to New Guinea, north to the Philippines and Palau in Micronesia.

It grows to a maximum of 15 cm (5.9 in) long. Nearly identical to the black-backed butterflyfish (C. melannotus), it differs only in the shape of the black mark on the caudal peduncle, in lacking a black mark on the chest, a lighter back, and in having an average of 14 rather than 15 pectoral fin rays.

C. ocellicaudus belongs to the large subgenus Rabdophorus which might warrant recognition as a distinct genus. In this group, it appears to be a close relative of the black-backed butterflyfish and somewhat less close to the yellow-dotted butterflyfish (C. selene). These are all of oval shape, silvery with yellow fins and snout, ascending diagonal stripes, and black markings around the eyes, on the caudal peduncle, and sometimes on the back. Next closest seem the saddle butterflyfish (C. ephippium) and the dotted butterflyfish (C. semeion), but these are already so distant that their ancestors must have diverged from those soon after the Rabdophorus lineage started to diversify.

The spot-tailed butterflyfish is found at depths between 3 and 15 m in coral reefs. They occur in coral-rich areas of reef flats, lagoons and seaward reefs. Juveniles tend to keep inshore. Adults are usually seen in pairs. These fish feed on soft coral polyps (e.g. Litophyton viridis and species of the genera Clavularia, Nephthia and Sarcophyton).
