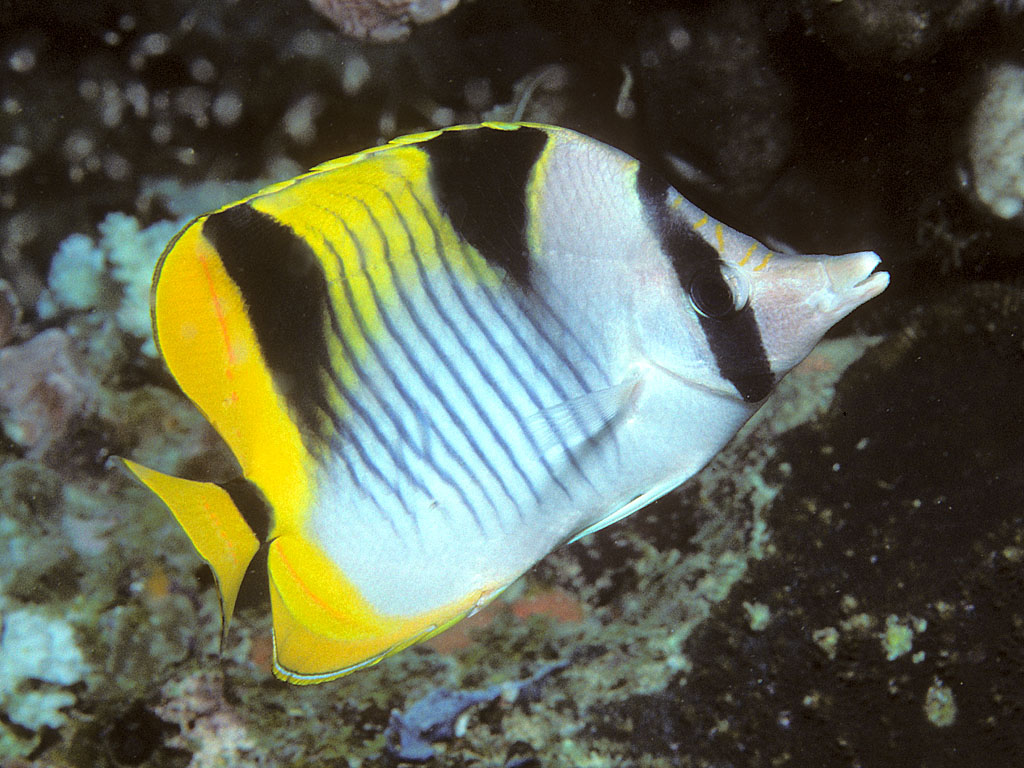

Conservation status
- Least Concern (IUCN 3.1)

Scientific classification
- Kingdom: Animalia
- Phylum: Chordata
- Class: Actinopterygii
- Order: Acanthuriformes
- Family: Chaetodontidae
- Genus: Chaetodon
- Subgenus: Chaetodon (Rabdophorus)
- Species: C. falcula

Binomial name
- Chaetodon falcula Bloch, 1795

Synonyms
- Anisochaetodon falcula (Bloch, 1795); Chaetodon dizoster Valenciennes, 1831; Tetragonoptrus dizoster (Valenciennes, 1831)

= Chaetodon falcula =

Species of fish

Chaetodon falcula, the blackwedged butterflyfish or falcula butterflyfish, is a species of marine ray-finned fish a butterflyfish belonging to the family Chaetodontidae. It is found in the Indian Ocean.

== Description ==
Chaetodon falcula has a white body which is marked with a number of thin vertical dark grey lines. It has two clear black saddle-like blotches on the dorsal part of the body, a vertical black eye band and a black caudal peduncle. The dorsal, anal and caudal fins are yellow. The yellow continues onto the body adjacent to the dorsal and anal fins. There are 12–13 spines in the dorsal fin and 23–25 soft rays while the anal fin contains 3 spines and 20–21 soft rays. This species attains a total length of 20 centimetres (7.9 in).

== Distribution ==
Chaetodon falcula is found in the Indian Ocean where it occurs along the East African coast between Kenya and South Africa, Madagascar and the other western and central islands of the Indian Ocean, Sri Lanka, southern India, including the Andaman and Nicobar Islands, and from the waters of western Thailand east as far as Java. It occurs in the Cocos (Keeling) Islands, which are part of Australia, too.

== Habitat and biology ==
Chaetodon falcula is found at depths of 1 to 15 metres (3.3 to 49.2 ft). They are found on the reef edge and upper slope normally in habitats subjected to strong currents although the juveniles hide among corals. Typically seen in pairs or small aggregations, of up to 20 fish. Their diet is made up of feeds of the polyps, worms, sea anemones, crustaceans, sponges, the feet of sea urchin and other invertebrates. This species forms distinct pairs to breed and the pelagic eggs are scattered in open water.

== Systematics ==
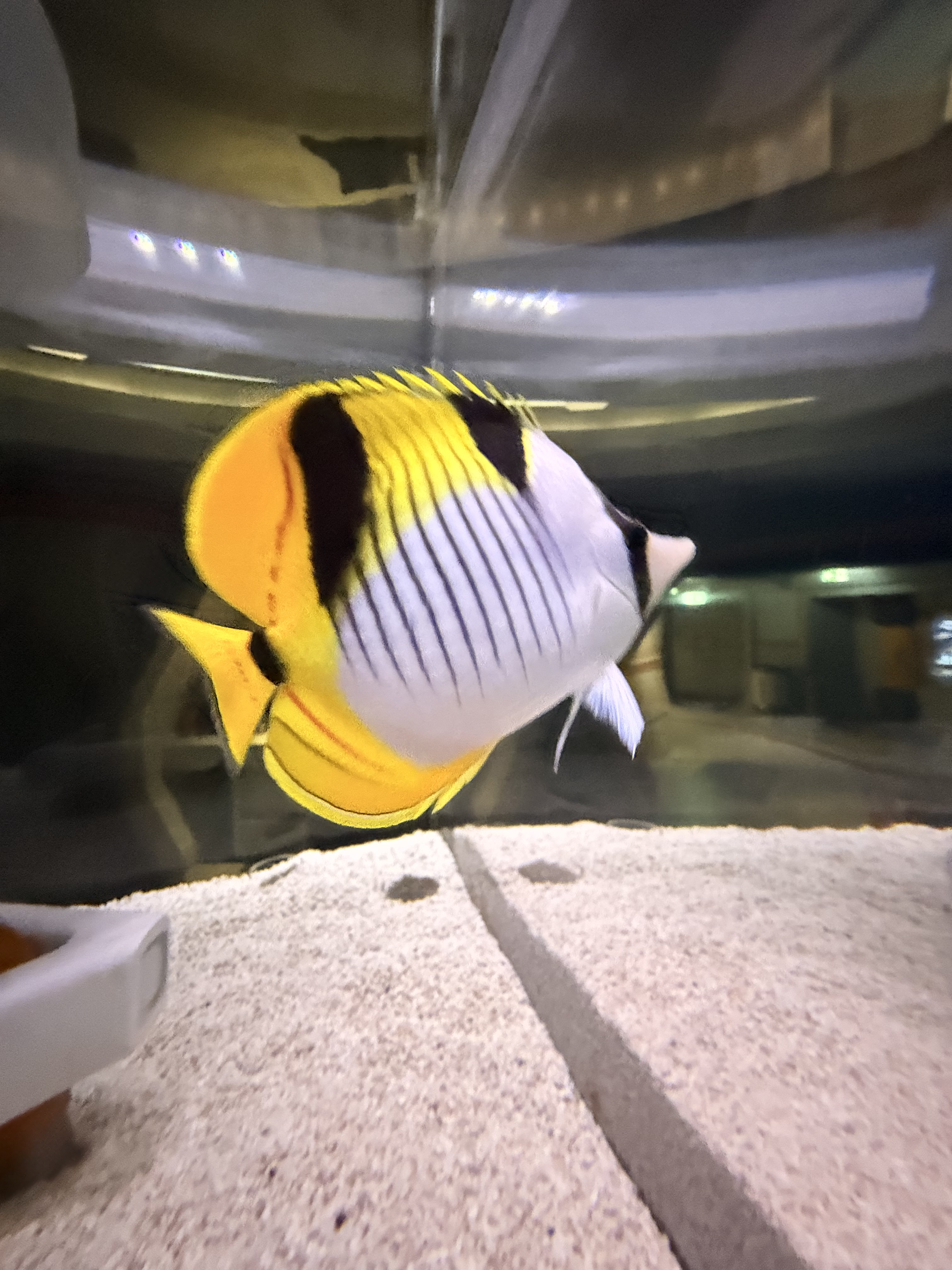
Blackwedged Butterflyfish in a tank

Chaetodon falcula was first formally described in 1795 by the German physician and naturalist Marcus Elieser Bloch (1723–1797) with the type locality given as Tharangambadi in India. The specific name falcula is a diminutive of the Latin falx or falcis meaning a "sickle" or a "scythe" and is a reference to the wedge shaped black saddle blotches which Bloch illustrated as sickle-shaped, which they are not in modern photographs.

With its sister species, the similar-looking Pacific double-saddle butterflyfish (C. ulietensis), C. falcula belongs to the large subgenus Rabdophorus which might warrant recognition as a distinct genus. Other fairly close relatives are the quite differently-shaped but similarly-coloured lined (C. lineolatus) and spot-naped butterflyfishes (C. oxycephalus), while the blue-cheeked butterflyfish (C. semilarvatus) is the sister species to all of these. Vertical lines are present in all of these species, while a white body with yellow behind and black on back and caudal peduncle are shared by all but C. semilarvatus.
