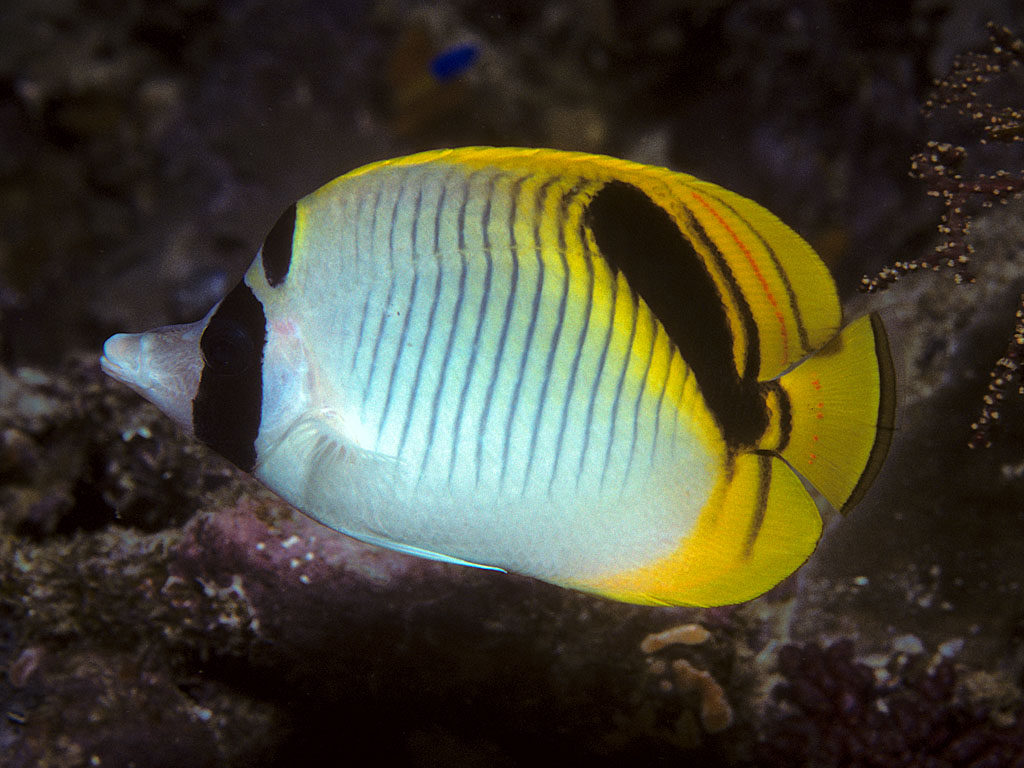

Conservation status
- Least Concern (IUCN 3.1)

Scientific classification
- Kingdom: Animalia
- Phylum: Chordata
- Class: Actinopterygii
- Order: Acanthuriformes
- Family: Chaetodontidae
- Genus: Chaetodon
- Subgenus: Chaetodon (Rabdophorus)
- Species: C. oxycephalus

Binomial name
- Chaetodon oxycephalus Bleeker, 1853

= Spot-nape butterflyfish =

Species of fish

The spot-nape butterflyfish (Chaetodon oxycephalus), also known as the pig-face butterflyfish, is a species of marine ray-finned fish in the butterflyfish family Chaetodontidae.

== Etymology ==
The specific name of the spot-nape butterflyfish is formed by combining oxy, meaning "sharp" (the oxy part of "oxygen" is also taken from here), and cephalus, meaning "head". Bleeker used this term to refer to the pointed profile of the projecting snout of this species.

== Taxonomy ==
Within its genus, the spot-nape butterflyfish belongs to the large subgenus Rabdophorus, which might warrant recognition as a distinct genus. Molecular phylogenetic studies indicate that, in this group, this butterflyfish belongs to a clade also containing the black-wedged vutterflyfish (C. falcula), the Pacific double-saddle butterflyfish (C. ulietensis), the lined butterflyfish (C. lineolatus) and the blue-cheeked butterflyfish (C. semilarvatus). However, there is not yet a consensus regarding the internal relationships among these species.

== Description ==
The flanks of the spot-nape butterflyfish are mostly white, overlaid with thin vertical lines. There is a large yellow-margined black area on the upper back, which touches the dorsal, anal and caudal fins. All these fins are mostly yellow, but there are some black and orange lines and spots on them as well. There is also a vertical black eyestripe, which is interrupted above the eyes. The closely related lined butterflyfish has a very similar appearance, but there are still noticeable differences, as the latter lacks the black and orange elements in the fins and has an uninterrupted black eyestripe.

== Distribution and habitat ==
The spot-nape butterflyfish is found in the Indo-West Pacific region, from Sri Lanka in the west to Queensland in the south and Indonesia and the Philippines in the north. It occurs in coral-rich areas and clear waters of seaward reefs at depths of 10–40 m (33–131 ft).

== Diet ==
The spot-nape butterflyfish feeds on coral polyps and sea anemones.
