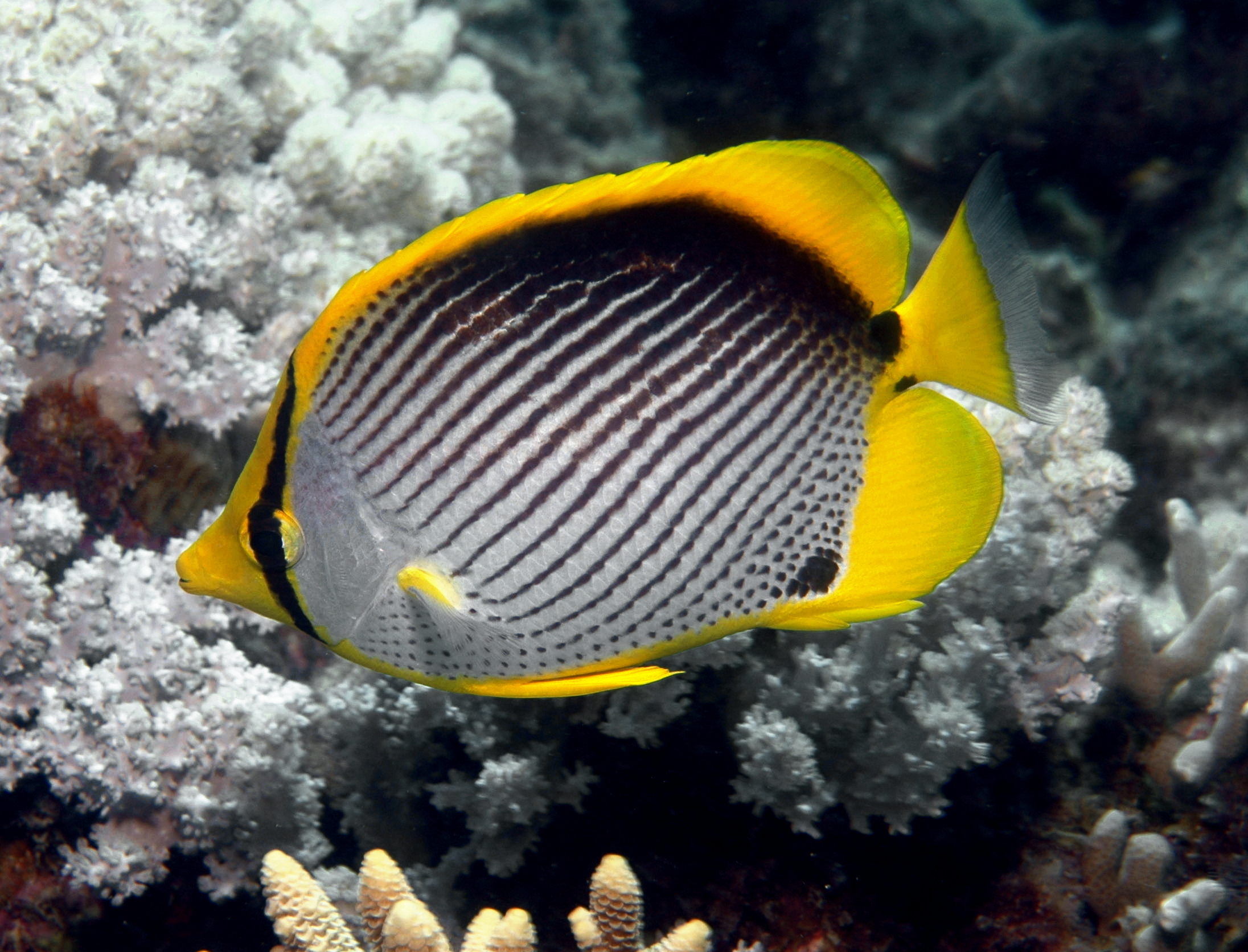

Conservation status
- Least Concern (IUCN 3.1)

Scientific classification
- Kingdom: Animalia
- Phylum: Chordata
- Class: Actinopterygii
- Order: Acanthuriformes
- Family: Chaetodontidae
- Genus: Chaetodon
- Subgenus: Chaetodon (Rabdophorus)
- Species: C. melannotus

Binomial name
- Chaetodon melannotus Bloch & Schneider, 1801

Synonyms
- Mesochaetodon strongylochaetodon melannotus (Bloch & Schneider, 1801); Chaetodon dorsalis Rüppell, 1829; Tetragonoptrus dorsalis (Rüppell, 1829); Chaetodon melanotus Cuvier, 1831; Chaetodon marginatus Cuvier, 1831; Chaetodon abhortani Cuvier, 1831; Chaetodon reinwardtii Günther, 1860

= Blackback butterflyfish =

Species of fish

The black-backed butterflyfish or blackback butterflyfish (Chaetodon melannotus) is a species of ray-finned fish in the butterflyfish family Chaetodontidae. It is widespread through the Indo-Pacific, ranging from the Red Sea and East Africa to southern Japan, Micronesia and Samoa.

== Taxonomy ==
With its genus, the blackback butterflyfish belongs to the large subgenus Rabdophorus, which might warrant recognition as a distinct genus. In this group, it appears to be a close relative of the spot-tailed butterflyfish (C. ocellicaudus), and it is somewhat less close to the yellow-dotted butterflyfish (C. selene). These are all of oval shape, have silvery coloration with yellow fins and snout, and have ascending diagonal stripes and black markings around the eyes, on the caudal peduncle and sometimes on the back. The saddle butterflyfish (C. ephippium) and the dotted butterflyfish (C. semeion) also seem related, but these are already so distant that their ancestors must have diverged soon after the Rabdophorus lineage started to diversify.

== Description ==
The blackback butterflyfish grows up to 18 cm (7.1 in) in length, and may live for up to 20 years. Normally, the coloration of this fish is as in the image on the right; however, when observed at night or frightened, it can change color. As a result, the dorsal portion of the body turns black, except for two white patches.

== Biology ==
Like most other species of butterflyfish, the blackback butterflyfish inhabits reefs. It is common on staghorn coral thickets, and is less seen on exposed parts of reefs. It is generally found at a depth of 4–20 m (13–66 ft), usually solitarily. This changes during the breeding season, when pairs are more common. Juveniles are more commonly found inshore, in pairs or traveling in small groups. This butterflyfish feeds primarily on the polyps of soft and hard corals.

== Human interactions ==
The blackback butterflyfish can be found in the aquarium trade, and is easy to maintain in the aquarium by the standards of its genus.
