= List of animals named after other animals =

Many animals are referred to by common names in casual speech. In some cases, these common names include another animal name, such as in spider monkey, tiger shark, or mantis shrimp. This common name grouping may refer to a single species, as with tiger shark, or to an entire taxonomic order, as with mantis shrimp. The following is an incomplete list of common names of animals named after other animals, regardless of taxonomic level.

== Birds ==
- Antbird
  - Antshrike
  - Antwren
- Anteater chat
- Antpitta
- Ant tanager
- Antthrush
- Antvireo
- Bat falcon
- Bat hawk
- Bee-eater
- Bee hummingbird
- Bullfinch
- Catbird
- Cicadabird
- Cowbird
- Crab-plover
- Cuckoo-dove
- Cuckoo-hawk
- Cuckooshrike
- Curlew sandpiper
- Eagle-owl
- Emutail
- Fish crow
- Fish eagle
- Fish hawk
- Fish owl
- Flycatcher
- Fox kestrel
- Fox sparrow
- Frogmouth
- Gnateater
- Grasshopper sparrow
- Grasshopper warbler
- Harrier-hawk
- Herring gull
- Magpie-lark
- Monarch flycatcher
- Oxpecker
- Oystercatcher
- Parrot-billed seedeater
- Parrot-billed sparrow
- Parrot crossbill
- Parrotfinch
- Peacock-pheasant
- Quailfinch
- Quail-plover
- Shrikelike tanager
- Shriketit
- Snakebird
- Snake eagle
- Sparrowhawk
- Sparrow-lark
- Spiderhunter
- Swamphen
- Thrush nightingale
- Tiger heron
- Tiger parrot
- Tiger shrike
- Turkey vulture
- Turtle dove
- Zebra dove
- Zebra finch
- Zebra woodpecker

== Fish ==
List of fish named after animals:

- Alligator gar
- Alligatorfish
- Anemonefish
- Avocet snipe eel
- Bird wrasse
- Boarfish
- Bat ray
- Buffalofish
- Bull shark
- Bull trout
- Butterflyfish
- Butterfly ray
- Carpsucker
- Catfish
- Cockfish
- Cod icefish
- Coral catshark
- Crocodile icefish
- Crocodile shark
- Crocodile toothfish
- Cuckoo wrasse
- Cowfish
- Cow shark
- Dogfish shark
- Dolphinfish
- Eagle ray
- Earthworm eel
- Eel cod
- Flying fox
- Foxfish
- Freshwater elephantfish
- Frogfish
- Goatfish
- Goosefish
- Gopher rockfish
- Giant salmon carp
- Hawkfish
- Hogfish
- Hog sucker
- Horsefish
- Horse mackerel
- Houndshark
- Jaguar catshark
- Leopard blenny
- Leopard catshark
- Leopard dace
- Leopard darter
- Leopard eel
- Leopard flounder
- Leopard moray eel
- Leopard whipray
- Lionfish
- Lizardfish
- Loach goby
- Mackerel shark
- Mosquitofish
- Mussel blenny
- Panther grouper
- Parrotfish
- Peacock bass
- Pelican eel
- Penguinfish
- Pikeminnow
- Ponyfish
- Porcupinefish
- Porcupine ray
- Porcupine river stingray
- Rabbitfish
- Ratfish
- Red pigfish
- Roosterfish
- Salamanderfish
- Scorpionfish
- Sea butterfly
- Seahorse
- Seamoth
- Sea raven
- Sea robin
- Sea toad
- Sheepshead minnow
- Sheepshead porgy
- Shrimpfish
- Shrimp goby
- Snailfish
- Snake eel
- Snakehead fish
- Snake mackerel
- Spiderfish
- Squirrelfish
- Tiger barb
- Tigerfish
- Tigerperch
- Tiger shark
- Toadfish
- Turkeyfish
- Turkey moray
- Viperfish
- Waspfish
- Weasel shark
- Whale shark
- Wolf eel
- Wolffish
- Wolf herring
- Worm eel
- Wormfish
- Zebrafish
- Zebra loach
- Zebra shark
- Zebra tilapia

== Invertebrates ==
- Ant beetle
- Antlion
- Bee-fly
- Bird spider
- Blue-spotted crow (butterfly)
- Camel spider
- Camel treehopper
- Chameleon shrimp
- Chocolate albatross (butterfly)
- Common jay (butterfly)
- Crab spider
- Cuckoo bee
- Cuckoo wasp
- Deerfly
- Elephant beetle
- Giraffe weevil
- Fishfly
- Flea beetle
- Hawkmoth
- Horsefly
- Hummingbird hawk-moth
- Lanternfly
- Leopard slug
- Lynx spider
- Magpie moth
- Mantidfly
- Mantis shrimp
- Mole cricket
- Mosquito hawk
- Orange tiger (butterfly)
- Owlet moth
- Ox beetle
- Owlfly
- Peacock (butterfly)
- Peacock spider
- Rabbit beetle
- Rhinoceros beetle
- Scallop moth
- Scorpionfly
- Spider beetle
- Spider crab
- Spider mite
- Tarantula hawk wasp
- Tiger beetle
- Tiger moth
- Tiger shrimp
- Tiger swallowtail
- Tortoise beetle
- Wasp moth
- Wasp mantidfly
- Wolf spider
- Zebra jumping spider

== Mammals ==
- Anteater
- Bat-eared fox
- Bear cat
- Bear cuscus
- Crab-eating fox
- Crab-eating macaque
- Crab-eating mongoose
- Crab-eating raccoon
- Crab-eating rat
- Deer mouse
- Duck-billed platypus
- Elephant seal
- Elephant shrew
- Fish-eating bat
- Fish-eating rat
- Flying fox
- Fox squirrel
- Grasshopper mouse
- Guinea pig
- Hare-wallaby
- Kangaroo mouse
- Kangaroo rat
- Leopard seal
- Mole-rat
- Mouse bandicoot
- Mouse deer
- Mouse lemur
- Mouse opossum
- Otter shrew
- Prairie dog
- Rat-kangaroo
- Raccoon dog
- Red panda
- Right whale dolphin
- Sea lion
- Shrew mole
- Shrew opossum
- Skunk bear
- Sloth bear
- Spider monkey
- Squirrel glider
- †Tasmanian tiger
- Tiger quoll
- Woodlark cuscus

== Reptiles and amphibians ==
- Alligator lizard
- Alligator snapping turtle
- Bullfrog
- Crab-eating frog
- Crocodile newt
- Crocodile skink
- Coral snake
- Fox snake
- Leopard frog
- Leopard gecko
- Rat snake
- Seal salamander
- Tiger salamander
- Worm lizard
