= Khuk Khi Kai =

Former prison in Chanthaburi, Thailand

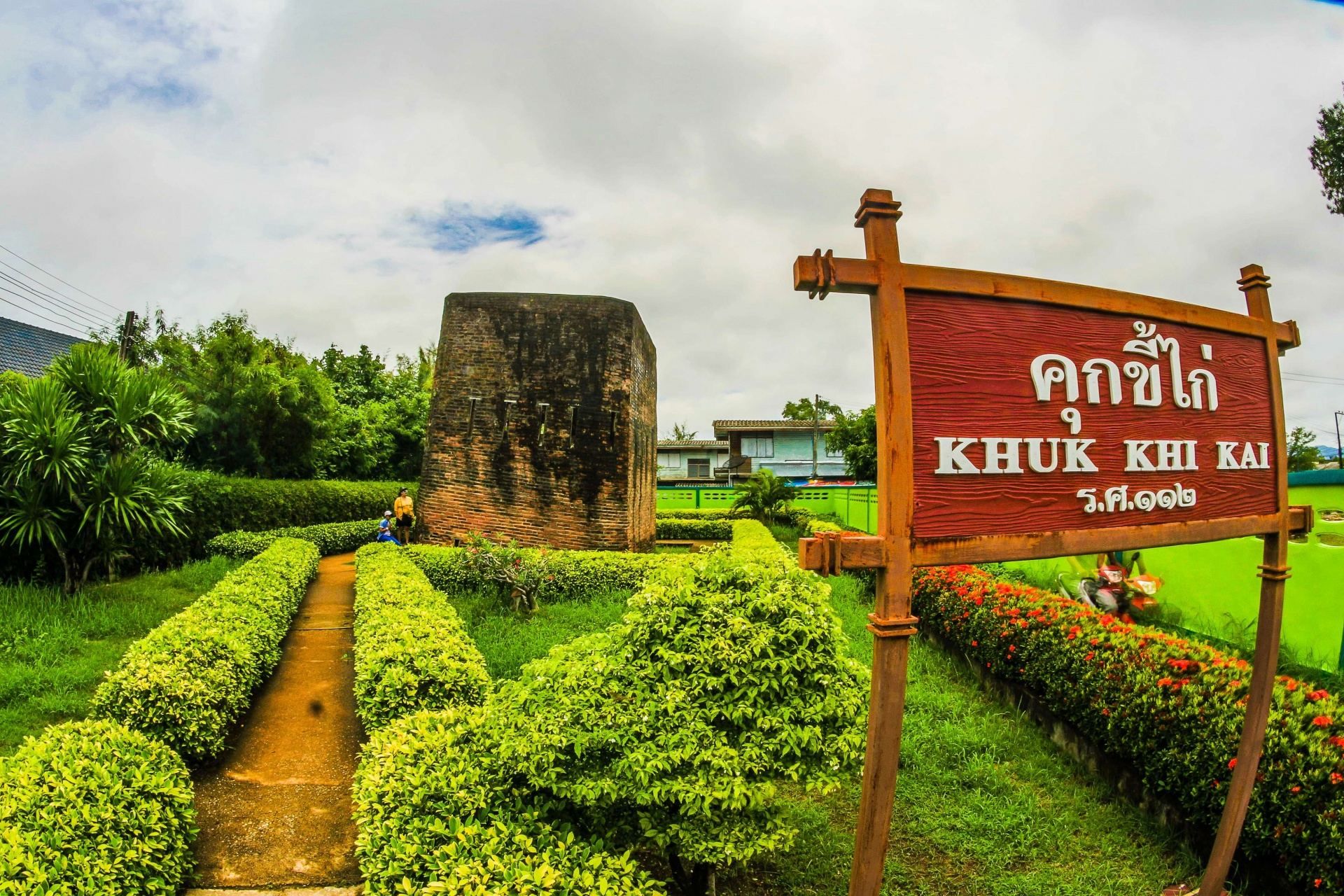
The Khuk Khi Kai prison, now a tourist attraction

Khuk Khi Kai (Thai: คุกขี้ไก่, pronounced [kʰúk kʰîː kàj]), also called the Chicken Dung Cell or Chicken Poop Prison, is a former prison in Laem Sing, Chanthaburi, Thailand. It was built by the French in 1893, when the French occupied the area as part of the Franco-Siamese conflict, to imprison Thai resistance fighters. The square-shaped tower is made from red bricks and is 4.4 metres wide and 7 metres tall, with two rows of slits along the sides. The tower was abandoned after the French withdrew in 1904.

The resistance prisoners were kept on the ground floor of the tower. Above them was a chicken coop. The floor between them was perforated meaning chicken faeces were able to fall down on the prisoners below, as a form of torture.
