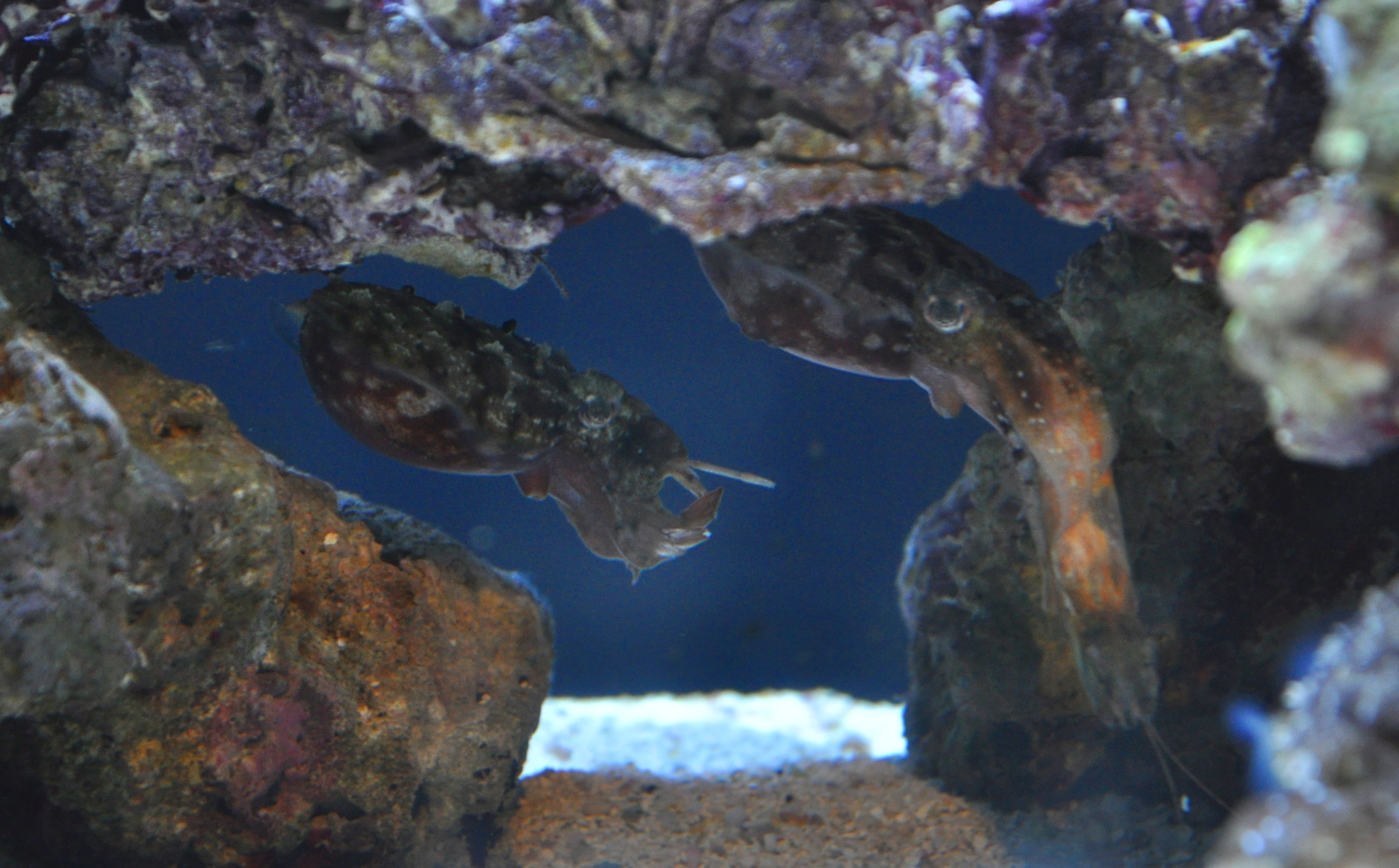
- Ascarosepion bandense at the Seattle Aquarium

Conservation status
- Data Deficient (IUCN 3.1)

Scientific classification
- Kingdom: Animalia
- Phylum: Mollusca
- Class: Cephalopoda
- Order: Sepiida
- Family: Sepiidae
- Genus: Ascarosepion
- Species: A. bandense

Binomial name
- Ascarosepion bandense Adam, 1939

= Dwarf cuttlefish =

Species of cuttlefish

The dwarf cuttlefish (Ascarosepion bandense), also known as the stumpy-spined cuttlefish, is a species of cuttlefish native to the shallow coastal waters of the Central Indo-Pacific. A 2023 phylogenetic analysis reassigned this species from its former name (Sepia bandensis). Sepia baxteri and Sepia bartletti are possible synonyms. It is common in coral reef and sandy coast habitats, usually in association with sea cucumbers and sea stars.

Like other cephalopods, the dwarf cuttlefish can rapidly change its skin pattern for camouflage and communication. It exhibits notable cognitive abilities, supported by a complex nervous system that includes a centralized brain and extensive networks of neurons in its arms. Due to its manageable size, rich behavioral repertoire, and growing genetic tools, it is increasingly used as a model organism in neuroscience and behavior research.

== Etymology ==
The genus name Ascarosepion comes from the Latinized forms of the Ancient Greek ἄσκαρος (áskăros) meaning "shoe" or "slipper" and σηπία (sēpía) meaning "cuttlefish". Ascarosepion was considered synonymous with Sepia until a 2023 phylogenetic study resurrected the genus. The species name bandense likely refers to the location the holotype was collected from, Banda Neira, along with the suffix -ense meaning "of" or "from".

== Description ==
As is typical of cuttlefish, the body of A. bandense consists of a mantle (generally around 4–7 cm at adult size), 8 visible arms, and 2 feeding tentacles (normally kept tucked inside the head). Their skin is covered in chromatophores and subcutaneous muscles known as papillae, both of which are under neural control. Chromatophores develop shortly before hatching and allow the cuttlefish to quickly and dramatically change its patterning. In a similar fashion, the papillae allow the cuttlefish to change its physical texture by raising and lowering portions of its skin. These changes in appearance are used for camouflaging to its environment, as well as social signaling between conspecifics.

After reaching sexual maturity, dwarf cuttlefish become sexually dimorphic. Males tend to grow larger than females and often live slightly longer (roughly 6–9 months for females and 9–12 months for males). Males and females also engage in sex-specific behaviors.

Dwarf cuttlefish swim by undulating the pair of translucent fins that line the edges of their mantle in conjunction with controlling their buoyancy using their cuttlebone. They are also capable of moving at high speeds by rapidly expelling water from their funnel. They are often observed "walking" along the sea floor—pulling themselves forward using their lowest pair of arms.

== Ecology ==
=== Life history ===
Female dwarf cuttlefish are reproductively active for a period 1–2 months, over which they can lay multiple clutches of eggs. Dwarf cuttlefish eggs are roughly 1 cm in diameter and covered in embryonic jelly mixed with ink for protection. Eggs are laid in clusters of around 5–40, resembling grapes, attached to corals or other firm surfaces and are left to develop without parental care.

After roughly four weeks, the eggs hatch into highly precocial cuttlefish which resemble a miniature version of their adult form. Within a few days, they are able to swim, camouflage, and hunt small prey. Dwarf cuttlefish reach sexual maturity at around 3–4 months after hatching, at which point males and females will mate with multiple partners. Males will compete for females using a characteristic aggressive display consisting of high-contrast longitudinal white bars on a black background. These displays often precede physical altercations between males, during which they will grapple each other with their arms and bite each other with their beaks. During mating, males will use their hectocotylus to place a bundle of spermatophores into the females' buccal area. Females can store sperm internally until they are ready to lay their eggs.

Once the reproductive period has ended, dwarf cuttlefish begin to show signs of senescence. They continue to grow until they die at around 9 months of age.

=== Feeding ===
Dwarf cuttlefish are generalist obligate carnivores, and hunt a variety of crustaceans and small fish. When a cuttlefish identifies a prey item, primarily by sight, they will often change patterns and "stalk" slowly towards it with their arms raised. The cuttlefish will then rapidly launch its feeding tentacles to grab the prey and pull it towards its oral cavity. The cuttlefish will hold onto its prey with its arms and inject it with venom to paralyze it. Once the prey is sedated, the cuttlefish will bite off small pieces with its beak. Research is currently ongoing into the precise makeup and evolution of cuttlefish venoms, and how they compare to those found in other animals.

=== Social behavior ===
Dwarf cuttlefish are mostly solitary in the wild, though some social behaviors have been observed. Dwarf cuttlefish will often produce patterns specific to social interactions with conspecifics. While some of these patterns have been associated with specific behaviors, e.g. aggression, it is unclear exactly how the majority of social patterns are used. In captivity, females and younger males can often be housed together if provided with sufficient space.

== Nervous system ==
Despite having diverged from the clade containing vertebrates over 500 million years ago, cuttlefish display a remarkable degree of intelligence. Many aspects of the cephalopod nervous system are also organized in ways resembling those of vertebrates.

However, the cephalopod brain also differs from vertebrate brains in several significant ways. Neurons in the cephalopod brain are generally unipolar and unmyelinated. Within brain lobes, neurons tend to be organized with cell bodies around the perimeter and neurites extending inwards to form a neuropil. None of the classic regions identified in vertebrate brains exist in cephalopods per se, though various analogs have been suggested. Unlike in vertebrates where the vast majority of the neurons in the body are localized in the central brain, cephalopod neurons are far more distributed. Along with the central brain, a significant proportion of neurons in cephalopods are distributed in ganglia in their arms. In cuttlefish specifically, arms have been shown to be able to learn certain tasks without the central brain's involvement.

=== Central brain ===
The central brain of the dwarf cuttlefish consists of 32 distinct lobes arranged around the esophagus inside the head. The posterior portion of the brain is protected by a layer of cartilage. For the most part, these lobes are roughly organized into 2 larger structures known as the supra- and subesophageal masses, located above and below the esophagus respectively, as well as the optic tract complex. The brain lobes and their associated organizational units are as follows:

- Supraesophageal mass
  - Vertical lobe complex
    - Vertical lobe
    - Subvertical lobe
    - Superior frontal lobe
    - Inferior frontal lobe
    - Posterior frontal lobe
  - Basal lobe complex
    - Anterior anterior basal lobe
    - Anterior posterior basal lobe
    - Precommissural lobe
    - Dorsal basal lobe
    - Interbasal lobes
    - Median basal lobe
    - Lateral basal lobes
- Subesophageal mass
  - Pedal lobe complex
    - Anterior pedal lobe
    - Posterior pedal lobe
    - Lateral pedal lobes
    - Anterior dorsal chromatophore lobes
    - Anterior ventral chromatophore lobes
  - Magnocellular lobe complex
    - Dorsal magnocellular lobes
    - Ventral magnocellular lobes
    - Posterior magnocellular lobes
  - Palliovisceral lobe complex
    - Palliovisceral lobe
    - Lateral ventral palliovisceral lobes
    - Posterior chromatophore lobes
    - Dorsal vasomotor lobe
    - Ventral vasomotor lobe
  - Brachial lobe complex
    - Brachial lobe
    - Superior buccal lobe
    - Inferior buccal lobe
- Optic tract complex
  - Optic lobes
  - Peduncle lobes
  - Dorsolateral lobes
  - Optic glands
  - Olfactory lobes

=== Vision ===
Similar to vertebrate eyes, cuttlefish eyes focus light onto a photosensitive retina through a pupil and a lens. Cuttlefish pupils are able to expand and contract to adjust to variable light conditions; when contracted the pupil forms a unique wavy-shaped opening (often described as a "W"). In contrast to humans, where light is focused by adjusting the shape of the lens, cuttlefish lenses have a fixed shape and are focused by moving them relative to the retinae. Information from photoreceptors is sent to the ipsilateral optic lobe for processing through numerous nerve tracts. The optic lobes of a dwarf cuttlefish comprise 75% of its brain by volume. A large projection from the optic lobes is to the lateral basal lobes. It is suggested that this pathway is involved in converting visual stimuli to skin patterns via the chromatophore lobes (which go on the innervate the chromatophore muscles across the skin).

Only a single type of photoreceptor has been found in cuttlefish retinae, suggesting that cuttlefish may be colorblind. This finding makes it unclear how exactly cuttlefish are able to camouflage so well to different colored backgrounds. One proposed mechanism is chromatic aberration, where their W-shaped pupils scatter different colors of light onto different sections of the retina. Other proposed mechanisms include RNA editing or using information from polarized light—which cuttlefish are able to detect. In opposition to this, some studies suggest that cuttlefish may indeed be truly colorblind, and are only able to distinguish colors by contrast. At present it remains uncertain which of these hypotheses, if any, are accurate.

=== Camouflage ===
While not as flexible as some other cephalopods, the dwarf cuttlefish is capable of generating an impressive array of different patterns. In contrast to many other color changing animals, cephalopod chromatophores are neurally controlled, allowing them to change patterns in less than a second. Cephalopod chromatophores consist of a pigment-filled cell surrounded by a ring of muscles. Upon receiving input from the brain, the muscles surrounding the chromatophore can contract, expanding the cell and making the color visible in that section of skin. When the muscles relax, the cell shrinks back down due to elastic tension, making the color invisible. Dwarf cuttlefish generally tend to match their background, but have various other patterns that seem to be displayed primarily during social interactions. Dwarf cuttlefish are capable of displaying 2 different patterns simultaneously—one on each lateral half of the body—which suggests that each of the 2 chromatophore lobes might be able to independently control each half of the body.

While cuttlefish blend in remarkably well to their environments, they do not perfectly duplicate their visual environment. Instead, it is suggested that the cuttlefish optic pathway might compute certain texture statistics of the visual environment, and uses those statistics to generate a novel pattern that nonetheless blends in to its environment.

=== Chemoreception ===
Chemoreception varies across cuttlefish groups, though dwarf cuttlefish are likely able to sense chemical cues through receptors in their suckers.

=== Somatosensation ===
Cephalopods use tactile information, especially from their arms, to explore their environment and coordinate prey capture.

=== Learning and memory ===
Dwarf cuttlefish have been shown to be able to learn complex behaviors and have episodic-like memory. Many of these behaviors, especially those involving visual and pain cues, have been associated with the vertical lobe. The vertical lobe consists of a sparsely connected encoder-decoder network often referred to as a "cerebellum-like structure" due to its resemblance to the canonical cerebellar circuit. These types of structures, which also include the mushroom body in insects and the trisynaptic circuit in mammalian hippocampus, have been shown to be useful in pattern separation—a key component of learning to associate complex stimuli with the appropriate actions. Although octopuses and cuttlefish share this same structure, the sites of learning differ between the two taxa. It is yet unclear what implications this difference might have.

=== As a model organism ===
Due to their behavioral repertoire, short generation time, and relative ease of handling in a laboratory setting, the dwarf cuttlefish is gaining popularity as a cephalopod model organism. Work is currently ongoing to create a transgenic line in order to more easily track neural activity in live animals.

== See also ==
- Common cuttlefish
- Cuttlefish
- Cuttlebone
- Cephalopods
- Camouflage
- Cephalopod intelligence
