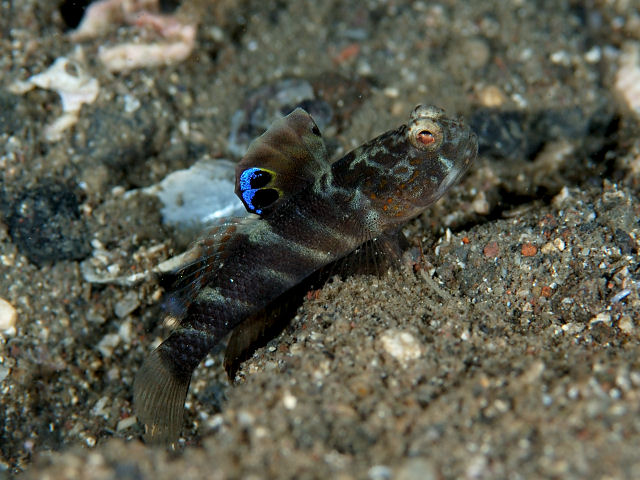

Conservation status
- Least Concern (IUCN 3.1)

Scientific classification
- Kingdom: Animalia
- Phylum: Chordata
- Class: Actinopterygii
- Order: Gobiiformes
- Family: Gobiidae
- Genus: Mahidolia
- Species: M. mystacina

Binomial name
- Mahidolia mystacina (Valenciennes, 1837)

Synonyms
- Gobius mystacinus Valenciennes, 1837; Waitea mystacina (Valenciennes, 1837); Gobius pulverulentus Kuhl & van Hasselt, 1837; Mahidiolia normani H. M. Smith & Koumans, 1932; Mahidiolia duque J. L. B. Smith, 1947; Waitea buchanani Visweswara Rao, 1972

= Mahidolia mystacina =

Species of fish

Mahidolia mystacina, the flagfin prawn goby, flagfin shrimpgoby or smiling goby, is a species of goby native to the Indian Ocean and the Pacific Ocean from Delagoa Bay, Mozambique to the Society Islands and from southern Japan to Samoa and northern Australia. This species occurs in marine and brackish waters, being found in coastal bays, estuaries and reef bases where the bottom is silty or muddy at depths of from 5 to 25 metres (16 to 82 ft). This species is a commensal with a species of alpheid shrimp, using its burrow as its home. This species can reach a length of 8 centimetres (3.1 in) TL. This species can also be found in the aquarium trade. It was first discovered at the mouth of the Chanthaburi River, Amphoe Laem Sing, Chanthaburi Province, Eastern Thailand by H. M. Smith.
