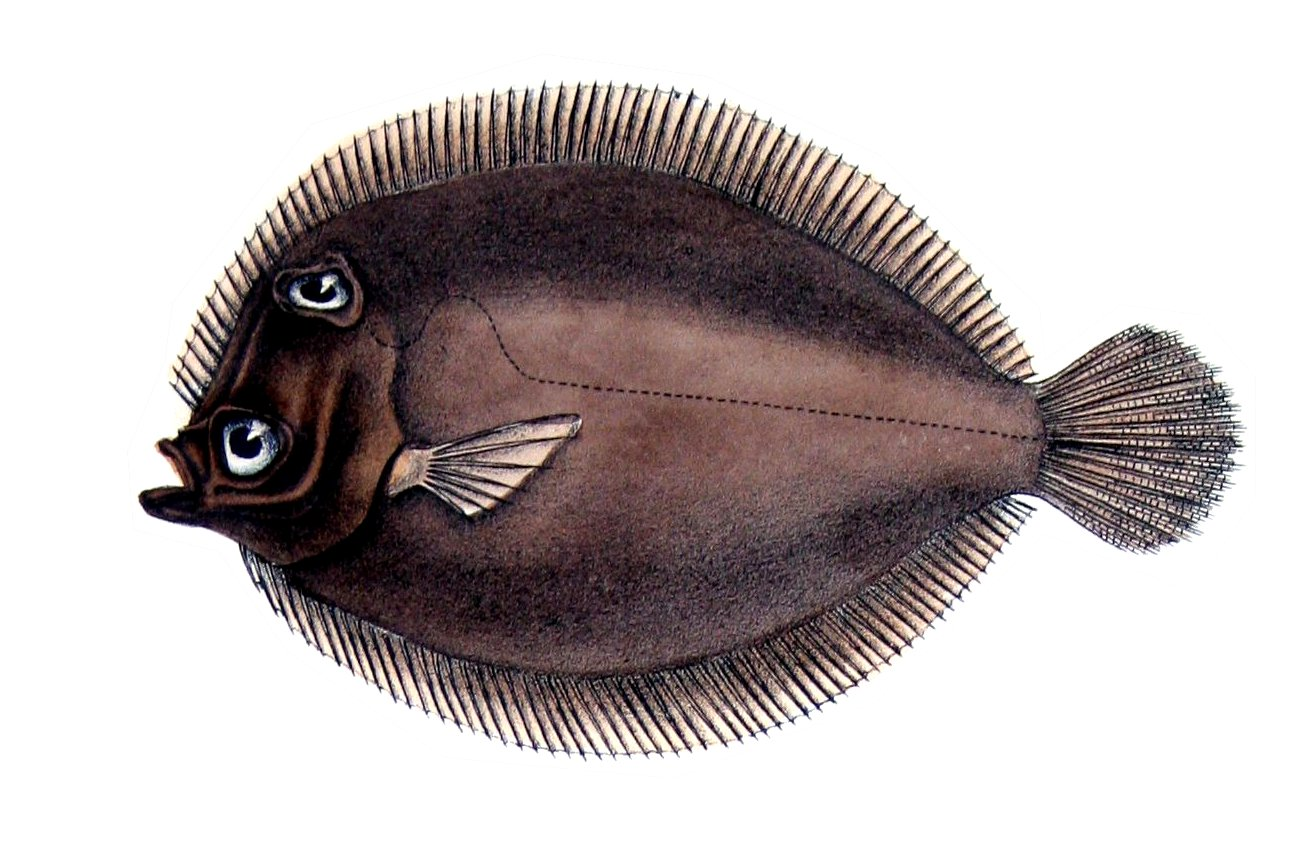

Conservation status
- Least Concern (IUCN 3.1)

Scientific classification
- Kingdom: Animalia
- Phylum: Chordata
- Class: Actinopterygii
- Order: Carangiformes
- Suborder: Pleuronectoidei
- Family: Bothidae
- Genus: Bothus
- Species: B. ocellatus

Binomial name
- Bothus ocellatus (Agassiz, 1831)

Synonyms
- Platophrys ocellatus (Agassiz, 1831); Rhombus bahianus Castelnau, 1855; Rhombus ocellatus Agassiz, 1831

= Eyed flounder =

Species of fish

The eyed flounder (Bothus ocellatus) is a species of fish in the family Bothidae (lefteye flounders). The species is found on or near the sandy seabed in relatively shallow waters in the western Atlantic Ocean, the Caribbean Sea and the Gulf of Mexico.

== Description ==
The eyed flounder is a flattened, disc-shaped fish which grows to a maximum length of 18 cm (7 in) but a more typical size is 12 cm (5 in). As with other members of its family, it lies on its right side, and during its development, its right eye migrates to the left side of its head. The protractile mouth is large and the male fish has a spine on the snout and a bony lump in front of the lower eye. The eyes are large and prominent, the lower one being slightly nearer the snout than the upper one. Both eyes have a fleshy ridge above and behind them. The dorsal fin has 76 to 91 soft rays and has its origin close to the upper eye. It is long and ribbon-like and there is a gap between it and the caudal fin. The anal fin has 58 to 69 soft rays and is also long and distinct from the caudal fin. The color of this fish is pale tan, grey or brown, with patches, mottling and ring-shaped markings, the fish being able to modify its color to match its background. It can change its color in between two and eight seconds. Three larger dark spots lie on the straight portion of the lateral line and there are two fainter ones on the tail. It differs from the slightly darker twospot flounder (Bothus robinsi) because its tail spots are one above the other in this species but one behind the other in the twospot flounder. The underside of this species is pale.

== Distribution and habitat ==
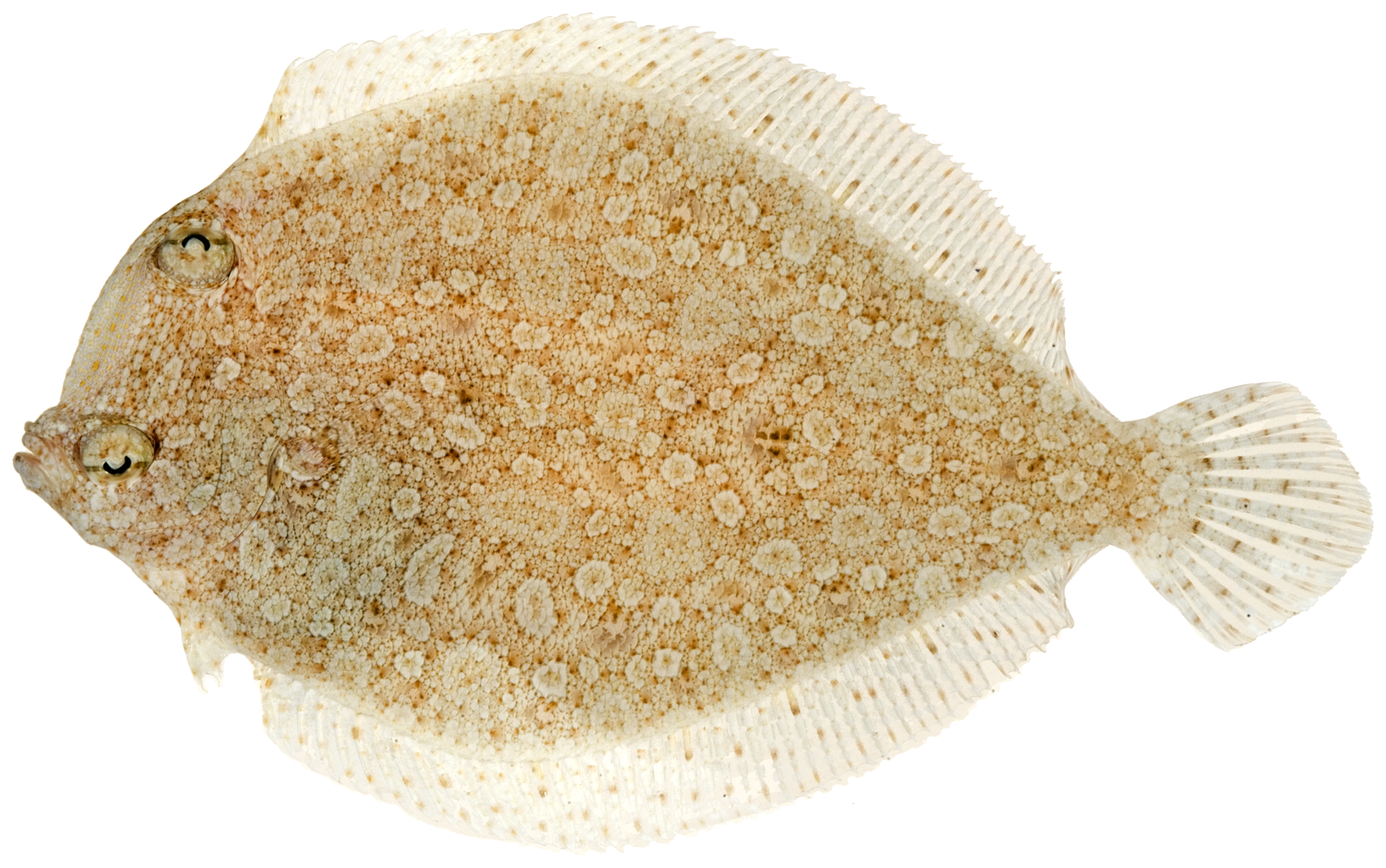
Eyed flounder

The eyed flounder is found in the western Atlantic Ocean, the Caribbean Sea and the Gulf of Mexico, its range extending from Canada to southern Brazil. Its typical habitat is sandy flats in the vicinity of patch reefs, often near areas of coral rubble and seagrass meadows. It commonly occurs at depths down to about 50 m (164 ft) but is sometimes found at greater depths, down to 110 m (361 ft). It spends most of the time lying on the seabed, sometimes semi-immersed in the sediment.

== Biology ==
The eyed flounder feeds on fish, which makes up about a third of its diet, and on crustaceans such as crabs, mantis shrimps, shrimps and amphipods.

Near the island of Bonaire, reproduction takes place during the winter. A male eyed flounder defends a territory in which are up to six females, each with its own individual area. Courtship starts about an hour before sunset, and around the time the sun sets culminates in the female swimming a short way off the bottom with the male immediately below her. Both release their spawn simultaneously into the water. The male tries to mate with each of the females on a daily basis. When the larvae hatch from the fertilised eggs, they are pelagic and form part of the plankton in the open water, and their eyes are at first orientated in a normal, symmetrical manner. During their growth and development the eyes migrate to their adult position on the left side of the head. The larvae and juvenile fish form part of the diet of many fish and invertebrates, and the adults are preyed on by predatory fishes, gulls, egrets, herons, seals and sea lions.
