= Redigobius balteatus =

Conservation status
- Least Concern (IUCN 3.1)

Scientific classification
- Kingdom: Animalia
- Phylum: Chordata
- Class: Actinopterygii
- Order: Gobiiformes
- Family: Oxudercidae
- Genus: Redigobius
- Species: R. balteatus

Binomial name
- Redigobius balteatus (Herre, 1935)

Synonyms
- Vaimosa balteata Herre, 1935

Species of fish

Redigobius balteatus, the rhinohorn goby, girdled goby or skunk goby, is a species of goby native to the Sri Lanka, Philippines, Malaysia, Indonesia, Japan, New Guinea, Madagascar, and Mozambique. This species inhabits coastal estuaries, lakes and freshwater streams. It can reach a length of 3.8 centimetres (1.5 in) SL.
