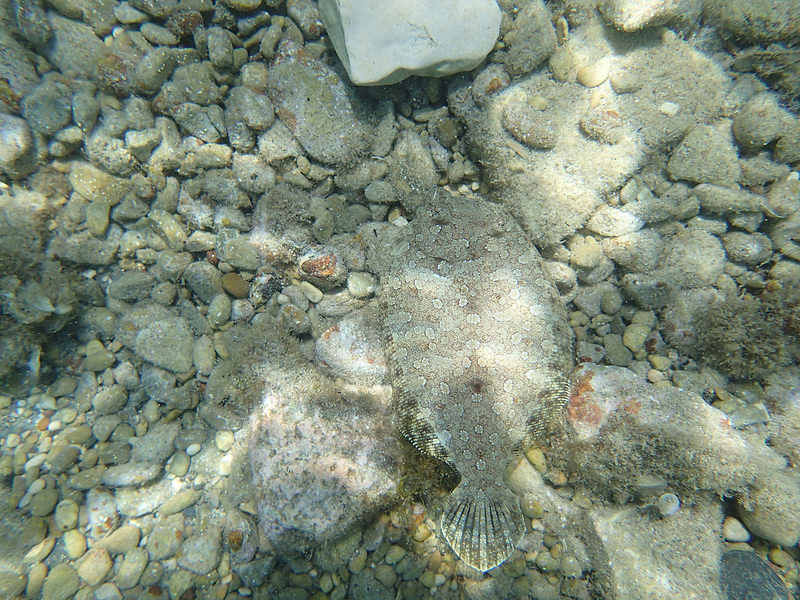
- Bothus podas in Croatia

Conservation status
- Least Concern (IUCN 3.1)

Scientific classification
- Kingdom: Animalia
- Phylum: Chordata
- Class: Actinopterygii
- Order: Carangiformes
- Suborder: Pleuronectoidei
- Family: Bothidae
- Genus: Bothus
- Species: B. podas

Binomial name
- Bothus podas (Delaroche, 1809)

Synonyms
- Bothus africanus Nielsen, 1961; Bothus diaphanus Rafinesque, 1814; Peloria heckelii Cocco, 1844; Platophrys podas (Delaroche, 1809); Pleuronectes podas Delaroche, 1809; Rhomboidichthys podas (Delaroche, 1809); Rhombus gesneri Risso, 1827; Rhombus heterophthalmus Bennett, 1831; Rhombus maderensis Lowe, 1834; Rhombus serratus Valenciennes, 1839; Solea rhomboide Rafinesque, 1810

= Bothus podas =

Wide-eyed flounder

Species of fish

Bothus podas, also known as the wide-eyed flounder, is a flounder in the genus Bothus, native to the Mediterranean Sea and the Atlantic Coast of Africa.

During the reproductive season, males court and mate successively with females in their territories, and females seem to show mating fidelity to their dominant male. Data also show that courtship plays an important role in determining male success in mating.
