= Shrimp goby =

Shrimp goby or prawn goby may refer to any of several genera of fishes in the subfamily Gobiinae, including:

- Amblyeleotris
- Cryptocentrus
- Mahidolia
- Stonogobiops
