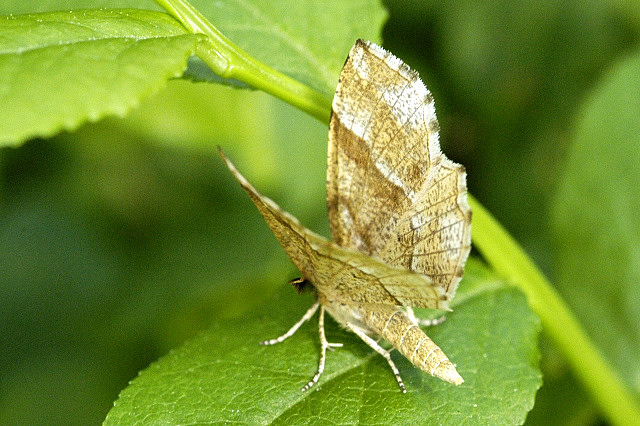

Scientific classification
- Kingdom: Animalia
- Phylum: Arthropoda
- Clade: Pancrustacea
- Class: Insecta
- Order: Lepidoptera
- Family: Geometridae
- Genus: Cepphis
- Species: C. advenaria

Binomial name
- Cepphis advenaria (Hübner, 1790)

= Cepphis advenaria =

Species of moth

Cepphis advenaria, the little thorn, is a moth of the family Geometridae. The species can be found in Europe and across the Palearctic to Japan.

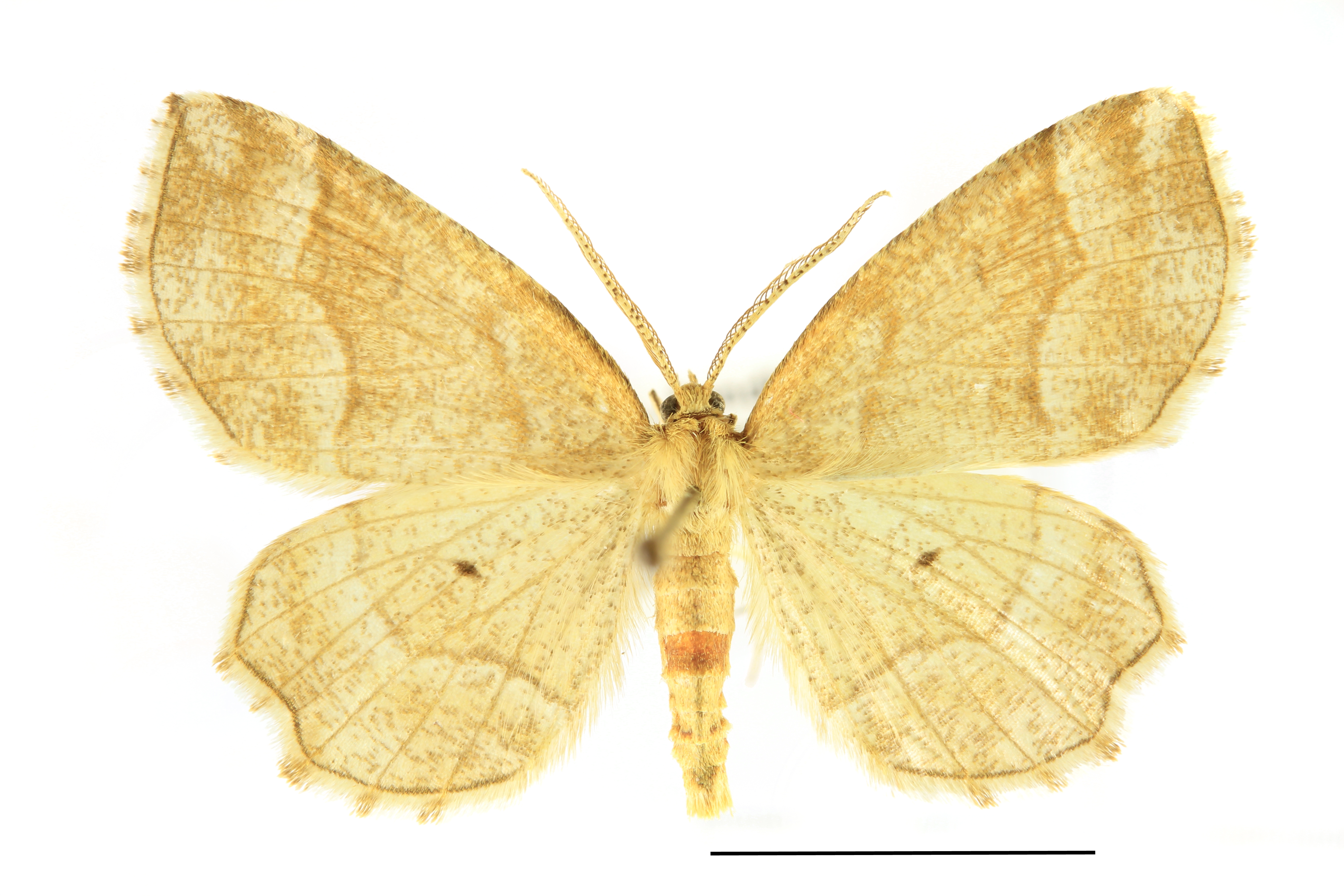
Specimen from Sweden

== Description ==
The wingspan is 23–26 mm. The length of the forewings is 14–17 mm. The ground colour is usually whitish, or whitish ochreous freckled and clouded with grey brown or much mixed with deep ochreous. The cross lines are slightly darker. The 1st line of the forewing is sometimes nearly straight, the 2nd line has an angle in the middle, posteriorly curved, commonly oblique out wards at hindmargin The markings may be tinged with ochreous, or with red. On the rear wing is a dark dot. ab. fulva Gillmer is so uniformly irrorated as to appear dark yellow-brown throughout, unmarked except by the discal dots. The larva is variable, purplish grey or olive brown, abdomen with pale grey dorsal lozenges and 2 pale yellow oblique spots or dashes on the 2nd abdominal. The venter is more reddish, with dark V-shaped markings. The pupa is stout and rugose, not glossy; dorsum and abdomen light brown, the wings, legs greenish. See also the genus description (references - Watson, L., and Dallwitz, M.J. 2003) and Prout

== Biology ==
The moths fly from May to June. The little thorn flies during the day, preferably when it is sunny. They rest with half open fore-wings, held above the back wings.

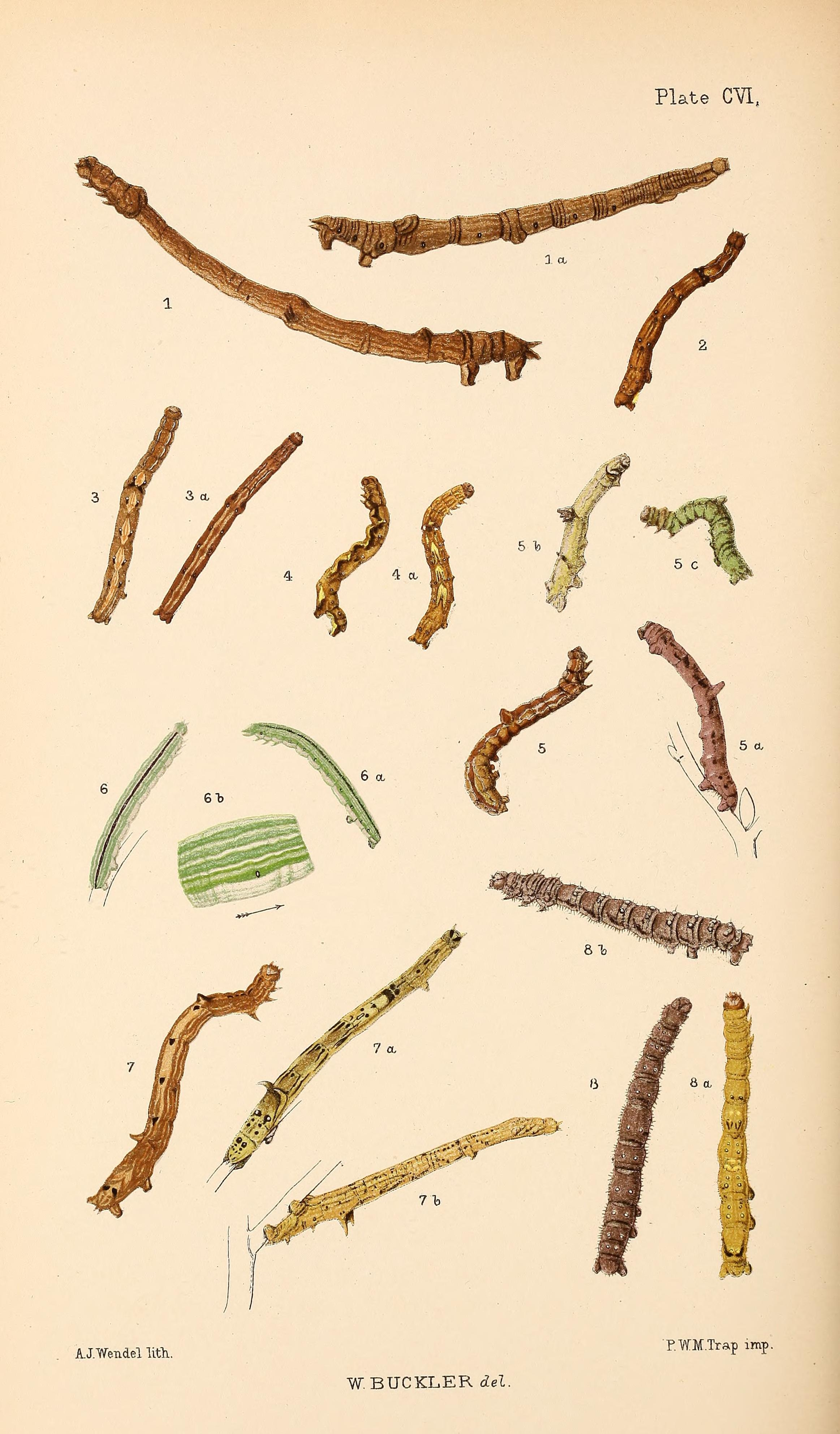
Fig. 4,4a Cepphis advenaria larva after final moult

The larvae feed mainly on bilberry (Vaccinium myrtillus), but probably has alternative food plants as it occurs on sites without bilberry. In captivity, larvae accept bramble (Rubus fruticosus) and wild roses (Rosa species).

== Distribution ==
Found in Europe and across Russia to the Altai, the Sajan Mountains, the Amur region, the Primorye region, Sakhalin and the Kuril Islands, as well as in Eastern China, Korea and Japan. The main habitats are blueberry forests, heaths and bogs. In the Alps, the species rises to an altitude of 1500 metres.

== Notes ==
1. The flight season refers to the British Isles. This may vary in other parts of the range.
