= Pak Nam Laem Sing =

Pak Nam Laem Sing ปากน้ำแหลมสิงห์
- Tambon
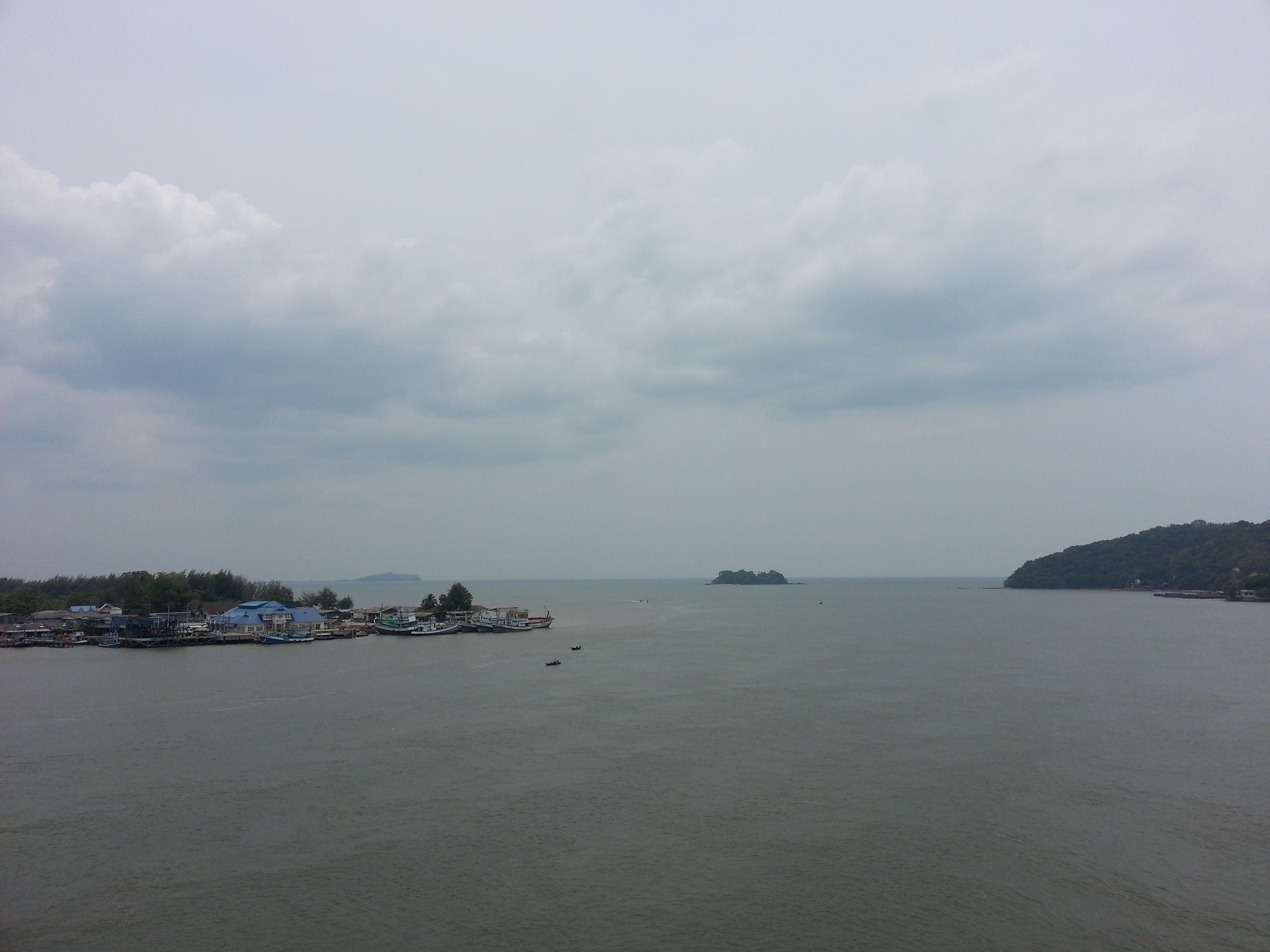
- View of the Gulf of Thailand's estuary as seen from the Taksin Maharat Bridge
- Interactive map of Pak Nam Laem Sing
- Coordinates: 12°29′2.7″N 102°4′0.87″E
- Country: Thailand
- Province: Chanthaburi
- District: Laem Sing
- Named for: Local geography

Government
  - Type: Subdistrict Municipality
  - Mayor: Somnuek Saithong
  - Deputy Mayor: Thammarat Chaihat
  - Deputy Mayor: Phanawan Taewkhlang

Area
  - Total: 37.935 km^{2} (14.647 sq mi)
- Time zone: UTC+7 (ICT)
- Postcode: 22130
- Area code: (+66) 02
- Website: https://laemsingha.go.th

Pak Nam Laem Sing (Thai: ปากน้ำแหลมสิงห์, pronounced [pàːk náːm lɛ̌ːm sǐŋ]) is a tambon (sub-district) of Laem Sing district, Chanthaburi province, Thailand. The sub-district is also the type locality of the goby species Mahidolia mystacina, described by H. M. Smith in 1932.

== Geography and toponymy ==
"Pak Nam Laem Sing" refers to the river mouth located in Laem Sing district. It is the point where the Chanthaburi river empties into the Gulf of Thailand. The area is named Laem Sing (lit. 'lion cape') because there used to be a rock shaped like a crouching lion at the tip of the cape. This specific location is called the mouth of the Chanthaburi river, and the combined name of the area became "Pak Nam Laem Sing".

Neighbouring areas are (from the north clockwise) Bang Sa Kao, Khlong Nam Khem, Ko Proet, with Krachio in its district, Gulf of Thailand, and Chanthaburi river, respectively.

The sub-district is less than 30 km (18.6 mi) from Chanthaburi town.

== Administration ==
The entire area is under the administration of Pak Nam Laem Sing Subdistrict Municipality.

The municipality seal depicts a mountain and the Chanthaburi river, along with a lion-shaped rock and the sun and clouds, all enclosed within a circular frame.

The area also consists of 16 administrative muban (villages).
