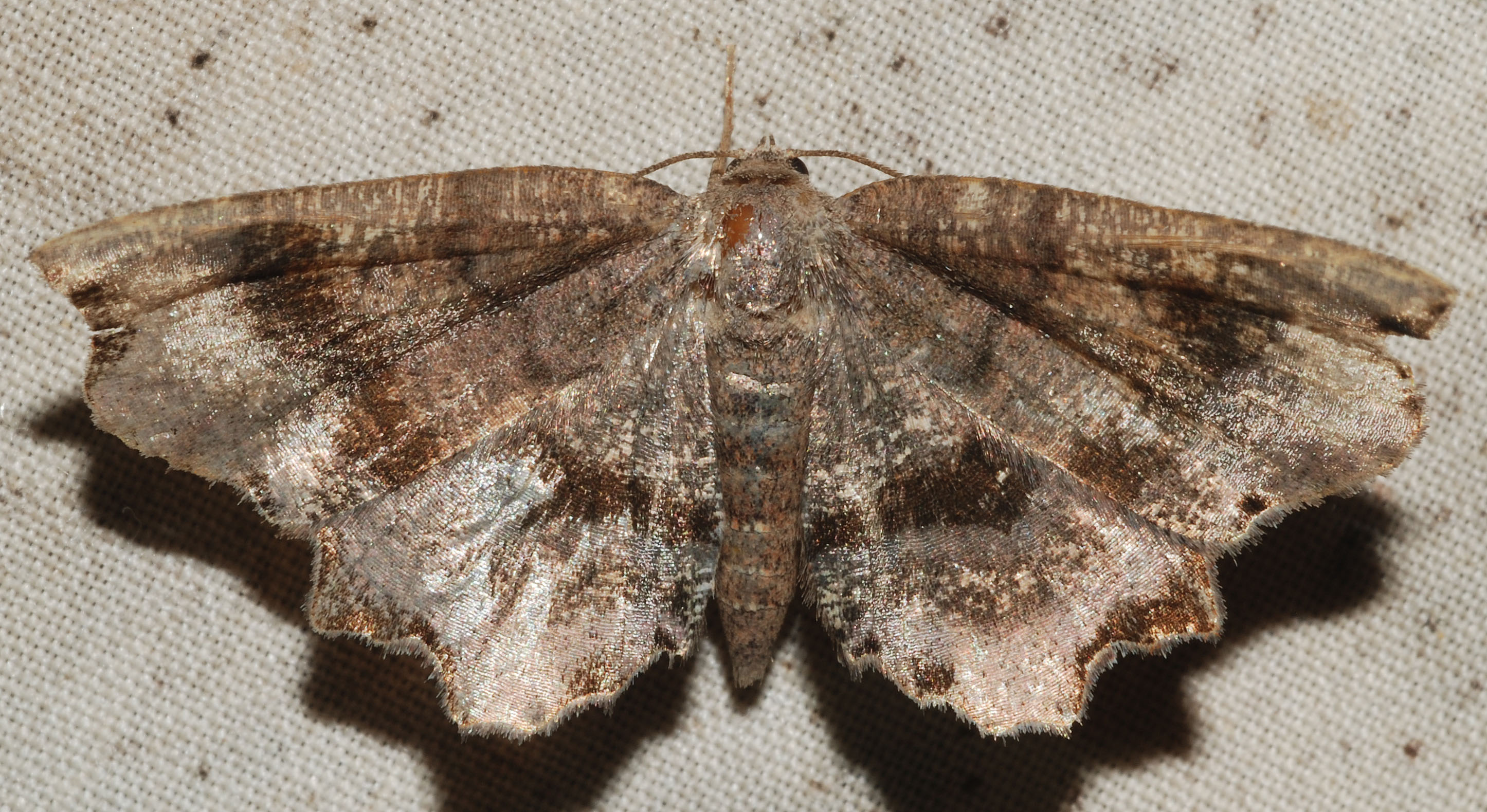
- Cepphis decoloraria

Scientific classification
- Domain: Eukaryota
- Kingdom: Animalia
- Phylum: Arthropoda
- Class: Insecta
- Order: Lepidoptera
- Family: Geometridae
- Genus: Cepphis
- Species: C. decoloraria

Binomial name
- Cepphis decoloraria (Hulst, 1886)

= Cepphis decoloraria =

Species of moth

Cepphis decoloraria, the dark scallop moth, is a species of geometrid moth in the family Geometridae.

The MONA or Hodges number for Cepphis decoloraria is 6834.
