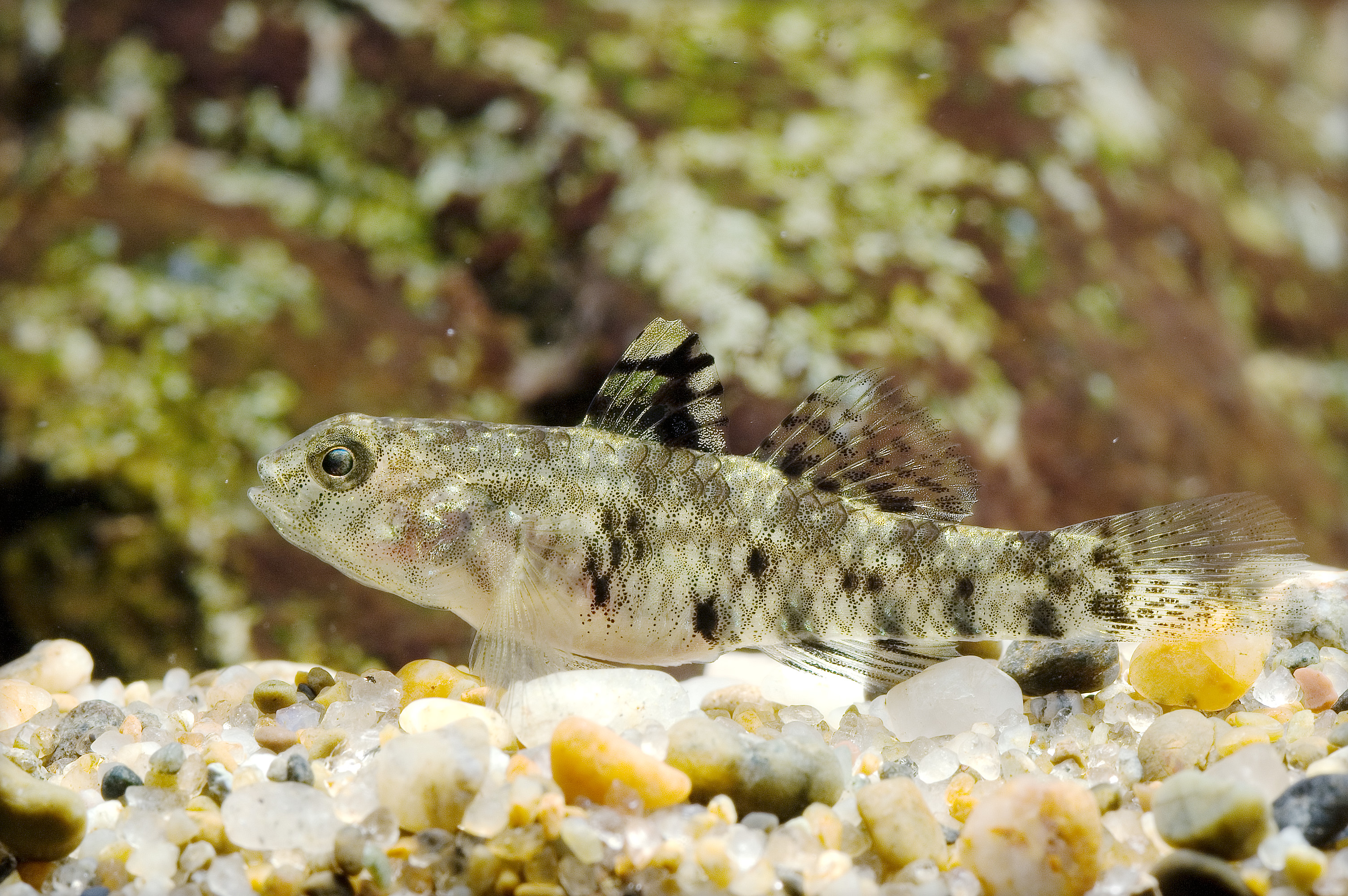
- Redigobius bikolanus

Scientific classification
- Kingdom: Animalia
- Phylum: Chordata
- Class: Actinopterygii
- Order: Gobiiformes
- Family: Oxudercidae
- Subfamily: Gobionellinae
- Genus: Redigobius; Herre, 1927

Type species
- Gobius sternbergi H. M. Smith, 1902

Synonyms
- Cyprinogobius Koumans, 1937; Ostreogobius Whitley, 1930; Parvigobius Whitley, 1930

= Redigobius =

Genus of fishes

Redigobius is a genus of fish in the goby family, Oxudercidae, known commonly as dualspot gobies. They are native to the western Indo-Pacific region, where they occur in estuaries and freshwater habitats just above the tidal influence.

Some of these gobies are abundant fish species. The most widespread is the speckled goby (R. bikolanus), which occurs throughout the western Pacific Ocean and from Australia to Africa. Some Redigobius are kept as aquarium pets. The Fijian endemic Lever's goby (R. leveri) is featured on the ten-dollar bill in the 2013 series of Fijian currency.

== Species ==
There are currently 15 recognized species in this genus.

Species include:

- Redigobius amblyrhynchus (Bleeker, 1878) (Species inquirenda)
- Redigobius balteatus (Herre, 1935) (rhinohorn goby)
- Redigobius bikolanus (Herre, 1927) (speckled goby)
- Redigobius chrysosoma (Bleeker, 1875) (spotfin goby)
- Redigobius dewaali (M. C. W. Weber, 1897) (checked goby)
- Redigobius dispar (W. K. H. Peters, 1868)
- Redigobius fotuno Kobayashi, Sumarto, Mokodongan, Lawelle, Masengi & Yamahira, 2024
- Redigobius lekutu Larson, 2010
- Redigobius leveri (Fowler, 1943) (Lever's goby)
- Redigobius macrostoma (Günther, 1861) (large-mouth goby)
- Redigobius micrognathus Visweswara Rao, 1971 (Species inquirenda)
- Redigobius nanus Larson, 2010
- Redigobius oyensi (de Beaufort, 1913)
- Redigobius penango (Popta, 1922)
- Redigobius rivalis (Herre, 1927) (Species inquirenda)
- Redigobius samberanoensis (Bleeker, 1867)
- Redigobius tambujon (Bleeker, 1854) (Roemer's goby)
- Redigobius vergeri (Bleeker, 1867)

Synonyms

- Redigobius balteatops (J. L. B. Smith, 1959); valid as B. balteatus (bull goby)
- Redigobius isognathus (Bleeker, 1878); valid as R. bikolanus
