= List of animals that can change color =

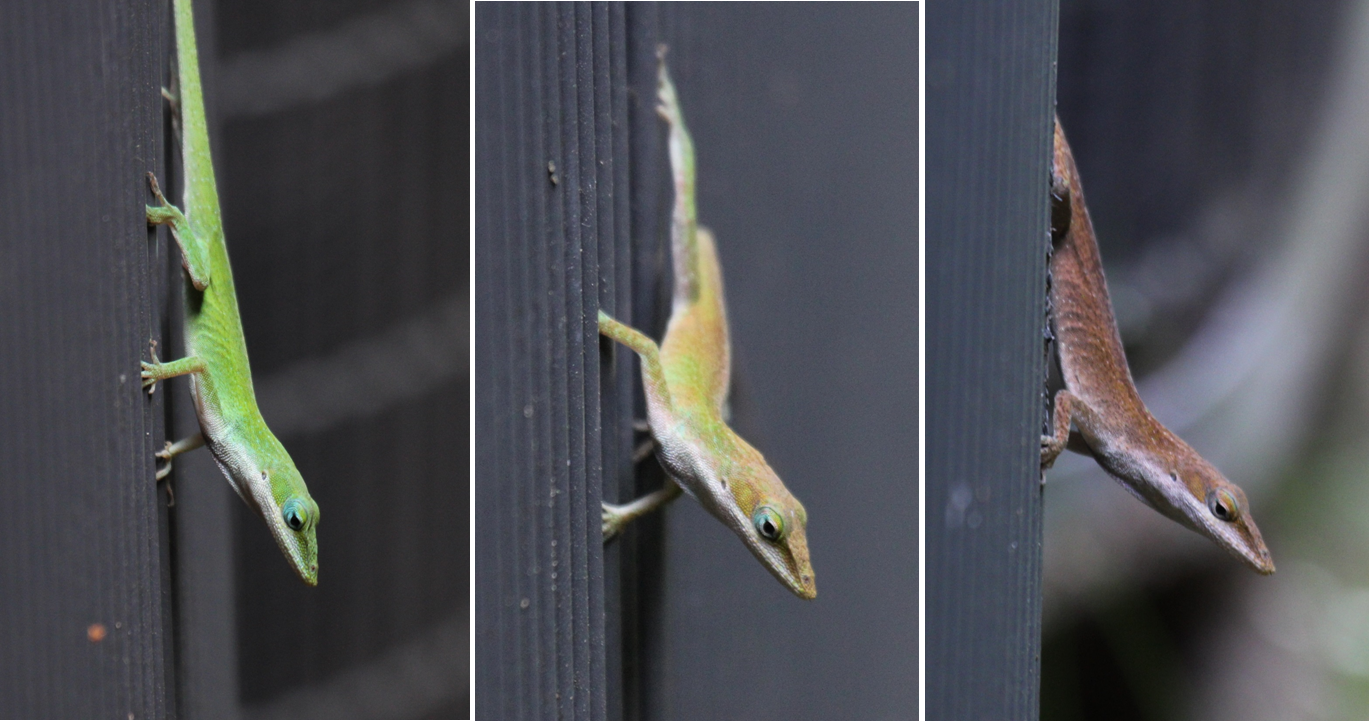
A Carolina anole changing from green to brown over a few minutes

Some animals are capable of changing their colors with varying degrees of transformation. This may be a very gradual (shedding of fur or feathers) seasonal camouflage, occurring only twice a year. In other animals more rapid changes may be a form of active camouflage, or of signalling.

== Examples ==
Examples of animals that change color include:

=== Mammals and birds ===
- Alaskan hare - In the summer, Alaskan hares have a brown fur coat with white under parts. In the winter, they have a white fur coat with black-tipped ears. They also shed their gray-brown summer topcoat, becoming all white during the winter.
- Arctic hare - In Newfoundland and southern Labrador, the Arctic hare changes its coat color, moulting and growing new fur, from brown or grey in the summer to white in the winter, like some other Arctic animals including ermine and ptarmigan, enabling it to remain camouflaged as the environment changes. However, the Arctic hares in the far north of Canada, where summer is very short, remain white all year round.
- Arctic fox
- Rock ptarmigan
- Willow ptarmigan
- Snowshoe hare
- Stoat
- Long-tailed duck
- Crested caracara

=== Reptiles and amphibians ===
- Chameleons - Colour change signals a chameleon's physiological condition and intentions to other chameleons. Because chameleons are ectothermic, they change color also to regulate their body temperatures, either to a darker color to absorb light and heat to raise their temperature, or to a lighter color to reflect light and heat, thereby either stabilizing or lowering their body temperature and also for camouflage.
- Anoles - The majority of anoles (Dactyloidae) can change their color depending on things like emotions (for example, aggression or stress), activity level, levels of light and as a social signal (for example, displaying dominance).
- Frogs, e.g. gray treefrog and Peron's tree frog (which can change colour in less than one hour).
- Snakes - the Kapuas mud snake is dark brown or black, with a red and black striped underbelly; however, when put in lighter environments it can change the color of its top scales to white.

=== Molluscs ===
- Cephalopod - Cephalopods can change their colors and patterns in milliseconds, whether for signalling (both within the species and for warning) or active camouflage, as their chromatophores are expanded or contracted. Although color changes appear to rely primarily on vision input, there is evidence that skin cells, specifically chromatophores, can detect light and adjust to light conditions independently of the eyes.

=== Crustaceans ===
- Shrimp - several shrimp species are called "chameleon shrimp" due to an ability to change colour, including Calliasmata pholidota, Hippolyte varians and Praunus flexuosus.

=== Fish ===
- Many fish change colors, including several species of gobies and groupers. Color changes may be initiated by changes in mood, temperature, and stress in addition to visible changes in the local environment.
- Flounder e.g. Hippoglossina oblonga
- Syngnathidae (including seahorses)

=== Insects and spiders ===
- Charidotella sexpunctata - Adults can turn from shiny gold through reddish-brown when disturbed.
- Misumena vatia - The color change from white to yellow (depending on the color of the flowers on which the spider is hunting) takes between 10 and 25 days; the reverse about six days.
- Chrysso venusta has been observed to rapidly change its color when disturbed.
- Some spiders, including Cyrtophora cicatrosa, can change colour rapidly.
- Thomisus spectabilis

== See also ==
- Bioluminescence
- Peppered moth evolution - an example of colour change during evolution
