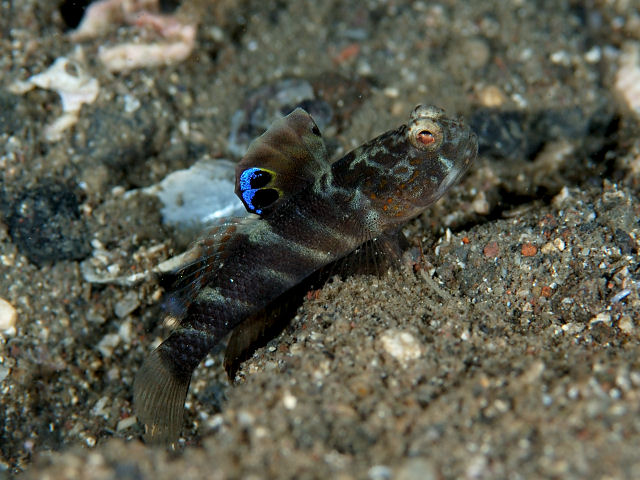
- Mahidolia parvida

Scientific classification
- Kingdom: Animalia
- Phylum: Chordata
- Class: Actinopterygii
- Division: Teleostei
- Order: Gobiiformes
- Family: Gobiidae
- Genus: Mahidolia; H. M. Smith, 1932

Synonyms
- Rictugobius Koumans in Smith, 1932

= Mahidolia =

Genus of fishes

Mahidolia is a small genus of gobies native to the Indian Ocean and the Western Pacific Ocean. Both species are commensal with species of alpheid shrimps.

== Etymology ==
The generic name Mahidolia is named in honour of Mahidol Adulyadej, Prince of Songkhla (1892–1929) who was the father of King Ananda Mahidol (Rama VIII) and King Bhumibol (Rama IX), as a supporter of fisheries in Siam (today's Thailand).

== Species ==
There are currently two valid species:

- Mahidolia mystacina (Valenciennes, 1837) (Flagfin prawn goby)
- Mahidolia paucipora Allen & Erdmann, 2019 (Tiny shrimpgoby)

Synonyms

- Mahidolia duque Smith, 1947 accepted as Mahidolia mystacina
- Mahidolia mystacinus (Valenciennes, 1837) accepted as Mahidolia mystacina
- Mahidolia normani Smith & Koumans, 1932 accepted as Mahidolia mystacina
- Mahidolia pagoensis Schultz, 1943 accepted as Redigobius bikolanus (Herre, 1927)
