= Sepia bartletti =

Conservation status
- Data Deficient (IUCN 3.1)

Scientific classification
- Kingdom: Animalia
- Phylum: Mollusca
- Class: Cephalopoda
- Order: Sepiida
- Family: Sepiidae
- Genus: Sepia
- Species: S. bartletti

Binomial name
- Sepia bartletti (Iredale, 1954)

Synonyms
- Blandosepia bartletti Iredale, 1954

Species of cuttlefish

Sepia bartletti is a species of cuttlefish native to the western Pacific Ocean. It is known only from the type locality. Depth range is unknown. Some authorities regard S. bartletti as a nomen dubium.

S. bartletti is known from only the holotype and six other specimens (all cuttlebones) described by Tom Iredale in 1954. It is possibly a junior synonym of Sepia bandensis. The placement of S. bartletti in the genus Sepia is also questionable.

S. bartletti grows to a mantle length of 74 mm.

The type specimen was collected in the Misima and Conflict Group of the Louisiade Archipelago, to the southeast of Papua New Guinea. It is deposited at the Australian Museum in Sydney.
