= Sepia baxteri =

Conservation status
- Data Deficient (IUCN 3.1)

Scientific classification
- Kingdom: Animalia
- Phylum: Mollusca
- Class: Cephalopoda
- Order: Sepiida
- Family: Sepiidae
- Genus: Sepia
- Species: S. baxteri

Binomial name
- Sepia baxteri (Iredale, 1940)

Synonyms
- Blandosepia baxteri Iredale, 1940

Species of cuttlefish

Sepia baxteri is a species of cuttlefish native to the southwestern Pacific Ocean, specifically the waters around Lord Howe Island. It is known only from the type cuttlebones. Depth range is unknown.

Cuttlebones of this species are known to reach at least 74 mm.

S. baxteri is possibly a junior synonym of Sepia bandensis. The placement of this species in the genus Sepia is also questionable.

The type specimen was collected near Lord Howe Island (31°33′S 159°05′E). It is deposited at the Australian Museum in Sydney.
