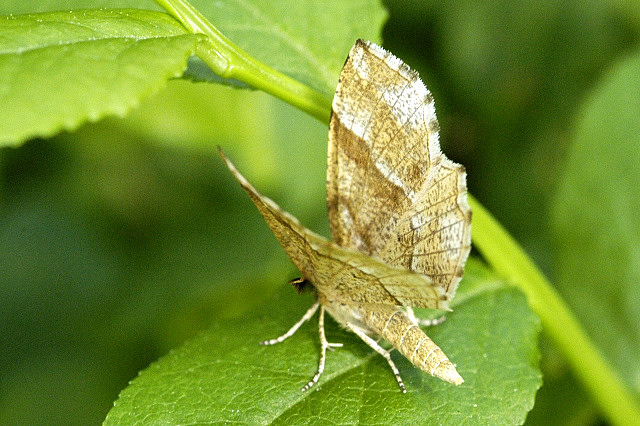
- Cepphis advenaria

Scientific classification
- Kingdom: Animalia
- Phylum: Arthropoda
- Clade: Pancrustacea
- Class: Insecta
- Order: Lepidoptera
- Family: Geometridae
- Tribe: Ourapterygini
- Genus: Cepphis; Hübner, 1823

= Cepphis =

Genus of moths

Cepphis is a genus of moths in the family Geometridae.

== Species ==
- Cepphis advenaria – little thorn (Hübner, 1790)
- Cepphis armataria – scallop moth (Herrich-Schäffer, 1855)
- Cepphis decoloraria – dark scallop moth (Hulst, 1886)
