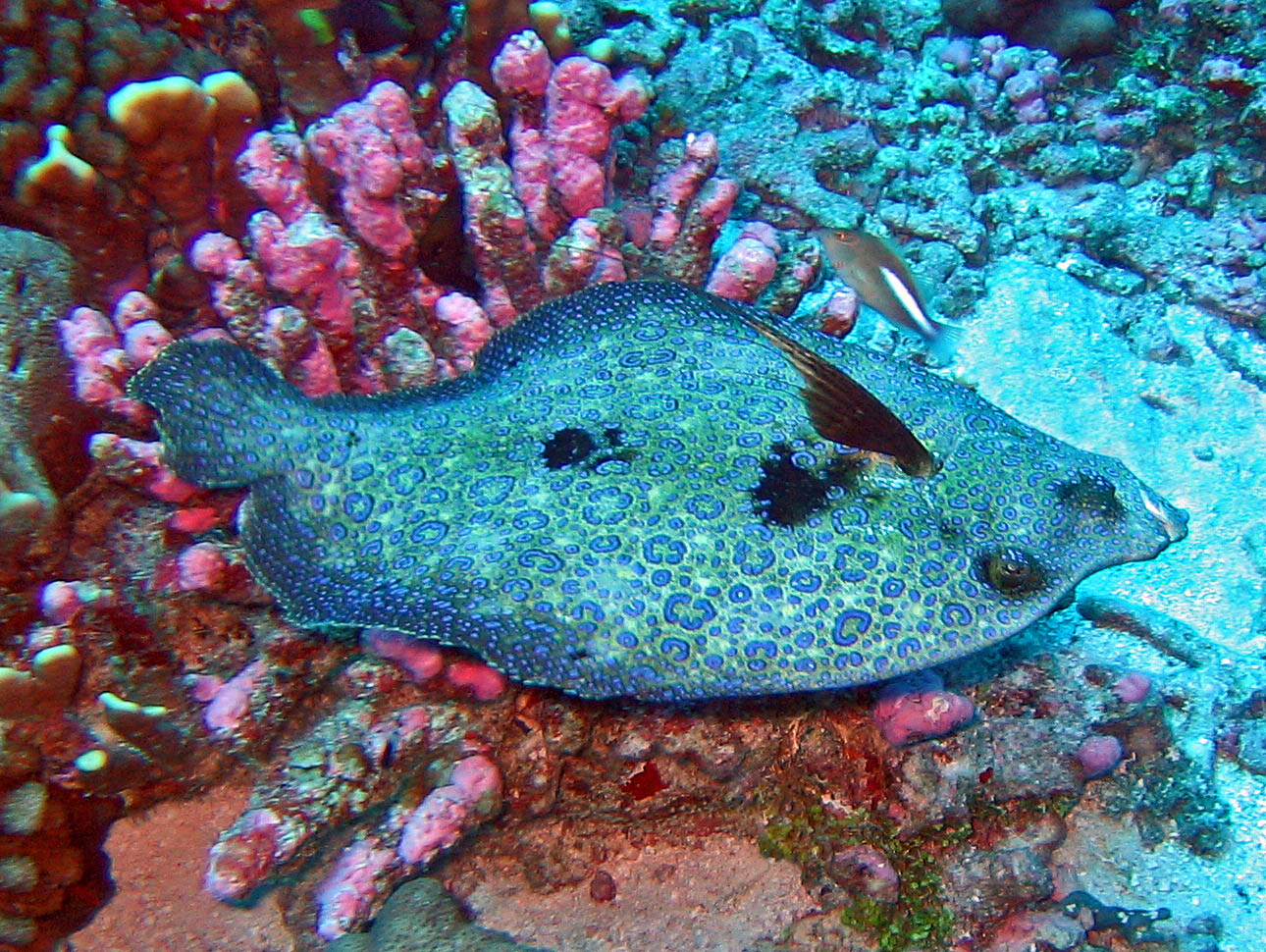
- Bothus mancus in Polynesia

Conservation status
- Least Concern (IUCN 3.1)

Scientific classification
- Kingdom: Animalia
- Phylum: Chordata
- Class: Actinopterygii
- Order: Carangiformes
- Suborder: Pleuronectoidei
- Family: Bothidae
- Genus: Bothus
- Species: B. mancus

Binomial name
- Bothus mancus (Broussonet, 1782)

= Peacock flounder =

Species of fish

The peacock flounder (Bothus mancus), also known as the flowery flounder, is a species of fish in the family Bothidae (lefteye flounders). The species is found widely in relatively shallow waters in the Indo-Pacific, also ranging into warmer parts of the East Pacific.

== Description ==
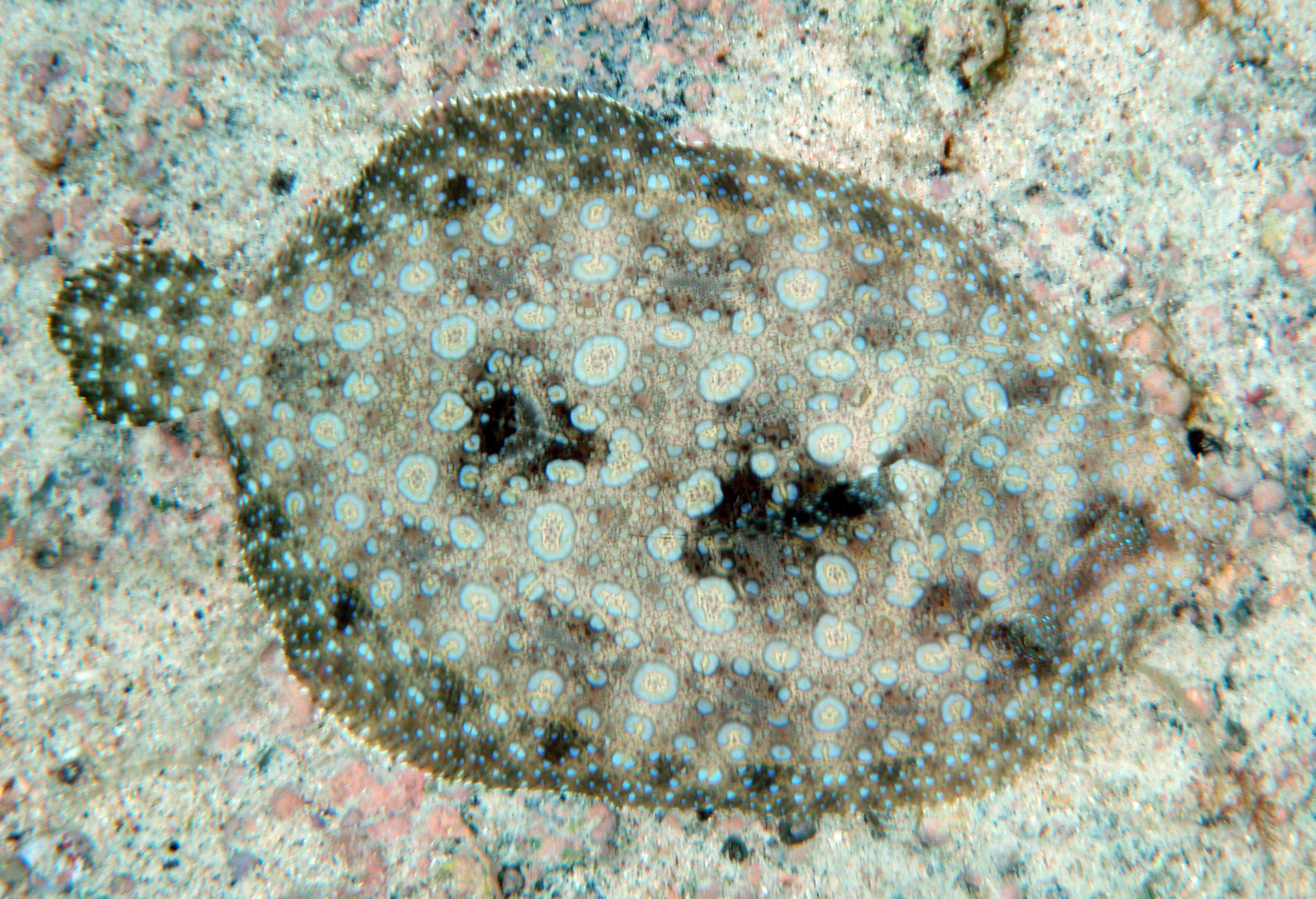
Peacock flounder

The peacock flounder is also called flowery flounder because it is covered in superficially flower-like bluish spots. As suggested by the family name, lefteye flounders have both eyes on top of the left hand side of their heads. The eyes are raised up on short stumps like radar dishes, and can move in any direction independent of each other. That feature provides flounders with a wide range of view. One eye can look forward while the other looks backward at the same time. The baby flounders have one eye on each side of their bodies like ordinary fish, and swim like other fishes do, but later on, as they undergo maturation to adulthood, the right eye moves to the left side, and flounders start to swim sideways, which gives them the ability to settle down flat on the bottom. The maximum length of this flounder is about 45 centimetres (18 in).

== Habitat ==
Peacock flounders are mostly found in shallow water on sandy bottoms. Sometimes they rest over piles of dead corals or bare rock. They may be found as deep as 150 meters (490 ft).

== Behavior ==
=== Diet ===
As most flounders, the peacock flounder is mainly nocturnal, but is sometimes also active during the day. It hunts for small fish, crabs and shrimp.

=== Reproduction ===
Peacock flounders breed in late winter and early spring. After the female releases two to three million eggs, males fertilize them. The fertilized eggs float close to the surface, carried by the currents, and hatch in 15 days. Before hatching the eggs sink to the bottom. For the next four to six months baby flounders float in the open ocean, sometimes hundreds of miles from the place the eggs were released and hatched. During those months the right eye of the juvenile slowly moves to the left side.

== Color change ==
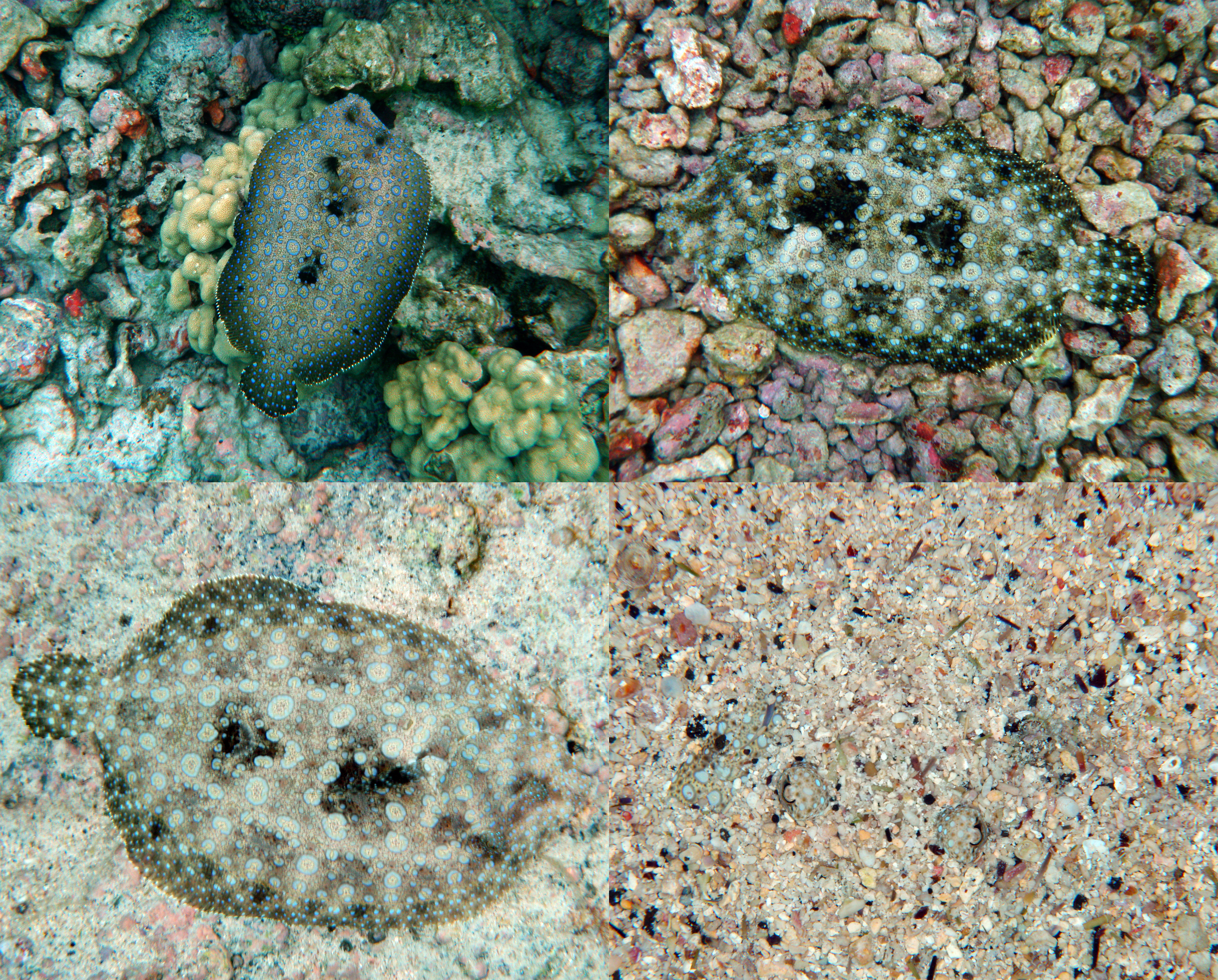
Four frames of the same fish taken a few minutes apart showing the ability of flounders to change colors to match the surroundings

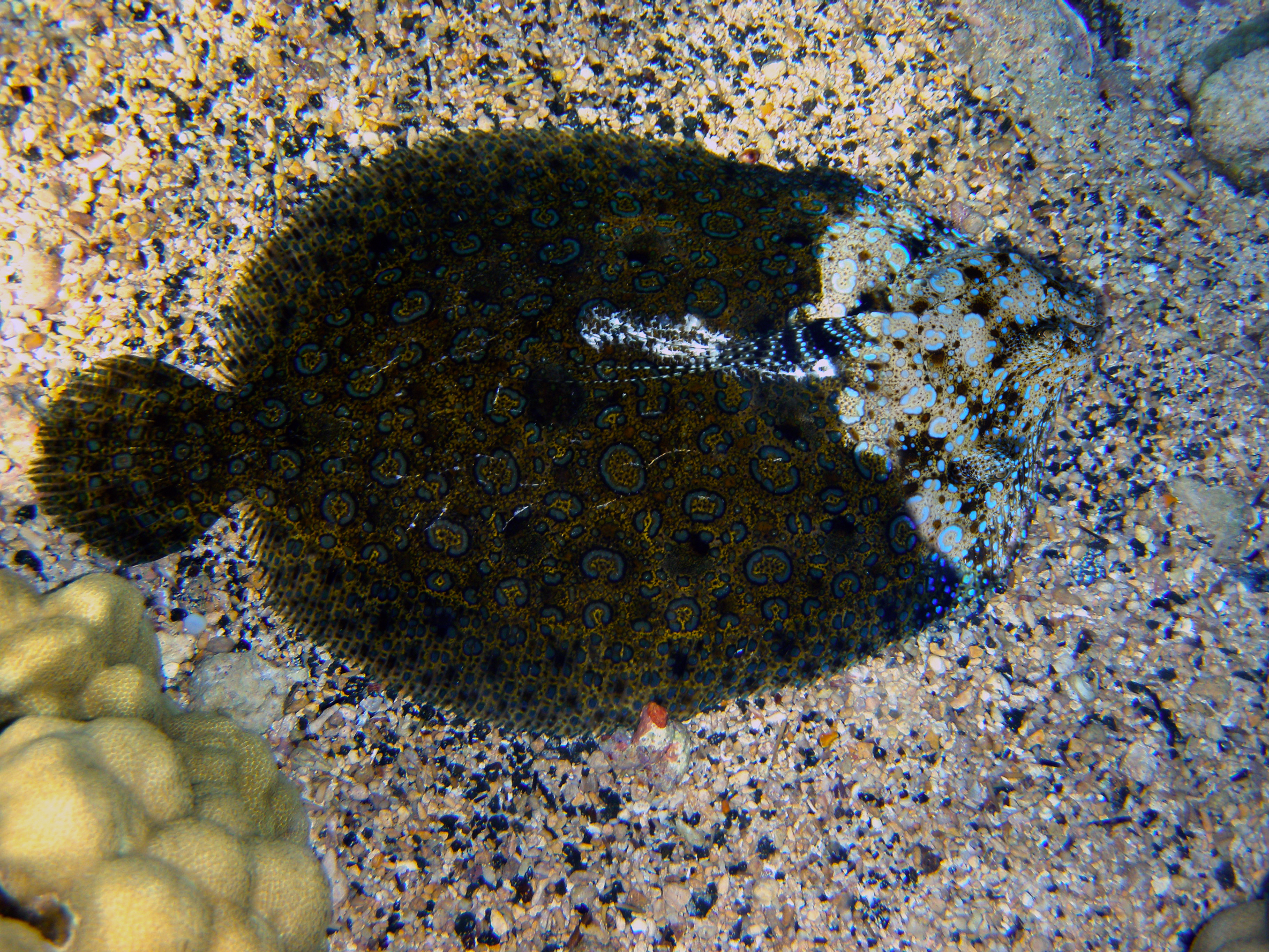
If one of the eyes is damaged or covered by sand, flounders have difficulties in matching their colors to the surroundings

Like all flounders, peacock flounders are masters of camouflage. They use cryptic coloration to avoid being detected by both prey and predators. Whenever possible rather than swim they crawl on their fins along the bottom while constantly changing colors and patterns. In a study, peacock flounders demonstrated the ability to change colors in just eight seconds. They were even able to match the pattern of a checkerboard they were placed on. The changing of the colors is an extremely complex and not well understood process. It involves the flounder's vision and hormones. The flounders match the colors of the surface by releasing different pigments to the surface of the skin cells while leaving some of the cells white by sequestering those pigments. If one of the flounder's eyes is damaged or covered by sand, the flounders have difficulties in matching their colors to their surroundings. When hunting or hiding from predators, the flounders bury themselves in the sand, leaving only the eyes protruding.
