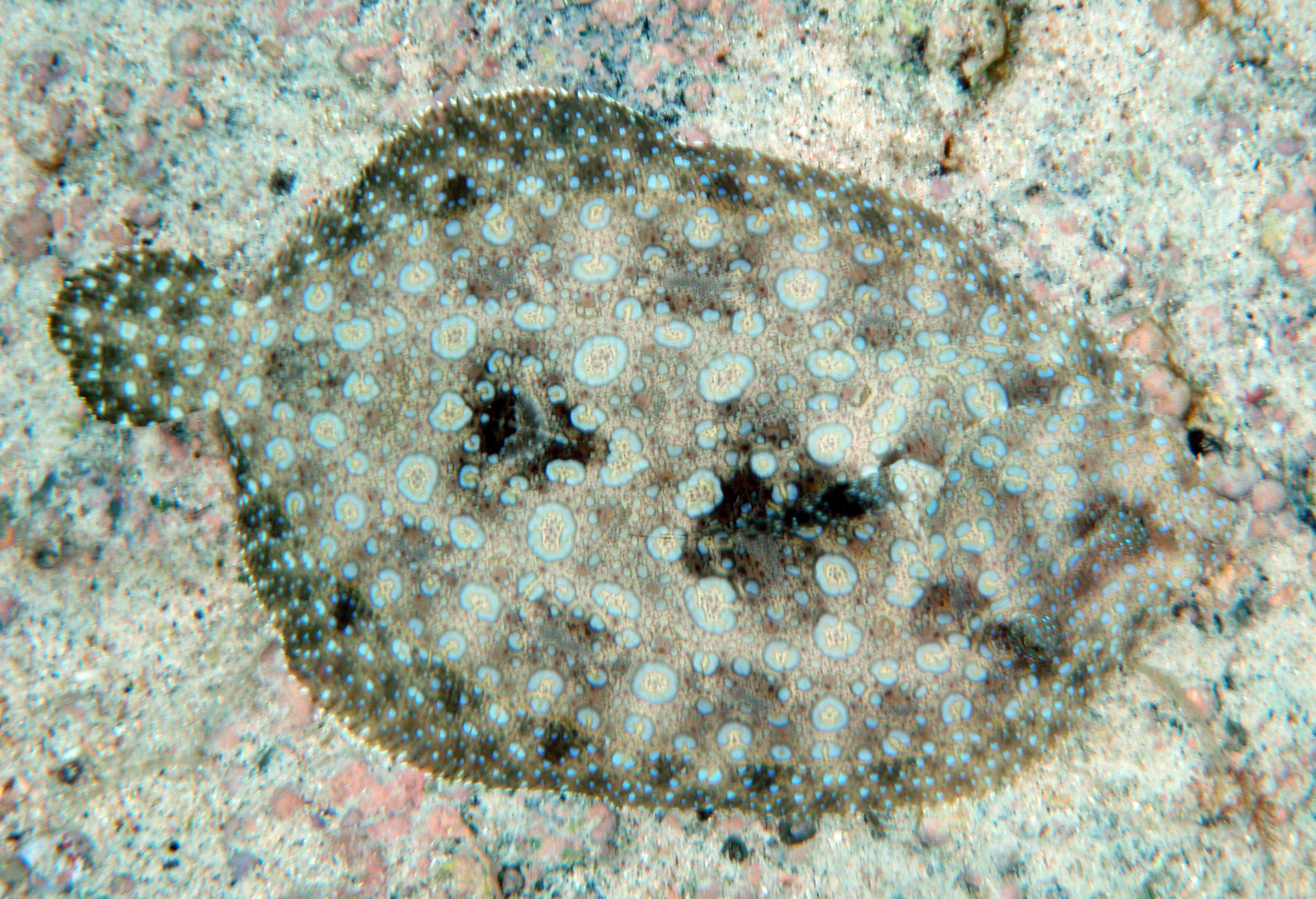
- B. mancus

Scientific classification
- Kingdom: Animalia
- Phylum: Chordata
- Class: Actinopterygii
- Order: Carangiformes
- Suborder: Pleuronectoidei
- Family: Bothidae
- Genus: Bothus; Rafinesque, 1810

Type species
- Bothus rumolo Rafinesque, 1810

Species
- See text

= Bothus =

Bothus Temporal range: Middle Miocene–present

Genus of fishes

Bothus is a genus of flatfish in the family Bothidae (lefteye flounders) from the Pacific, Indian and Atlantic Oceans. Some species in this genus have spots consisting of blue rings.

== Species ==
There are currently 17 recognized species in this genus:

- Bothus assimilis (Günther, 1862)
- Bothus constellatus (D. S. Jordan, 1889) (Pacific eyed flounder)
- Bothus ellipticus (Poey, 1860)
- Bothus guibei Stauch, 1966 (Guinean flounder)
- Bothus leopardinus (Günther, 1862) (Pacific leopard flounder)
- Bothus lunatus (Linnaeus, 1758) (Plate fish)
- Bothus maculiferus (Poey, 1860) (Mottled flounder)
- Bothus mancus (Broussonet, 1782) (Flowery flounder)
- Bothus mellissi Norman, 1931 (St. Helena flounder)
- Bothus myriaster (Temminck & Schlegel, 1846) (Indo-Pacific oval flounder)
- Bothus ocellatus (Agassiz, 1831) (Eyed flounder)
- Bothus pantherinus (Rüppell, 1830) (Leopard flounder)
- Bothus podas (Delaroche, 1809) (Wide-eyed flounder)
- Bothus robinsi Topp & F. H. Hoff, 1972 (Twospot flounder)
- Bothus swio Hensley, 1997
- Bothus tricirrhitus Kotthaus, 1977
- Bothus ypsigrammus Kotthaus, 1977

The following fossil species are also known:

- †?Bothus bhubanicus Tiwari & Bannikov, 2001 (Early Miocene of Mizoram, India)
- †Bothus isselburgensis Schwarzhans & van der Hocht, 2023 (Late Miocene of Germany) [otolith]
- †Bothus parvulus (Kramberger, 1883) (Middle Miocene of Croatia)
