= Checked goby =

Conservation status
- Least Concern (IUCN 3.1)

Scientific classification
- Kingdom: Animalia
- Phylum: Chordata
- Class: Actinopterygii
- Order: Gobiiformes
- Family: Oxudercidae
- Genus: Redigobius
- Species: R. dewaali

Binomial name
- Redigobius dewaali (M. C. W. Weber, 1897)

Synonyms
- Gobius dewaali M. C. W. Weber, 1897; Redigobius dewaalii (M. C. W. Weber, 1897); Stigmatogobius dewaali (M. C. W. Weber, 1897); Gobius maxillaris Davies, 1948; Mugilogobius pongolensis Kok & Blaber, 1977; Redigobius pongolensis (Kok & Blaber, 1977)

Species of fish

Redigobius dewaali, the checked goby, is a species of goby native to the Indian Ocean coast of Africa from Mozambique and South Africa. This species inhabits fresh and brackish waters of estuaries, lakes and floodplain pans where there is plentiful vegetation. It can reach a length of 4.2 centimetres (1.7 in) SL.
