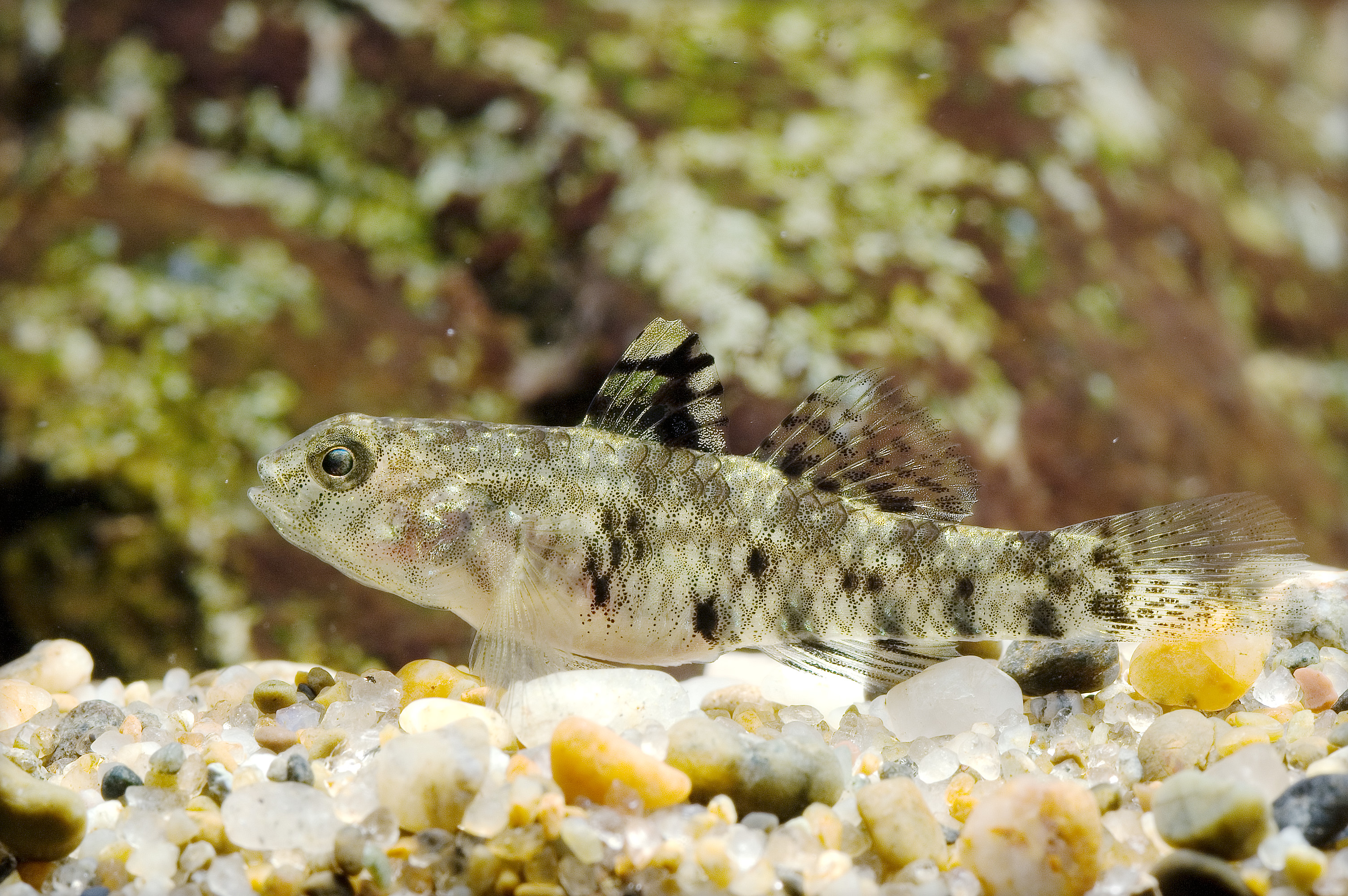

Conservation status
- Least Concern (IUCN 3.1)

Scientific classification
- Kingdom: Animalia
- Phylum: Chordata
- Class: Actinopterygii
- Order: Gobiiformes
- Family: Oxudercidae
- Genus: Redigobius
- Species: R. bikolanus

Binomial name
- Redigobius bikolanus (Herre, 1927)

Synonyms
- Vaimosa bikolana Herre, 1927; Pseudogobius bikolanus (Herre, 1927); Gobius flavescens De Vis, 1884 (Ambiguous name); Parvigobius immeritus Whitley, 1930; Vaimosa osgoodi Herre, 1935; Vaimosa montalbani Herre, 1936; Gobius johnstoniensis Koumans, 1940; Mahidolia pagoensis L. P. Schultz, 1943; Vaimosa novaehebudorum Fowler, 1944; Stigmatogobius minutus Takagi, 1957; Stigmatogobius versicolor J. L. B. Smith, 1959; Redigobius versicolor (J. L. B. Smith, 1959)

= Redigobius bikolanus =

Species of fish

Redigobius bikolanus, the speckled goby or bigmouth goby, is a species of goby native to marine, fresh and brackish waters along the coasts of Asia from Japan to Australia out to the Pacific islands of New Caledonia and Vanuatu and along the coast of South Africa and the Seychelles. This species inhabits streams, creeks and estuaries, often being found upstream beyond the tidal zones of rivers. This fish can reach a length of 4.2 centimetres (1.7 in) SL.
