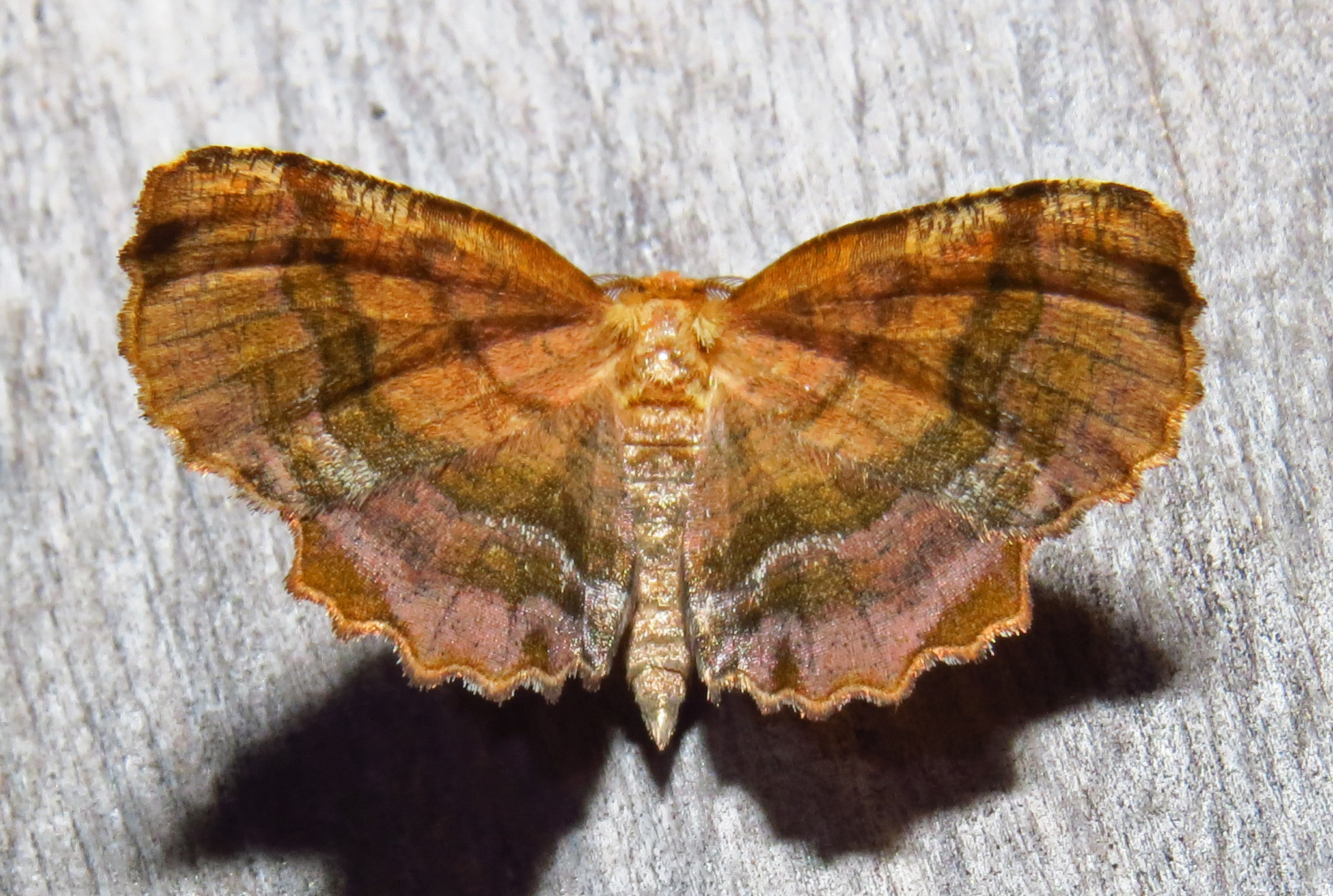

Scientific classification
- Domain: Eukaryota
- Kingdom: Animalia
- Phylum: Arthropoda
- Class: Insecta
- Order: Lepidoptera
- Family: Geometridae
- Genus: Cepphis
- Species: C. armataria

Binomial name
- Cepphis armataria (Herrich-Schäffer, 1855)

= Cepphis armataria =

Species of moth

Cepphis armataria, the scallop moth, is a species of geometrid moth in the family Geometridae. It is found in North America.

The MONA or Hodges number for Cepphis armataria is 6835.
