= Mosquito hawk =

Mosquito hawk can mean:

- Chuck-will's-widow
- Crane fly
- Damselfly
- Dragonfly
- A type of fishing fly
