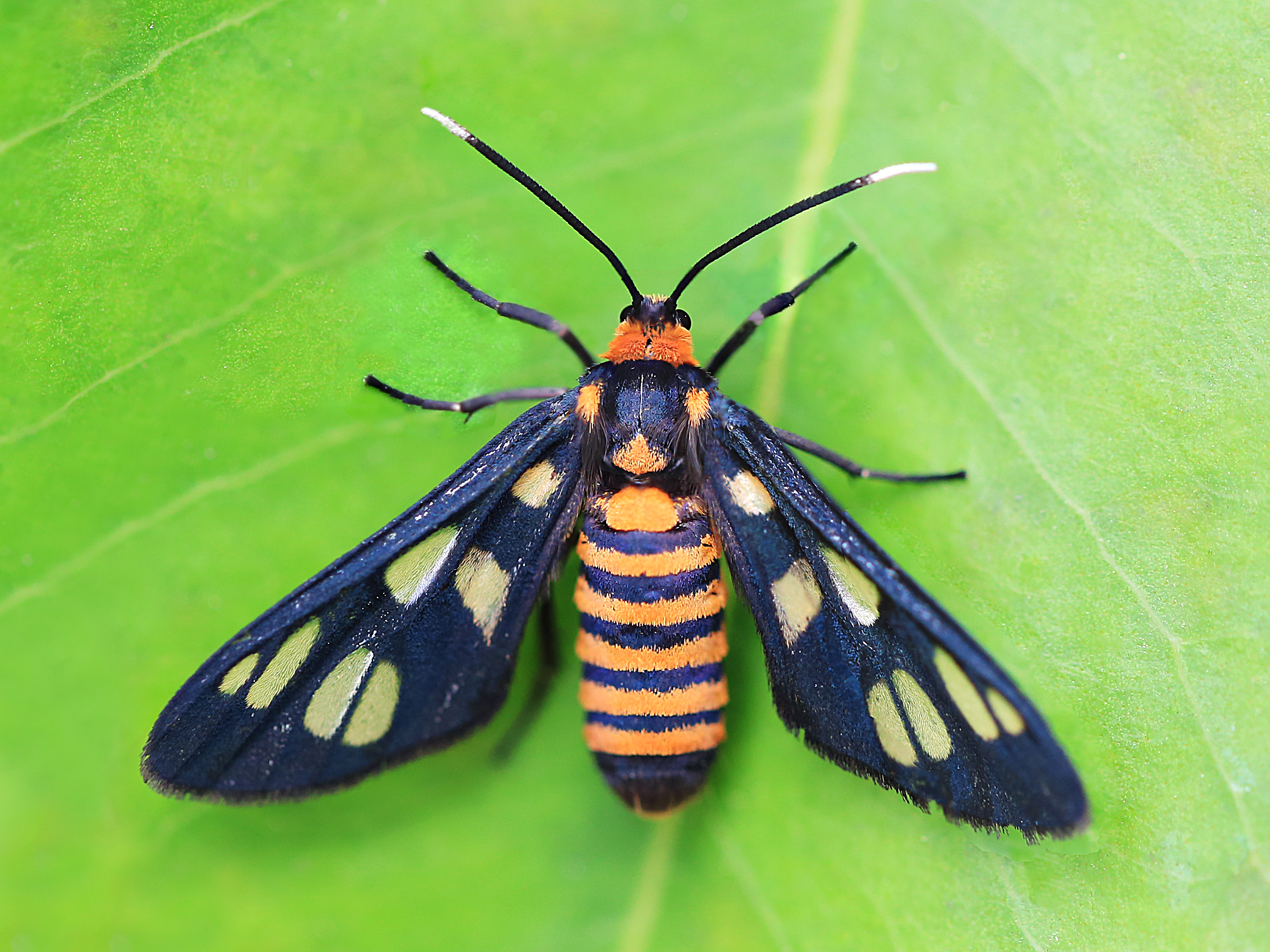

Scientific classification
- Domain: Eukaryota
- Kingdom: Animalia
- Phylum: Arthropoda
- Class: Insecta
- Order: Lepidoptera
- Superfamily: Noctuoidea
- Family: Erebidae
- Subfamily: Arctiinae
- Genus: Amata
- Species: A. huebneri

Binomial name
- Amata huebneri (Boisduval, 1829)

Synonyms
- Syntomis hübneri Boisduval, 1829; Syntomis marsdeni Moore, 1859; Syntomis xanthomela Walker, 1860; Naclia cingulata Wallengren, 1860; Buthysia sangaris Wallengren, 1863; Syntomis contermina Walker, [1865]; Hydrusa pyrrhodera Meyrick, 1886; Syntomis frustulenta Swinhoe, 1892; Syntomis sala Swinhoe, 1902

= Amata huebneri =

Species of moth

Amata huebneri, commonly known as Hübner's Wasp Moth, is a species of moth in the family Erebidae (subfamily Arctiinae - "woolly bears" or "tiger moths"). The species was first described by Jean Baptiste Boisduval in 1829. It is found from the Indo Australian tropics to northern Australia.

Adults are black with yellow bands across the abdomen, and transparent windows in the wings. It is a wasp mimic.

The larvae have been recorded feeding on Oryza sativa, Mikania micrantha, Oxalis barrelieri and Ipomoea batatas.
