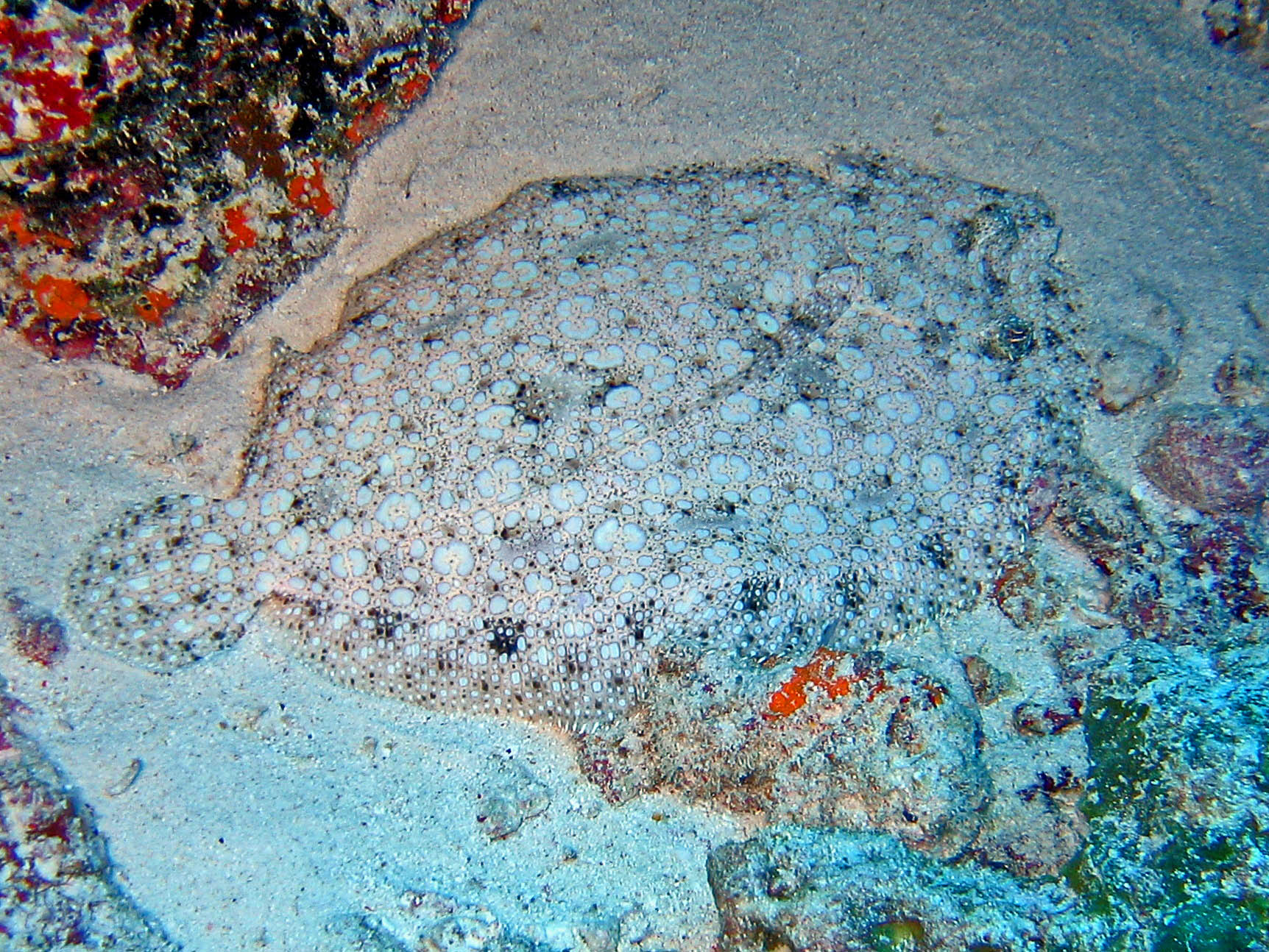
- Bothus pantherinus in Polynesia

Conservation status
- Least Concern (IUCN 3.1)

Scientific classification
- Kingdom: Animalia
- Phylum: Chordata
- Class: Actinopterygii
- Order: Carangiformes
- Suborder: Pleuronectoidei
- Family: Bothidae
- Genus: Bothus
- Species: B. pantherinus

Binomial name
- Bothus pantherinus (Rüppell, 1830)

Synonyms
- Passer marchionessarum Valenciennes, 1846; Platophrys pantherinus (Rüppell, 1830); Rhomboidichthys pantherinus (Rüppell, 1830); Rhombus pantherinus Rüppell, 1830

= Leopard flounder =

Species of fish

The leopard flounder (Bothus pantherinus) or panther flounder, is a flatfish found in the Pacific and Indian Oceans.

== Range ==
Bothus pantherinus is found in the Red Sea and Persian Gulf to South Africa, as far as southeast Australia and Japan.

== Description ==
The leopard flounder is a highly compressed fish up to 39 centimeters (15 in) long, one of the lefteye flounders, meaning that the right eye has migrated to the left side of the body. The eyed side shows dark spots, blotches and rings. One broader dark blotch is located on middle of the straight section of the lateral line. The male has an elongate pectoral fin which signals in courtship or territorial displays and when alarmed.

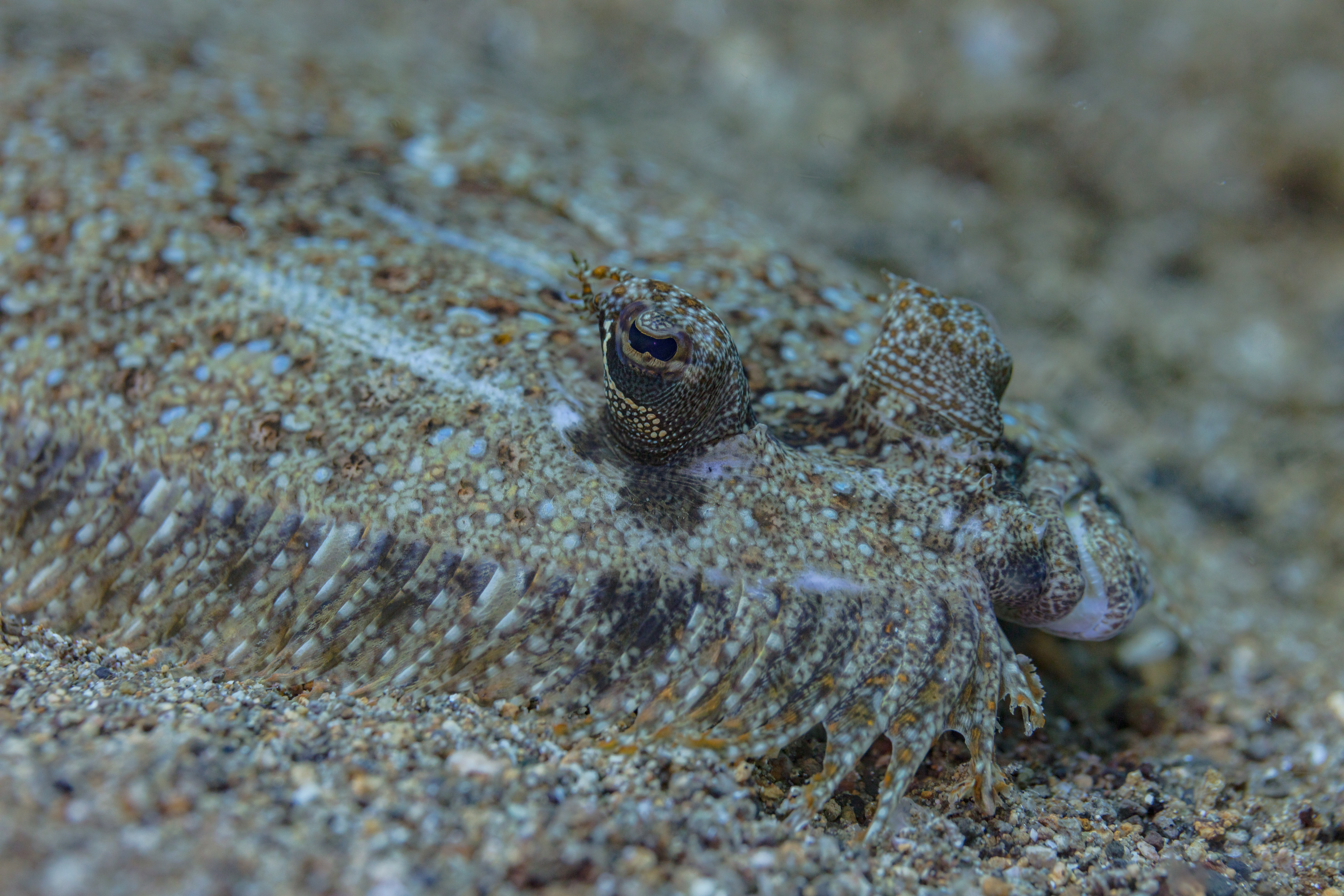
Detail

Leopard flounders use color to camouflage themselves. Bothus pantherinus takes on dull, spotted coloring to blend in with the rocky seafloor. It waits for its prey to swim by. Other times the flounder turns an almost see-through color to avoid predators when swimming near the surface.

== Habitat ==
Leopard flounder is a benthic species living on the bottom of a sea. It inhabits sandy or silty sand, and muddy bottoms of inner reef flats. It is often partially buried in or on the sand of lagoons, bays and sheltered reefs, at a depth of 3–150 metres (9.8–492.1 ft).
