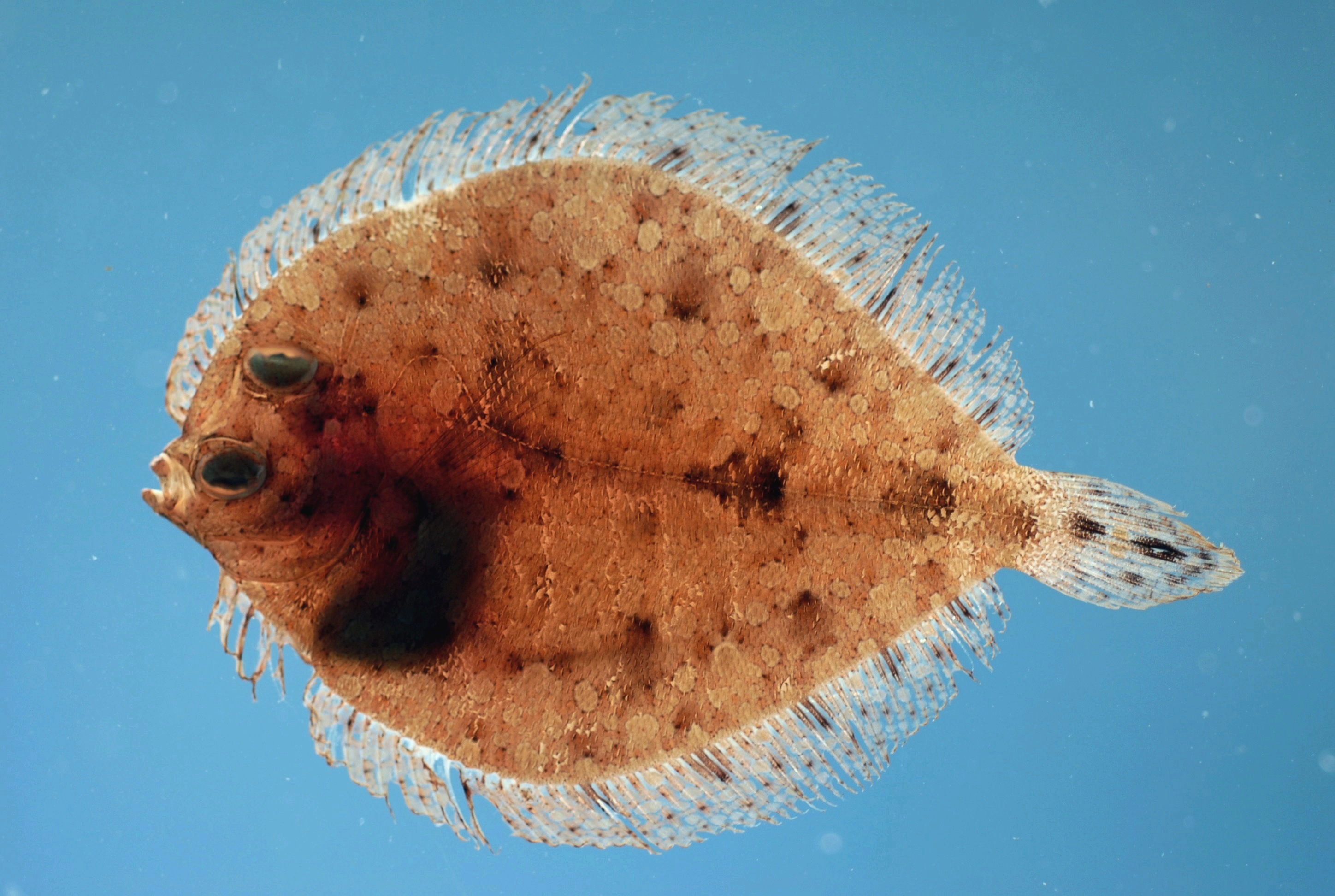

Conservation status
- Least Concern (IUCN 3.1)

Scientific classification
- Kingdom: Animalia
- Phylum: Chordata
- Class: Actinopterygii
- Order: Carangiformes
- Suborder: Pleuronectoidei
- Family: Bothidae
- Genus: Bothus
- Species: B. robinsi

Binomial name
- Bothus robinsi Topp & F. H. Hoff, 1972

= Twospot flounder =

Species of fish

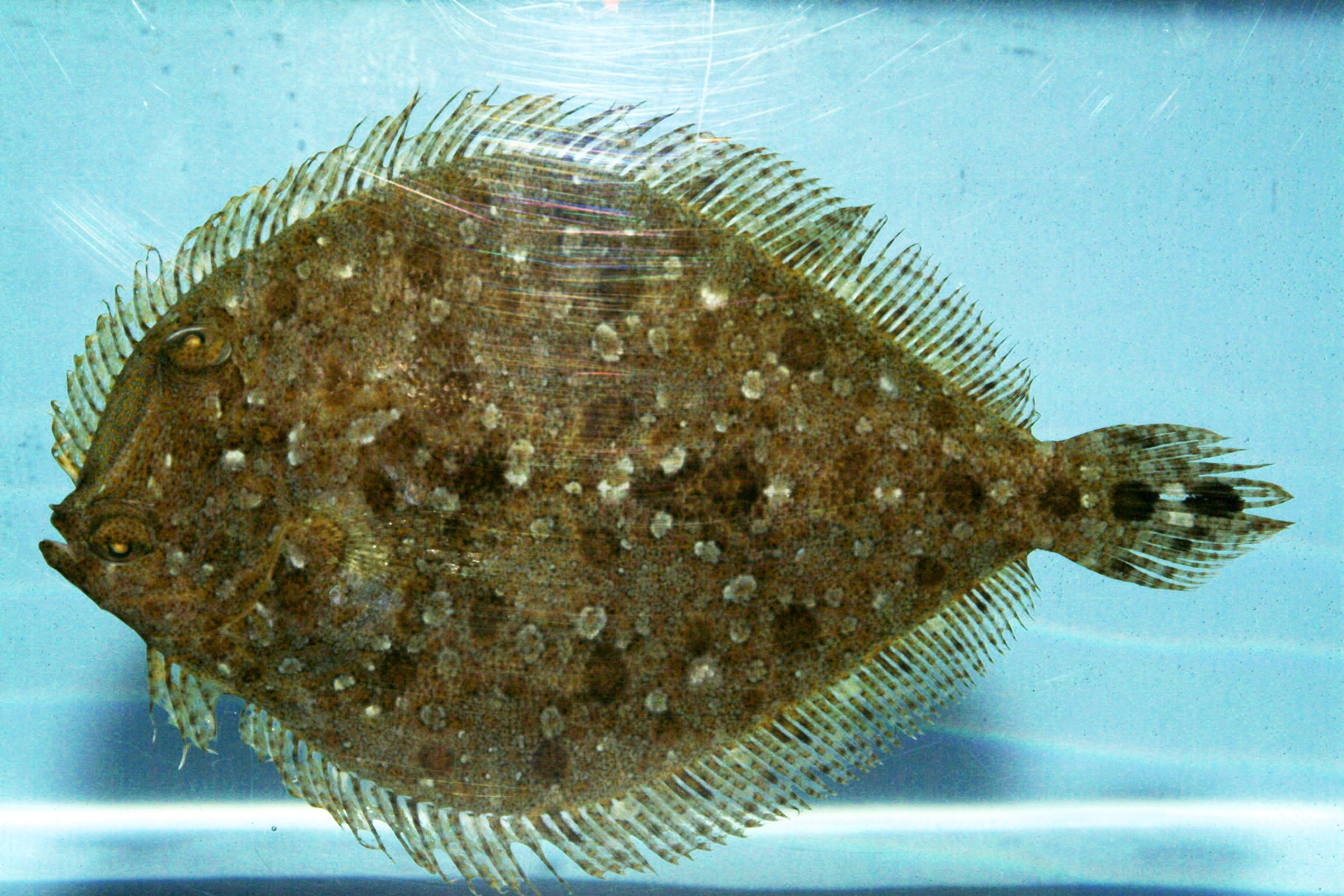
Twospot flounder ( Bothus robinsi )

The twospot flounder (Bothus robinsi) is a species of lefteye flounder native to the western Atlantic Ocean along the American coast from New York, United States to Brazil where it is mostly found at depths of from 10 to 50 metres (33 to 164 ft), sometimes recorded to a depth of 90 metres (300 ft). This species grows to a length of 25 centimetres (9.8 in) TL, though most do not exceed 18 centimetres (7.1 in) TL. This species is of minor importance to local commercial fisheries.
