= Laem Sing district =

Laem Sing แหลมสิงห์
- District
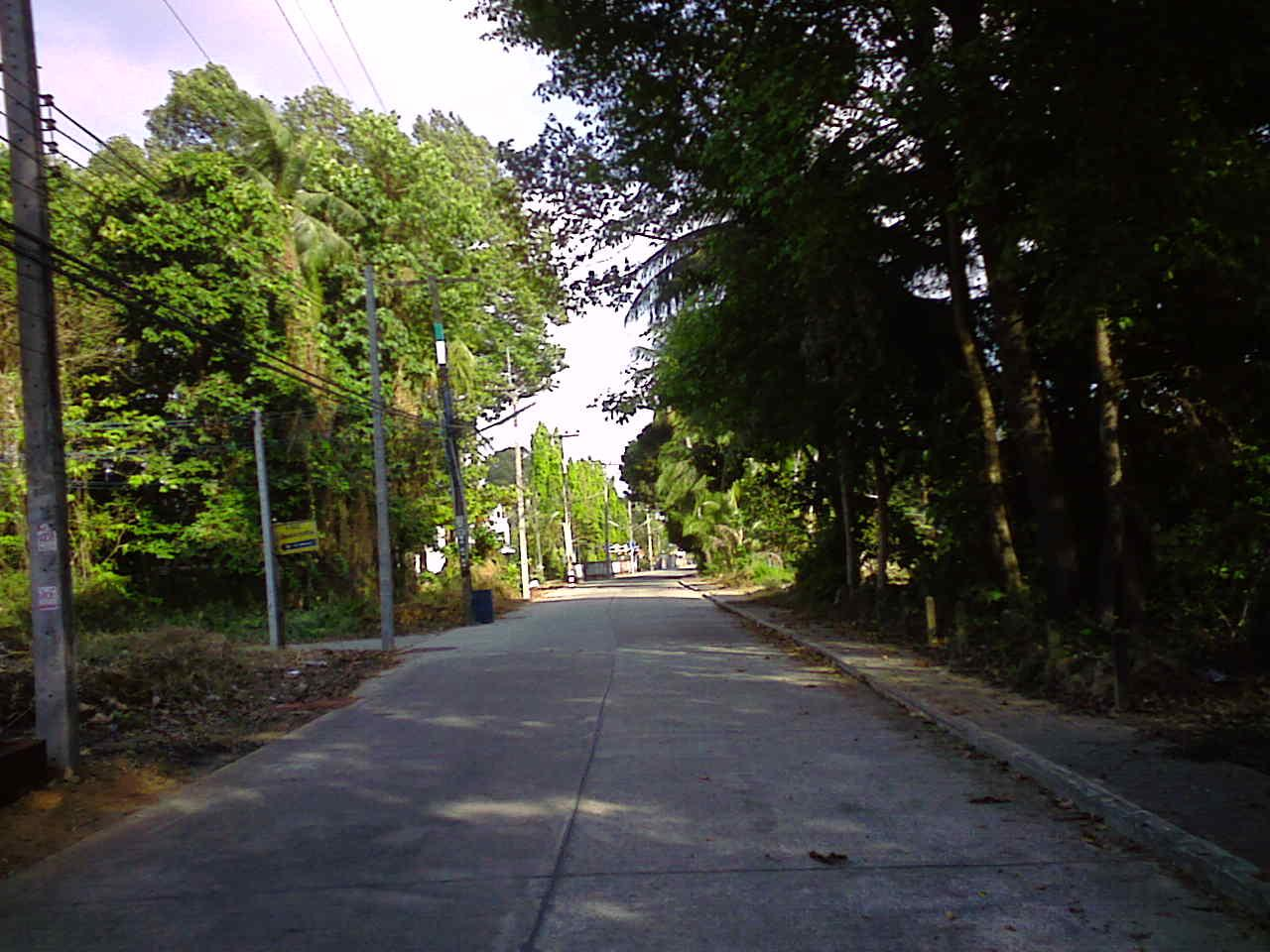
- Shady atmosphere of Laem Sing District

- District location in Chanthaburi province
- Coordinates: 12°28′54″N 102°4′25″E
- Country: Thailand
- Province: Chanthaburi
- Seat: Pak Nam Laem Sing

Area
  - Total: 190.8 km^{2} (73.7 sq mi)

Population (2005)
  - Total: 30,790
  - Density: 161.4/km^{2} (418/sq mi)
- Time zone: UTC+7 (ICT)
- Postal code: 22130
- Geocode: 2206

Laem Sing (Thai: แหลมสิงห์, pronounced [lɛ̌ːm sǐŋ]) is a district (amphoe) of Chanthaburi province, eastern Thailand.

== History ==
Laem Sing district was created in 1898, then named Phlio District. In 1909 the government allocated budget for the new district office, and they changed the district name to Laem Sing. The district office was re-built in 1966 and 1996.

The estuary in the district is one of two river mouths that Walailak Songsiri allows for Po Ssu Lan, the polity named in Chinese records of the early 13th century as the south-eastern neighbour of Chen Li Fu; the other is Khaem Nu, further along the same coast. O. W. Wolters had identified Po Ssu Lan with Chanthabun, the older name of the provincial town.

== Geography ==
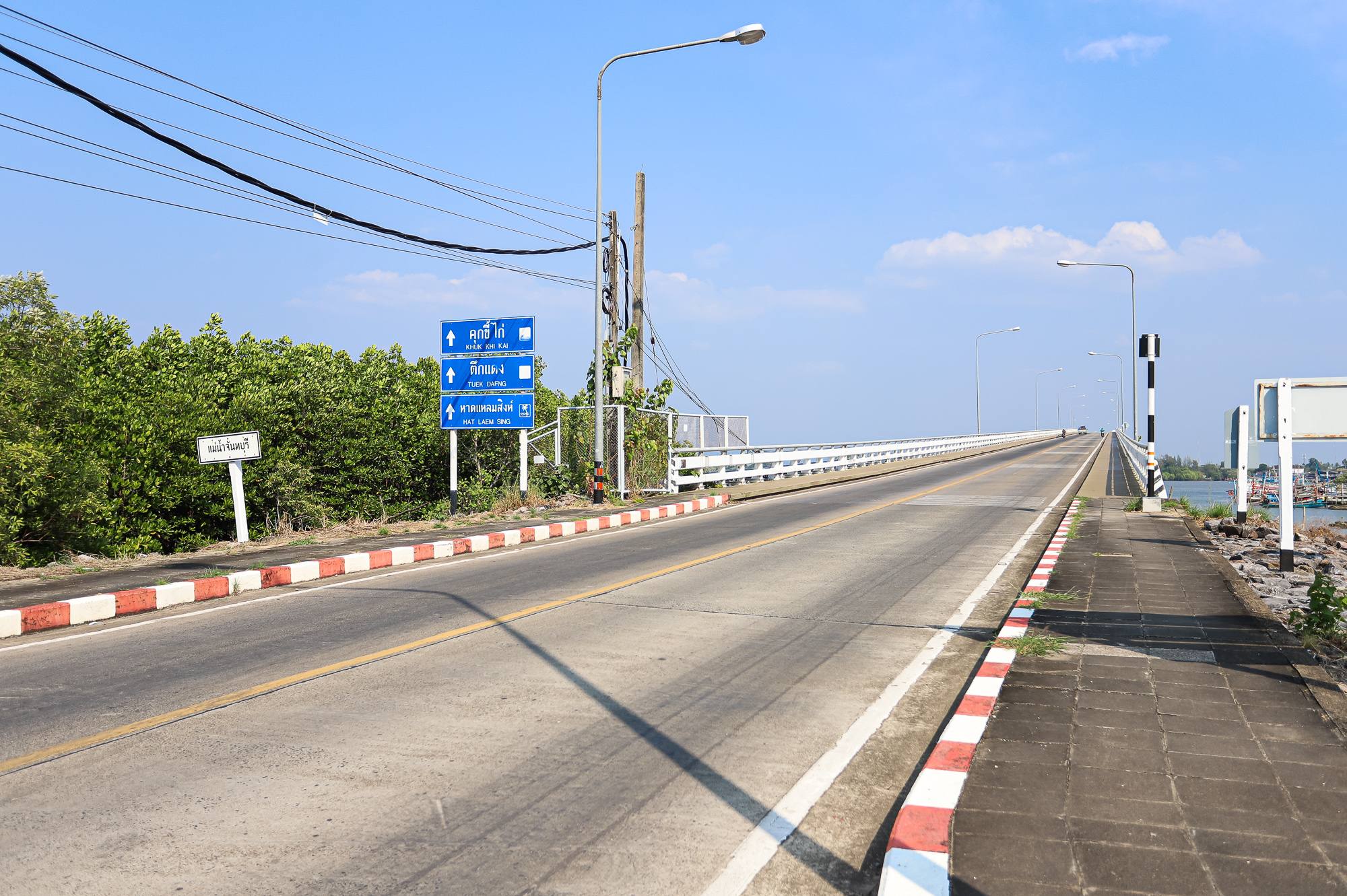
Taksin Maharat Bridge crosses the Chanthaburi river at Bang Kachai

Neighboring districts are (from the northwest clockwise) Tha Mai, Mueang Chanthaburi, and Khlung of Chanthaburi Province. To the southwest is the Gulf of Thailand.

To the southeast of the district is the estuary of the Chanthaburi River. It covers about 27 km^{2} of the shallow tidal water area, it contains extensive mudflats and mangrove forests.

== Administration ==
The district is divided into seven sub-districts (tambons), which are further subdivided into 65 villages (mubans). There are two townships (thesaban tambons): Pak Nam Laem Sing covers the same-named tambon, and Phlio covers tambon Phlio and Khlong Nam Khem. There are a further five tambon administrative organizations (TAO).

No.	Name	Thai name	Villages	Pop.
1.	Pak Nam Laem Sing	ปากน้ำแหลมสิงห์	16	9,220
2.	Ko Proet	เกาะเปริด	7	3,419
3.	Nong Chim	หนองชิ่ม	10	5,314
4.	Phlio	พลิ้ว	12	5,226
5.	Khlong Nam Khem	คลองน้ำเค็ม	6	1,555
6.	Bang Sa Kao	บางสระเก้า	5	2,230
7.	Bang Kachai	บางกะไชย	9	3,826
