= Chameleon shrimp =

The term chameleon shrimp may refer to several species:

- Calliasmata pholidota, a true shrimp
- Hippolyte varians, a true shrimp
- Praunus flexuosus, an opossum shrimp
- Other species of families Hippolytidae and Barbouriidae
