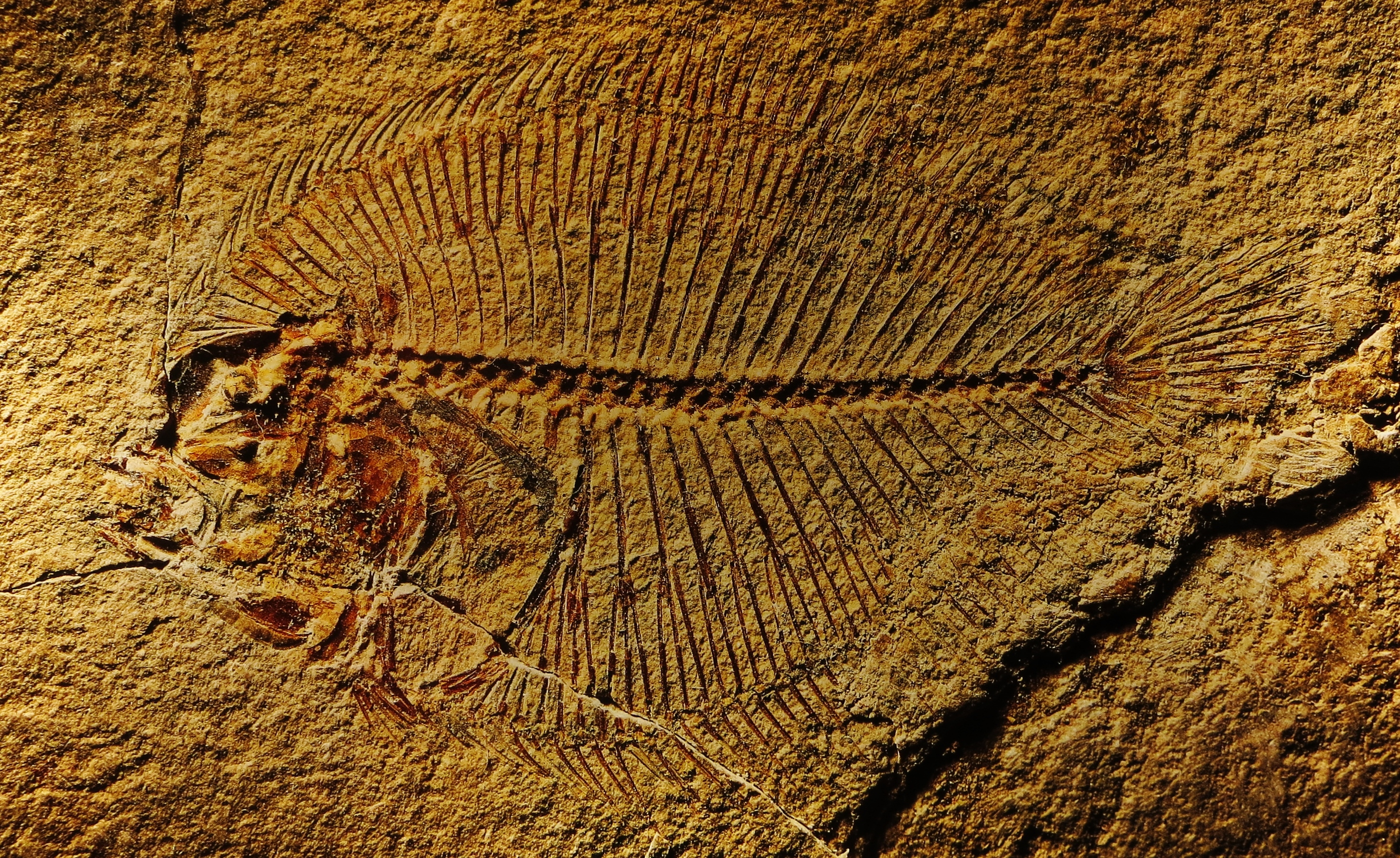
- Fossil of E. minimus, Museo dei Fossili di Bolca

Scientific classification
- Domain: Eukaryota
- Kingdom: Animalia
- Phylum: Chordata
- Class: Actinopterygii
- Order: Carangiformes
- Suborder: Pleuronectoidei
- Genus: †Eobothus; Eastman, 1914

Type species
- †Rhombus minimus Agassiz, 1839

Species
- E. minimus (Agassiz, 1839); ?E. singhi Sahni & Choudhary, 1971; ?E. vialovi Berg, 1941

= Eobothus =

Eobothus Temporal range: Early Eocene

Extinct genus of fishes

Eobothus ('dawn Bothus') is an extinct genus of very small, fossil marine flatfish known from the Eocene. It is one of the oldest flatfish known from fossil remains.

It contains a single definitive species, E. minimus (Agassiz, 1839) from the Early Eocene-aged Monte Bolca site of Italy. This species was initially erroneously described by Volta (1796) as a fossil specimen of the European plaice (synonym Pleuronectes quadratulus), and later officially described as Rhombus minimus by Agassiz in 1839. It was moved to its own genus, Eobothus, in 1914. In addition, two dubious fossil genera are also known: E. singhi Sahni & Choudhary, 1971 from the early Eocene of Rajasthan, India (Kapurdi Formation) and E. vialovi Berg, 1941 from the Middle Eocene of Uzbekistan. However, these species may not belong to this genus, or even be flatfish at all.

Eobothus is significant as one of the earliest genera of flatfish, one of the last major fish groups to evolve. It closely resembled modern flatfish, with an oval-shaped body about 10 centimetres (4 in) long, surrounded by elongated dorsal and anal fins. In the adult, the eyes were both located on the left side of the head, as in modern species, and the fish would have lain flat against the seafloor on its right side. This was an evolutionary advance from the more primitive Eocene flatfishes Heteronectes and Amphistium, in which the eyes only partially migrated.

It is sometimes placed in the Bothidae, as its name suggests, but more recent studies have found such a classification to be inconclusive, and it is thus now placed as an indeterminate flatfish. Some studies have found it to be a basal member of the superfamily Pleuronectoidea.
