= Lepidoblepharon =

Scientific classification
- Kingdom: Animalia
- Phylum: Chordata
- Class: Actinopterygii
- Division: Teleostei
- Order: Carangiformes
- Suborder: Pleuronectoidei
- Family: Citharidae
- Genus: Lepidoblepharon; M. C. W. Weber, 1913
- Species: L. ophthalmolepis

Binomial name
- Lepidoblepharon ophthalmolepis M. C. W. Weber, 1913

Species of fish

Lepidoblepharon ophthalmolepis, the scale-eyed flounder, is a species of citharid flounder found in the western Pacific Ocean, where it is found at depths from 310 to 428 m (1,017 to 1,404 ft). This species grows to a total length of 36 cm (14 in). This species is the only known member of its genus.
