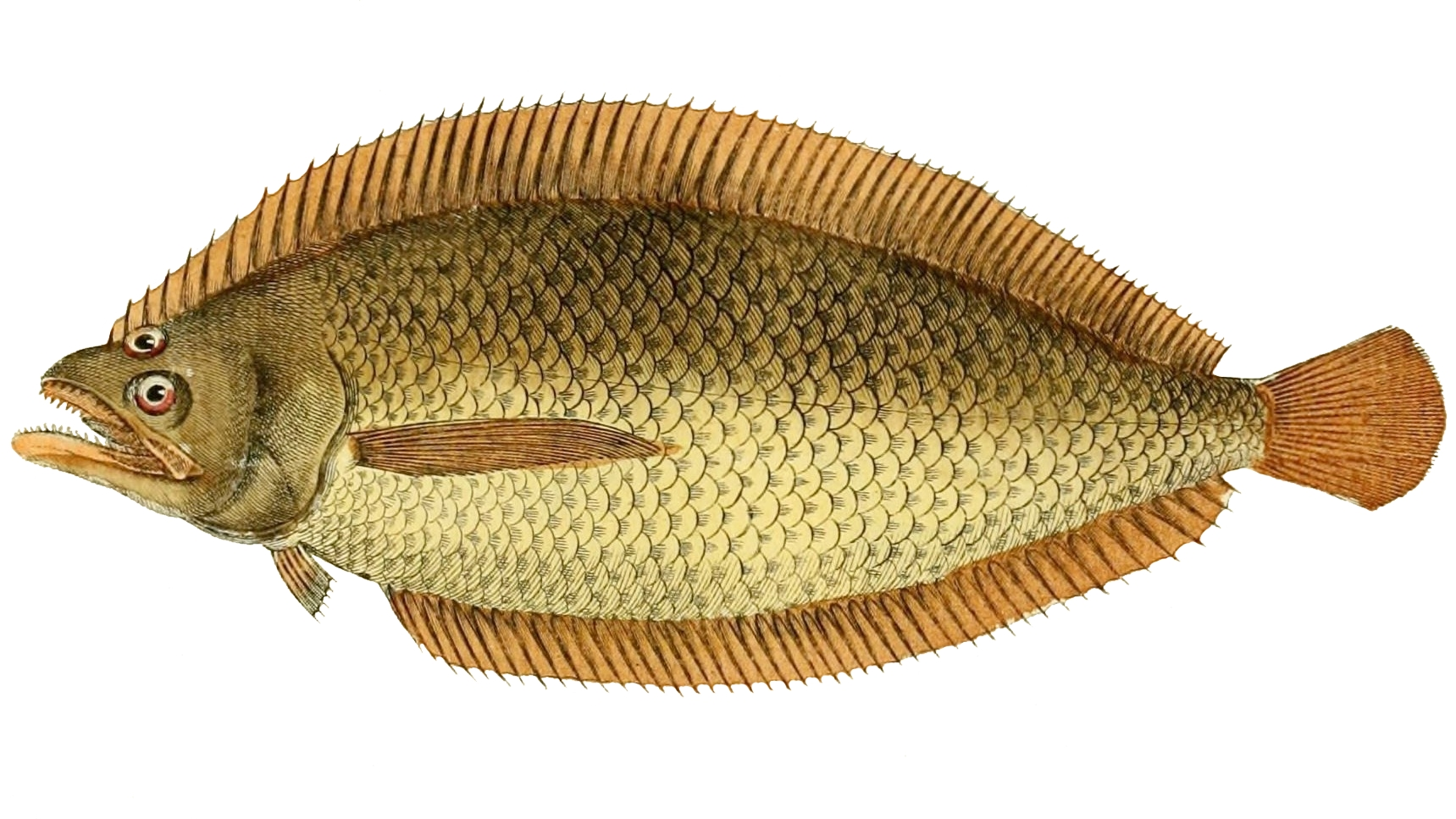

Conservation status
- Least Concern (IUCN 3.1)

Scientific classification
- Kingdom: Animalia
- Phylum: Chordata
- Class: Actinopterygii
- Order: Carangiformes
- Suborder: Pleuronectoidei
- Family: Citharidae
- Genus: Citharus; Artedi, 1793
- Species: C. linguatula

Binomial name
- Citharus linguatula (Linnaeus, 1758)

Synonyms
- Citharus macrolepidotus (Bloch, 1787); Pleuronectes citharus Spinola, 1807; Pleuronectes linguatula Linnaeus, 1758; Pleuronectes macrolepidotus Bloch, 1787; Pleuronectes patarachia Nardo, 1847

= Citharus =

Species of fish

Citharus linguatula, the spotted flounder or Atlantic spotted flounder, is a species of fish in the Citharidae, a family of flounders. It is native to the eastern Atlantic Ocean (off northwest Africa) and the Mediterranean Sea, where it is found to a depth of 300 m (980 ft). This species grows to a total length of 30 cm (12 in) . It is of minor importance to local commercial fisheries. This species is the only known member of its monotypic genus.
