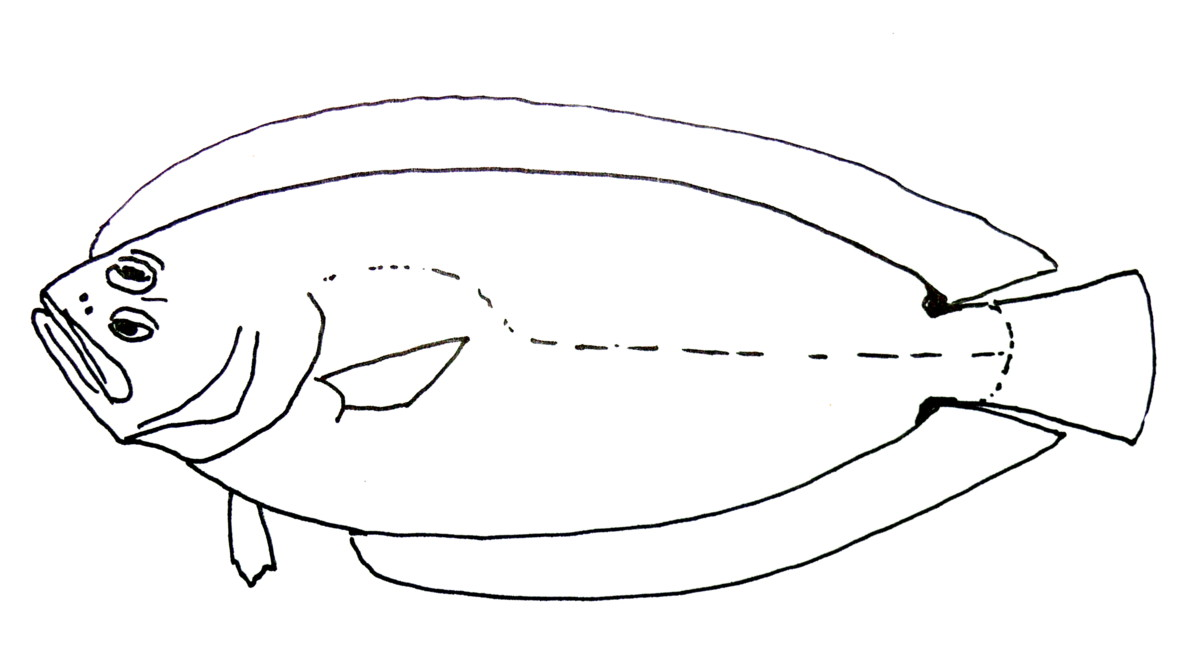
- Twospot largescale flounder (C. macrolepis)

Scientific classification
- Kingdom: Animalia
- Phylum: Chordata
- Class: Actinopterygii
- Order: Carangiformes
- Suborder: Pleuronectoidei
- Family: Citharidae
- Genus: Citharoides; C. L. Hubbs, 1915

Type species
- Citharoides macrolepidotus Hubbs, 1915

Synonyms
- Brachypleurops Fowler, 1934; Paracitharus Regan, 1920

= Citharoides =

Genus of fishes

Citharoides is a genus of citharid flounders native to the Indian and West Pacific Oceans.

== Species ==
The currently recognized species in this genus are:

- Citharoides macrolepidotus C. L. Hubbs, 1915 (branched-ray flounder)
- Citharoides macrolepis (Gilchrist, 1904) (twospot largescale flounder)
- Citharoides orbitalis Hoshino, 2000
