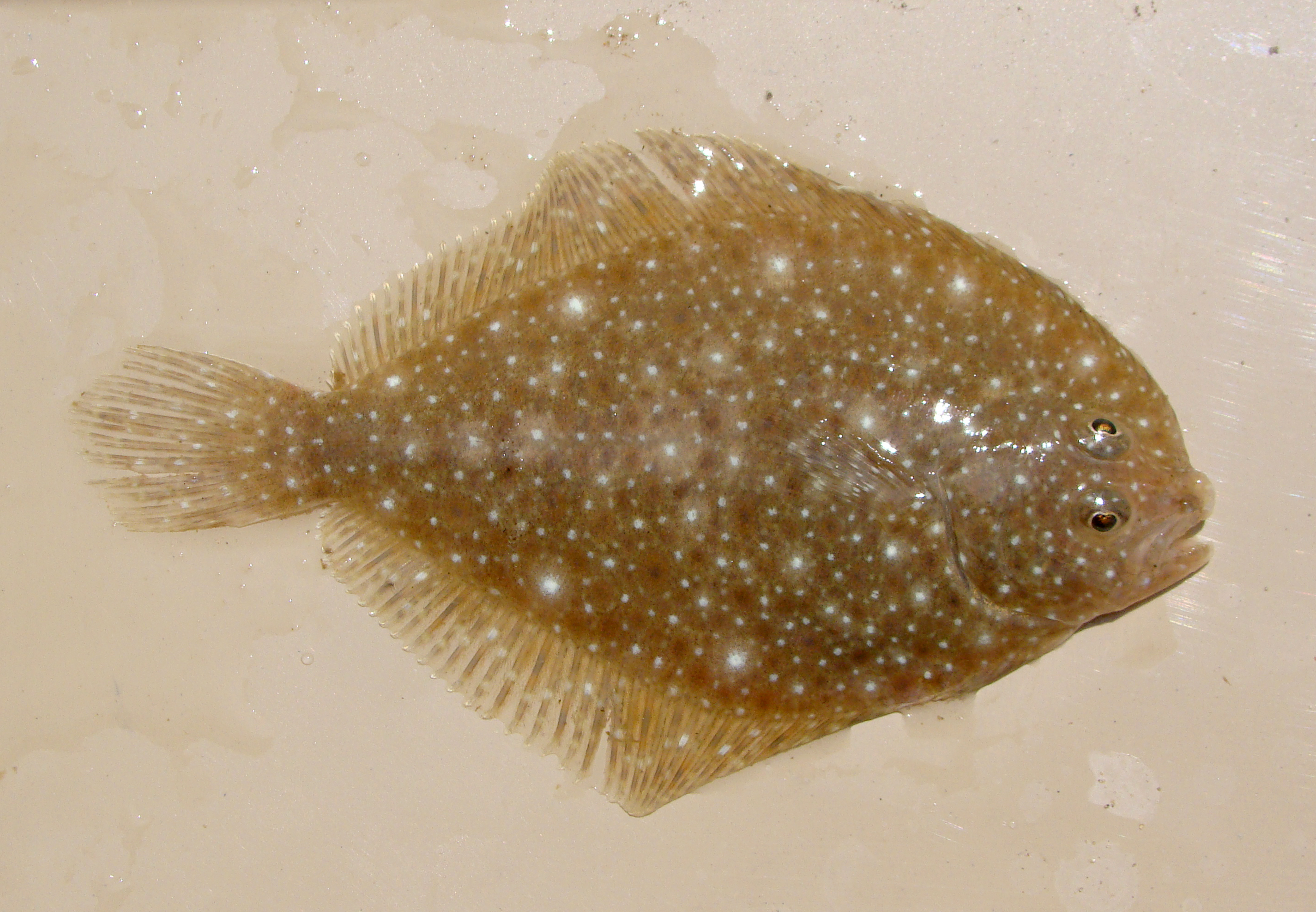

Scientific classification
- Kingdom: Animalia
- Phylum: Chordata
- Class: Actinopterygii
- Order: Carangiformes
- Suborder: Pleuronectoidei
- Family: Oncopteridae; Jordan & Goss, 1889
- Genus: Oncopterus; Steindachner, 1874
- Species: O. darwinii

Binomial name
- Oncopterus darwinii Steindachner, 1874

Synonyms
- Oncopterus darwini (lapsus calami); Curioptera Whitley, 1951

= Remo flounder =

Species of fish

The Remo flounder, Oncopterus darwinii, is an edible flatfish of the monotypic family Oncopteridae. It is a demersal fish that lives on bottoms at depths of between 20 and 80 metres (66 and 262 ft). Its native habitat is the southwestern Atlantic along the southeast coast of South America, from Santa Catarina, Brazil in the north to the San Matías Gulf, Argentina in the south. It can reach 30 centimetres (12 in) in length.

== Identification ==
The Remo flounder is "righteyed", with both its eyes on the right-hand side of its body. Its upper surface is pale brown in colour with small white spots, and large white spots at its edges. The lateral line is marked by a distinctive semi-circular curve above the pectoral fin.
