= Imhoffius =

Imhoffius Temporal range: Middle Eocene

Scientific classification
- Kingdom: Animalia
- Phylum: Chordata
- Class: Actinopterygii
- Order: Carangiformes
- Suborder: Pleuronectoidei
- Genus: †Imhoffius; Chabanaud, 1940
- Species: †I. lutetianus

Binomial name
- †Imhoffius lutetianus Chabanaud, 1940

Extinct genus of fishes

Imhoffius is an extinct genus of prehistoric marine flatfish known from the Eocene of Europe. It contains a single species, I. lutetianus, known from the Middle Eocene (Lutetian)-aged Lutetian limestone of France. About three specimens have been identified.

== See also ==
- Prehistoric fish
- List of prehistoric bony fish
