= Peppered flounder =

Conservation status
- Least Concern (IUCN 3.1)

Scientific classification
- Kingdom: Animalia
- Phylum: Chordata
- Class: Actinopterygii
- Order: Carangiformes
- Suborder: Pleuronectoidei
- Family: Paralichthodidae; Regan, 1920
- Genus: Paralichthodes; Gilchrist, 1902
- Species: P. algoensis

Binomial name
- Paralichthodes algoensis Gilchrist, 1902

Species of fish

The peppered flounder (Paralichthodes algoensis) is a species of flatfish in the monotypic family Paralichthodidae and the only species in the monotypic genus Paralichthodes. It is a demersal fish that lives on sandy and muddy bottoms in subtropical waters, at depths of up to 100 metres (330 ft). Its native habitat is the south-eastern Atlantic and the western Indian Ocean, specifically the African coastline from Mossel Bay, South Africa, to Delagoa Bay, Mozambique. It grows up to 50 centimetres (20 in) in length.

== Description ==
The peppered flounder is a right-eyed flounder with an elongated, oval body. Its upper surface is brownish grey with small dark spots and its underside is white. The lateral line is equally developed on both sides. It has a relatively large, symmetrical mouth.
