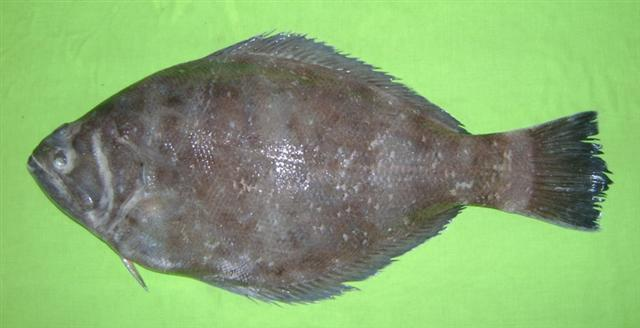

Conservation status
- Data Deficient (IUCN 3.1)

Scientific classification
- Kingdom: Animalia
- Phylum: Chordata
- Class: Actinopterygii
- Order: Carangiformes
- Suborder: Pleuronectoidei
- Family: Psettodidae
- Genus: Psettodes
- Species: P. erumei

Binomial name
- Psettodes erumei (Bloch & Schneider, 1801)

Synonyms
- List of synonyms: Pleuronectes erumei Bloch & Schneider, 1801; Hippoglossus goniographicus Richardson, 1846; Pleuronectes nalaka Cuvier, 1829; Hippoglossus orthorhynchus Richardson, 1846; Hippoglossus quadrifasciatus Bleeker, 1870; Hippoglossus dentex Richardson, 1845

= Psettodes erumei =

Species of fish

Psettodes erumei, commonly known as the Indian halibut or adalah, is a species of flounder found in the Indian and Pacific Oceans, from the Red Sea to northern Australia.

Like other members of its family, it is regarded as one of the most primitive flatfish, having a thicker, less compressed body and a migrated eye that is at the edge of the head rather than fully on top.

The adalah differs from its relatives, such as Psettodes belcheri, by having spiny rays in front of the dorsal fins. It also has multiple stripes along the top of its body, which can range from slightly lighter than its main body colour to a pale white.

This species can reach a maximum length of up to 64 cm (25 in), with a typical size ranging from 18 cm (7 in) to 50 cm (20 in), making it the largest member of its family. The heaviest recorded specimen weighed 9,000 g. It feeds on small fish and aquatic animals found on sandy or muddy bottoms during the night and inhabits depths ranging from 1 m (3 ft) to 100 m (328 ft).

In Thailand, this halibut is considered an important economic species. Traditionally, fishermen would easily catch it by shining storm lanterns onto sandy shores at night to spot the fish buried beneath the sand, which could then be speared with a harpoon. Commonly known in Thailand as pla ta diaw (Thai: ปลาตาเดียว, lit. 'one-eyed fish'), pla chak paan (ปลาจักรผาน), pla bai khanun (ปลาใบขนุน, lit. 'jackfruit leaf fish'), pla na yak (ปลาหน้ายักษ์, lit. 'demon-faced fish'), or pla seek diaw (ปลาซีกเดียว, lit. 'single-sided fish'), named after its distinctive shape, it is enjoyed in various dishes. Popular preparations include deep-frying the fresh fish served with a spicy and sour dipping sauce, or adding dried fish to noodle soups along with pandan leaves to create a sweet and aromatic broth, a traditional recipe from the Teochew Chinese community.
