= Brachypleura =

Conservation status
- Least Concern (IUCN 3.1)

Scientific classification
- Kingdom: Animalia
- Phylum: Chordata
- Class: Actinopterygii
- Division: Teleostei
- Order: Carangiformes
- Suborder: Pleuronectoidei
- Family: Citharidae
- Genus: Brachypleura; Günther, 1862
- Species: B. novaezeelandiae

Binomial name
- Brachypleura novaezeelandiae Günther, 1862

Species of fish

Brachypleura novaezeelandiae, the yellow-dabbled flounder or yellow citharid, is a species of citharid flounder native to the western and central Indo-Pacific. It occurs at depths from 18 to 92 m (59 to 302 ft) and is of minor importance to commercial fisheries. This species grows to a length of 14 cm (5.5 in). This species is the only known member of the genus Brachypleura.
