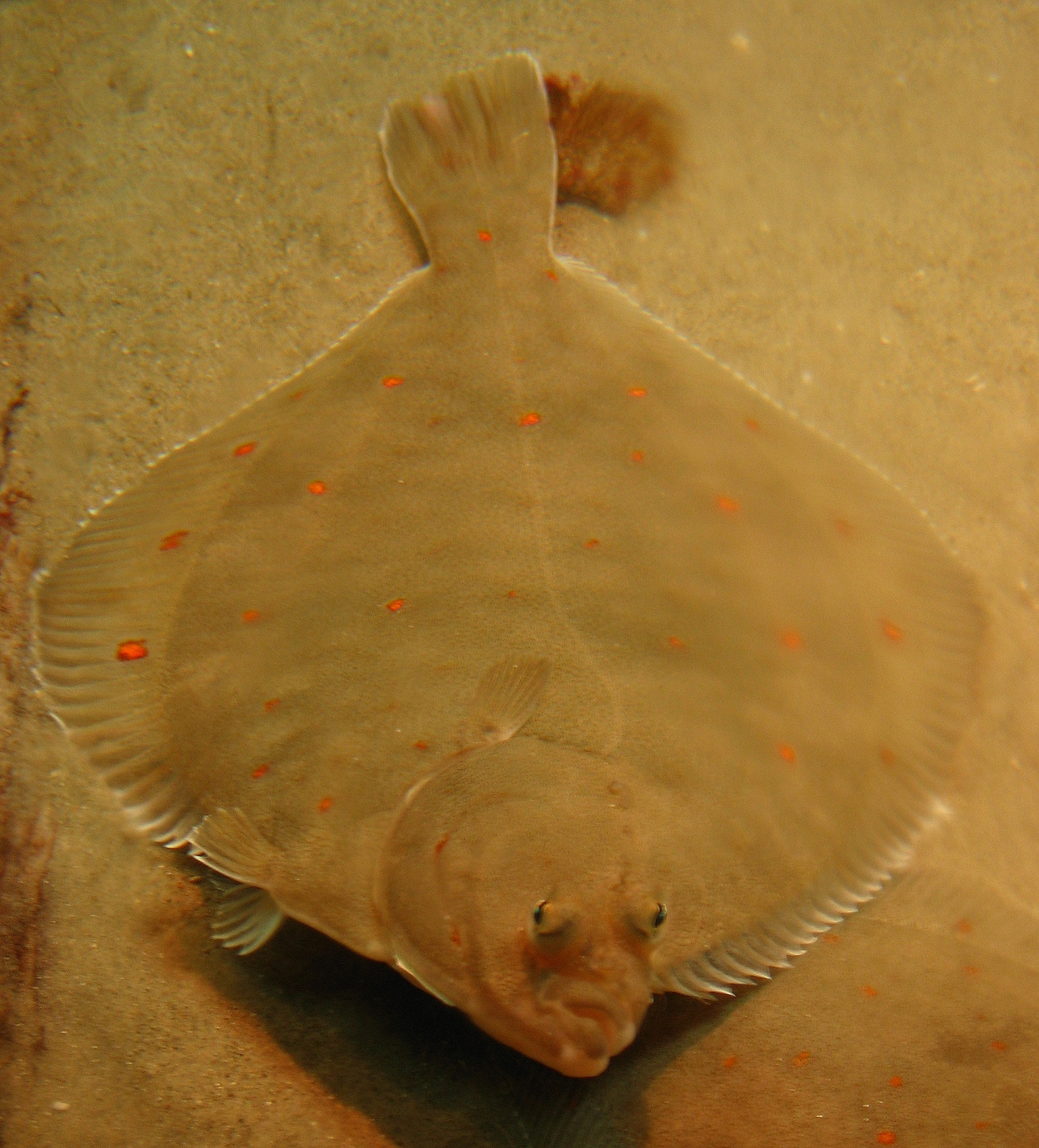
- European plaice (Pleuronectes platessa)

Scientific classification
- Kingdom: Animalia
- Phylum: Chordata
- Class: Actinopterygii
- Division: Teleostei
- Order: Carangiformes
- Suborder: Pleuronectoidei; Cuvier, 1817

Type species
- Pleuronectes platessa Linnaeus, 1758

Families
- See text

Synonyms
- Heterosamata Jordan & Evermann, 1896; Pleuronectiformes Regan, 1910; Soleiformes Regan, 1910; Polynemoidei Regan, 1909; Pleuronectoideo Girard et al, 2020

= Flatfish =

Flatfish Temporal range: Late Paleocene–Recent

Suborder of fishes

Flatfish are a group of ray-finned fish belonging to the suborder Pleuronectoidei of the order Carangiformes. Their collective common name is due to their habit of lying on one side of their laterally-compressed body (flattened side-to-side) upon the seafloor; in this position, both eyes lie on the side of the head facing upwards, while the other side of the head and body (the "blind side") lies on the substrate. This loss of symmetry, a unique adaptation in vertebrates, stems from one eye "migrating" towards the other during the juvenile's metamorphosis. Due to interspecific variation, some species tend to face their left side upward, some their right side, and others face either side upward; members of Pleuronectidae lie on their left side, with eyes on the right, Paralichthyidae lie on their right side, with eyes on the left, while the "primitive" genus Psettodes may develop into "right-facing" or "left-facing" individuals.

They are one of the most diverse groups of demersal fish. Their cryptic coloration and habits, a form of camouflage, conceals them from potential predators. Many species are of interest for fisheries.

== Common names ==
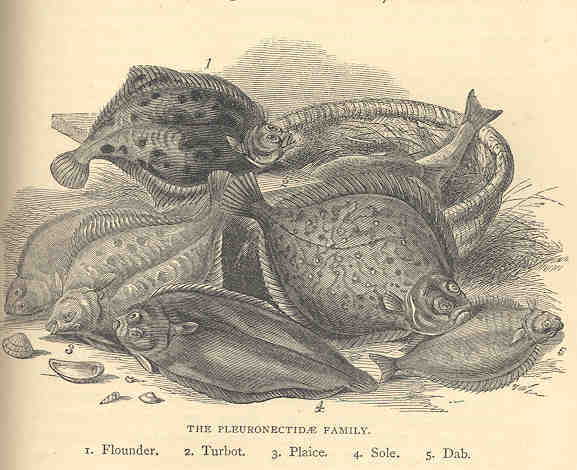
Illustration of several common European flatfish species

There are a multitude of common names for flatfish, as they are a widespread group of fish and important food fish across the world. The following are common flatfish names in English:

- Brill
- Dab
- Flounder
- Halibut
- Megrim
- Plaice
- Sanddab
- Sole
- Tonguefish
- Turbot

As these are merely common names, they do not conform with the "natural" relationships that are recovered through scientific studies of morphology or genetics. As examples, the three species consistently called "halibut" are themselves part of the right-eye flounder family, while the spiny turbots are not at all closely related to "true" turbot, but are consistently recovered in a "primitive" or basal position at the base of flatfish phylogenetic trees.

== Distribution ==
Flatfishes are found in oceans worldwide, ranging from the Arctic, through the tropics, to Antarctica. Species diversity is centered in the Indo-West Pacific and declines following both latitudinal and longitudinal gradients away from this centre of diversity. Most species are found in depths between 0 and 500 m (1,600 ft), but a few have been recorded from depths in excess of 1,500 m (4,900 ft). None have been confirmed from the abyssal or hadal zones of the deep sea; a reported observation of a flatfish from the Bathyscaphe Trieste's dive into the Mariana Trench (at a depth of almost 11 km (36,000 ft)) has been questioned by ichthyologists, and recent authorities do not recognize it as valid. Among the deepwater species is Symphurus thermophilus, a tonguefish which congregates around "ponds" of sulphur at hydrothermal vents on the seafloor; no other flatfish is known from hydrothermal vent ecosystems.

Conversely, many species will enter brackish or fresh water, and the families Achiridae, Soleidae, and Cynoglossidae include species that are entirely restricted to freshwater.

== Description ==
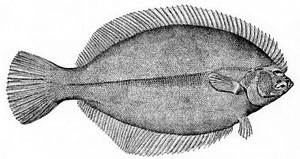
Winter flounder; Pleuronectidae

The most obvious characteristic of the flatfish is their asymmetry, with both eyes lying on the same side of the head in the adult fish. In some families, the eyes are usually on the right side of the body (dextral or right-eyed flatfish), and in others, they are usually on the left (sinistral or left-eyed flatfish). The primitive spiny turbots include equal numbers of right- and left-sided individuals, and are generally less asymmetrical than the other families. Other distinguishing features of the order are the presence of protrusible eyes, another adaptation to living on the seabed (benthos), and the extension of the dorsal fin onto the head.

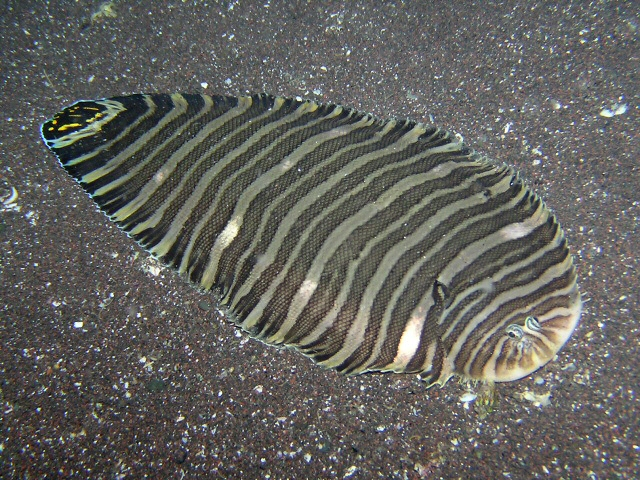
Zebrias zebra; Soleidae

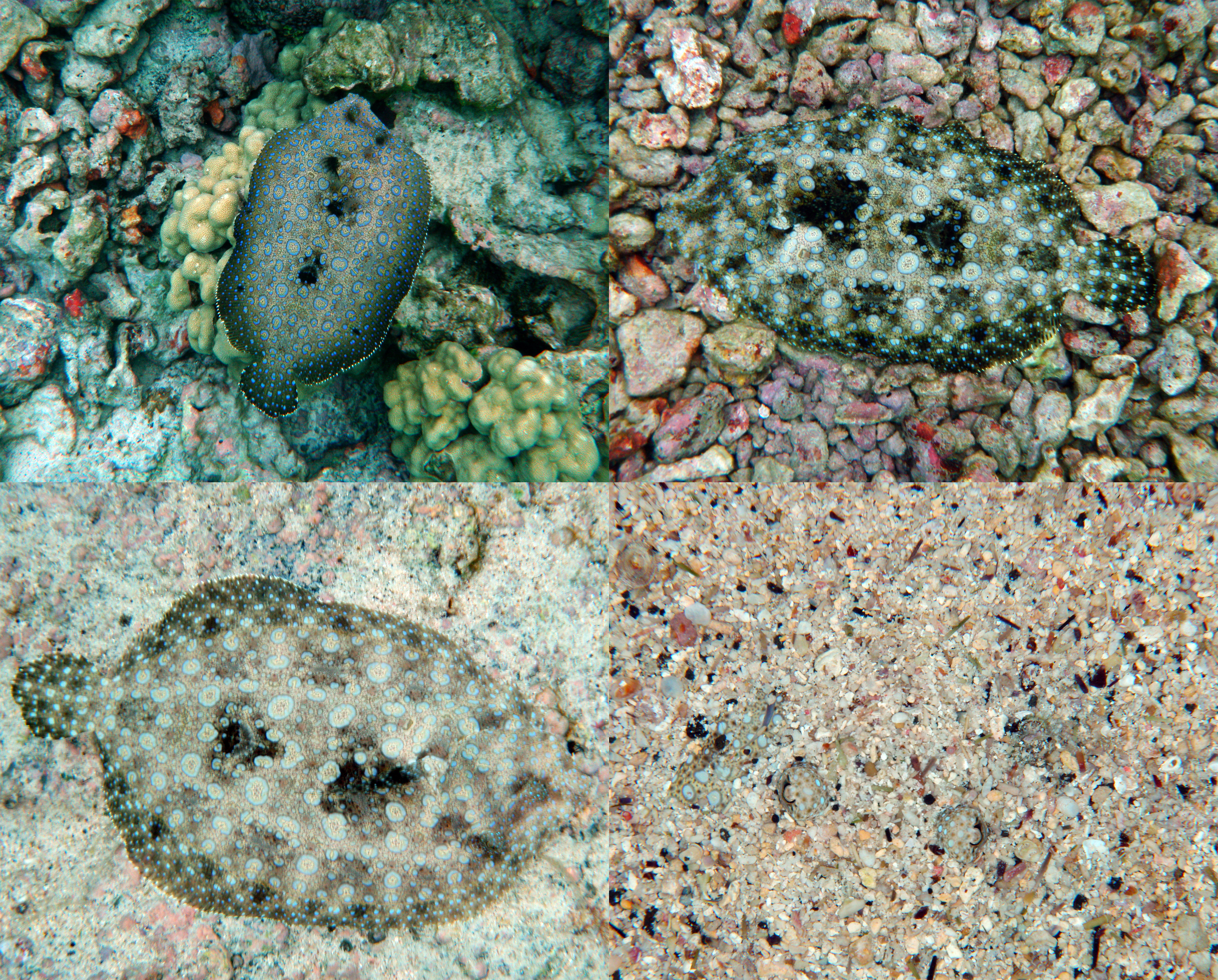
This sequence of photos shows an individual peacock flounder (Bothidae) changing its coloration over different substrates.

The surface of the fish facing away from the sea floor is pigmented, often serving to camouflage the fish, but at times displaying striking patterns. Some flatfishes are also able to change their pigmentation to match the background using their chromatophores, in a manner similar to some cephalopods. The side of the body without the eyes, facing the seabed, is usually colourless or very pale.

In general, flatfishes rely on their camouflage for avoiding predators, but some have aposematic traits such as conspicuous eyespots (e.g., Microchirus ocellatus) and several small tropical species (at least Aseraggodes, Pardachirus and Zebrias) are poisonous. Juveniles of Soleichthys maculosus mimic toxic flatworms of the genus Pseudobiceros in both colours and swimming pattern. Conversely, a few octopus species have been reported to mimic flatfishes in colours, shape and swimming mode.

Flatfishes range in size from the sand flounder Tarphops oligolepis, measuring about 6.5 cm (2.6 in) in length, and weighing 2 g (0.071 oz), to the Hippoglossus halibuts, with the Atlantic halibut measuring up to 4.7 m (15 ft) long, and the Pacific halibut weighing up to 363 kg (800 lb).

Many species such as flounders and spiny turbots eat smaller fish, and have well-developed teeth. These species sometimes hunt in the midwater, away from the bottom, and show fewer "extreme" adaptations than other families. The soles, by contrast, are almost exclusively bottom-dwellers (more strictly demersal), and feed on benthic invertebrates. They show a more extreme asymmetry, and may lack teeth on one side of the jaw.

=== Development ===
European flounder, like other flatfish, experience an eye migration during their lifetime.

Flatfishes lay eggs that hatch into larvae resembling typical, symmetrical, fish. These are initially elongated, but quickly develop into a more rounded form. The larvae typically have protective spines on the head, over the gills, and in the pelvic and pectoral fins. They also possess a swim bladder, and do not dwell on the bottom, instead dispersing from their hatching grounds as ichthyoplankton. Bilaterally symmetric fish such as goldfish maintain balance using a system within their inner ears which involves the otolith, but larval and metamorphizing flatfish require visible light (such as sunlight) to properly orient themselves.

The length of the planktonic stage varies between different types of flatfishes, but through the influence of thyroid hormones, they eventually begin to metamorphose into the adult form. One of the eyes migrates across the top of the head and onto the other side of the body, leaving the fish blind on one side. The larva also loses its swim bladder and spines, and sinks to the bottom, laying its blind side on the underlying surface.

=== Hybrids ===
Hybrids are well known in flatfishes. The Pleuronectidae have the largest number of reported hybrids of marine fishes. Two of the most famous intergeneric hybrids are between the European plaice (Pleuronectes platessa) and European flounder (Platichthys flesus) in the Baltic Sea, and between the English sole (Parophrys vetulus) and starry flounder (Platichthys stellatus) in Puget Sound. The offspring of the latter species pair is popularly known as the hybrid sole and was initially believed to be a valid species in its own right.

== Evolution ==
Flatfishes have been cited as dramatic examples of evolutionary adaptation. In The Blind Watchmaker, Richard Dawkins explains the flatfishes' evolutionary history as such:

...bony fish as a rule have a marked tendency to be flattened in a vertical direction.... It was natural, therefore, that when the ancestors of [flatfish] took to the sea bottom, they should have lain on one side.... But this raised the problem that one eye was always looking down into the sand and was effectively useless. In evolution this problem was solved by the lower eye 'moving' round to the upper side.

Scientists have been proposing since the 1910s that flatfishes evolved from more "typical" percoid ancestors. The fossil record indicated that flatfishes might have been present before the Eocene, based on fossil otoliths resembling those of modern pleuronectiforms dating back to the Thanetian and Ypresian stages (57-53 million years ago). Despite this, the origin of the unusual morphology of flatfishes was enigmatic up to the 2000s, with earlier researchers having suggested that it came about as a result of saltation rather than gradual evolution through natural selection, because a partially migrated eye was considered to have been maladaptive.

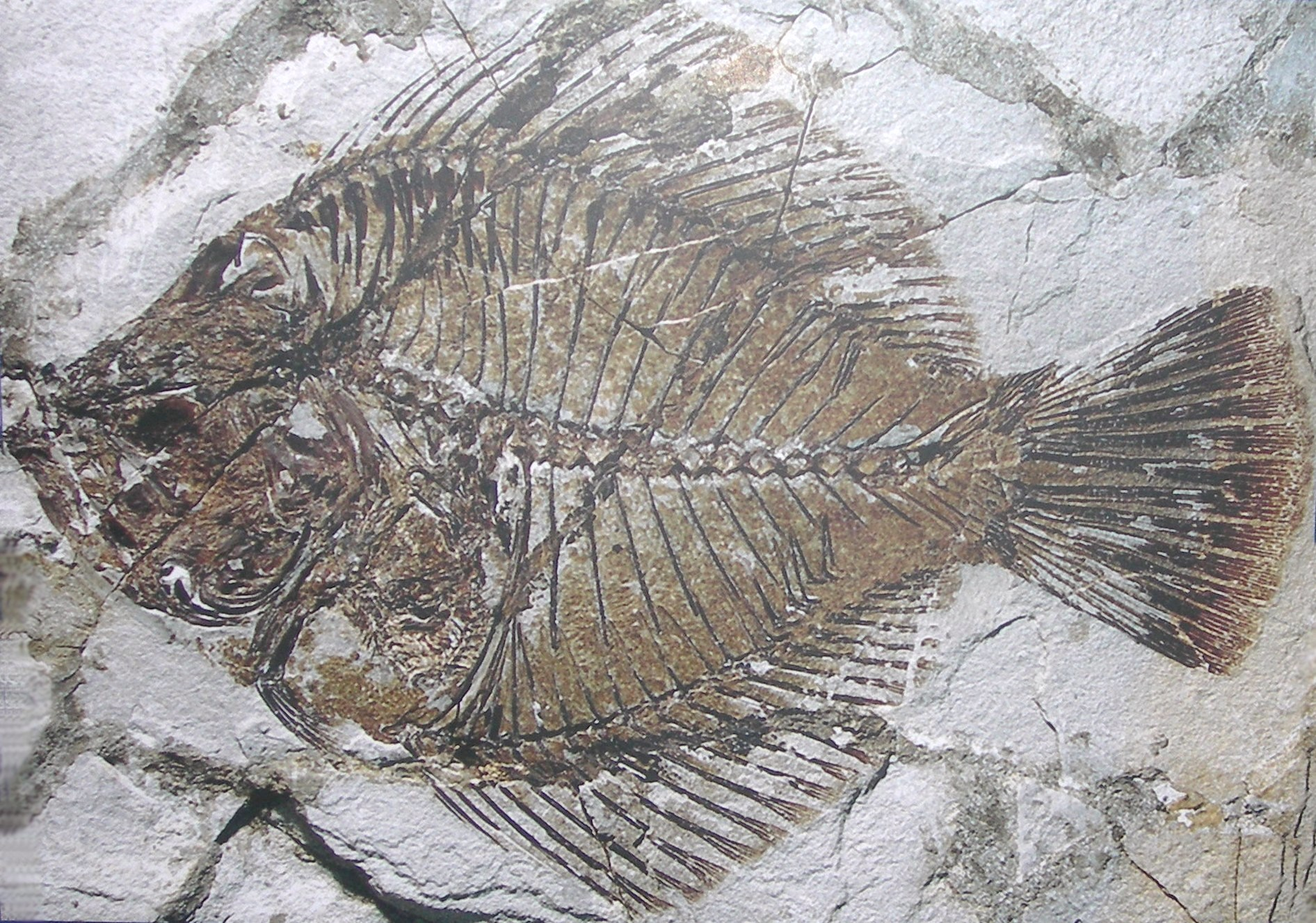
Specimen of Amphistium.

This started to change in 2008 with a study on the two fossil fish genera; Amphistium and Heteronectes, which dated to about 50 million years ago. These genera retain primitive features not seen in modern types of flatfishes, such as their heads being less asymmetric than modern flatfishes, retaining one eye on each side of their heads, although the eye on one side is closer to the top of the head than on the other. The more recently described fossil genera Quasinectes and Anorevus have been proposed to show similar morphologies and have also been classified as "stem-pleuronectiforms". Such findings lead palaeontologist Matt Friedman to conclude that the evolution of flatfish morphology "happened gradually, in a way consistent with evolution via natural selection—not suddenly [saltationally] as researchers once had little choice but to believe."

To explain the survival advantage of a partially migrated eye, it has been proposed that primitive flatfishes like Amphistium rested with the head propped up above the seafloor (a behaviour sometimes observed in modern flatfishes), enabling them to use their partially migrated eye to see things closer to the seafloor. While known basal genera like Amphistium and Heteronectes support a gradual acquisition of the flatfish morphology, they were probably not direct ancestors to living pleuronectiforms, as fossil evidence (for example Eobothus) indicate that most flatfish lineages living today were present in the Eocene and contemporaneous with them. It has been suggested that the more primitive forms were eventually outcompeted.

Also known from the Bolca deposits are two more intermediate early flatfish relatives, Anorevus and Quasinectes, both of which also show the beginnings of an asymmetrical, flattened body, but still have one eye on either side of the head.

== Taxonomy ==
Due to their highly distinctive morphology, flatfishes were previously treated as belonging to their own order, Pleuronectiformes. However, more recent taxonomic studies have found them to group within a diverse group of nektonic marine fishes known as the Carangiformes, which also includes jacks and billfish. Specifically, flatfish have been recovered to be closely related to various groups, such as the threadfins (often recovered as a sister group to flatfish), archerfish, and beachsalmons. Due to this, they are now treated as a suborder of the Carangiformes, as represented in Eschmeyer's Catalog of Fishes.

=== Classification ===
The following classification is based on Eschmeyer's Catalog of Fishes (2025):

- Suborder Pleuronectoidei
  - Family Polynemidae Rafinesque, 1815 (threadfins or tassel-fishes)
  - Family Psettodidae Regan, 1910 (spiny turbots)
  - Family Citharidae de Buen, 1935 (largescale flounders)
  - Family Scophthalmidae Chabanaud, 1933 (turbots)
  - Family Cyclopsettidae Campbell, Chanet, Chen, Lee & Chen, 2019 (sand whiffs or large-tooth flounders)
  - Family Grammatobothidae Tongboonkua, Chanet & Chen, 2025 (small lefteye flounders)
  - Family Monolenidae Tongboonkua, Chanet & Chen, 2025 (deepwater lefteye flounders)
  - Family Taeniopsettidae Amaoka, 1969
  - Family Bothidae Smitt, 1892 (lefteye flounders)
  - Family Paralichthyidae Regan, 1910 (sand flounders)
  - Family Pleuronectidae Rafinesque, 1815 (righteye flounders)
  - Family Paralichthodidae Regan, 1920 (peppered flounders)
  - Family Oncopteridae Jordan & Goss, 1889 (remo flounders)
  - Family Rhombosoleidae Regan, 1910 (South Pacific flounders)
  - Family Achiropsettidae Heemstra, 1990 (southern flounders or armless flounders)
  - Family Achiridae Rafinesque, 1815 (American soles)
  - Family Samaridae Jordan & Goss, 1889 (crested flounders)
  - Family Poecilopsettidae Norman, 1934 (bigeye flounders)
  - Family Soleidae Bonaparte, 1833 (soles)
  - Family Cynoglossidae Jordan, 1888 (tonguefishes)

==== Fossil taxa ====
The following basal fossil flatfish from the Paleogene are also known:

- Genus †Amphistium Agassiz, 1844 (Early to Middle Eocene of Italy & France)
- Genus †Anorevus Bannikov & Zorzin, 2020 (Early Eocene of Italy)
- Genus †Eobothus Eastman, 1914 (Early Eocene of Italy)
- Genus †Heteronectes Friedman, 2008 (Early Eocene of Italy)
- Genus †Imhoffius Chabanaud, 1940 (Middle Eocene of France)
- Genus †Joleaudichthys Chabanaud, 1937 (Middle Eocene of Egypt)
- Genus †Keasichthys Murray & Champagne, 2025 (Early Oligocene of Oregon, US)
- Genus †Numidiopleura Gaudant & Gaudant, 1969 (Eocene of Tunisia)
- Genus †Quasinectes Bannikov & Zorzin, 2019 (Early Eocene of Italy)

=== Phylogeny ===
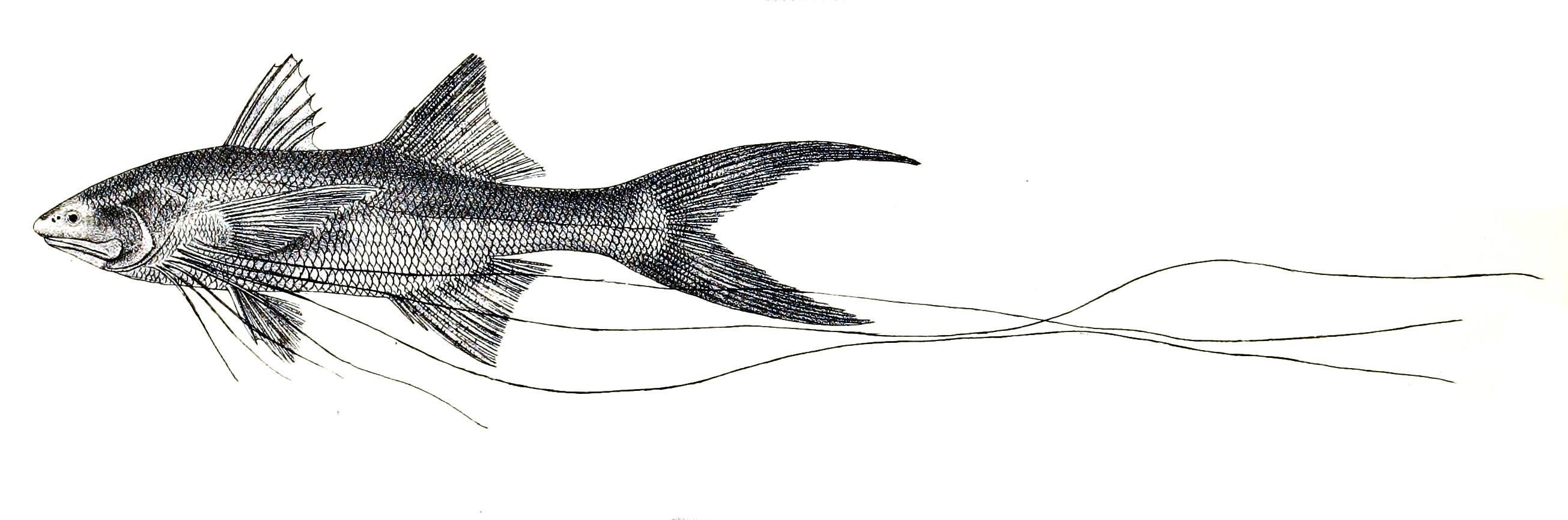
Threadfins such as Polynemus have been recovered closer to the primitive spiny turbots than those are to other flatfish, or as a sister group to a monophyletic flatfish group

There has been some disagreement whether flatfish as a whole are a monophyletic group. Some palaeontologists think that some percomorph groups unrelated to flatfishes were also "experimenting" with head asymmetry during the Eocene, and certain molecular studies conclude that the primitive family of Psettodidae evolved their flat bodies and asymmetrical head independently of other flatfish groups. The following phylogeny is from Lü et al. 2021; a whole-genome analysis using concatenated sequences of coding sequence (CDS) (codon1 + 2 + 3, GTRGAMMA model; codon1 + 2, GTRGAMMA model) and 4dTV (fourfold degenerate synonymous site, GTRGAMMA model) derived from 1,693 single-copy genes. Notably, Pleuronectiformes is found to be polyphyletic as seen here:

- - Polynemidae
    Polydactylus sextarius
  - - Toxotidae
      Toxotes chatareus
    - Psettodoidei Psettodidae
      Psettodes erumei
- Pleuronectoidei
  - ⊞Achiridae, Cynoglossidae, Rhombosoleidae, Soleidae
    ⊟
    - - Achiridae
        Trinectes maculatus
      - Rhombosoleidae
        Colistium nudipinnis
    - - Soleidae
        Brachirus orientalis
      - Cynoglossidae
        - Cynoglossus semilaevis
        - Paraplagusia blochii
  - ⊞Bothidae, Paralichthyidae, Pleuronectidae, Scophthalmidae
    ⊟
    - Scophthalmidae
      Scophthalmus maximus
    - - Bothidae
        Chascanopsetta lugubris
      - - Pleuronectidae
          Platichthys stellatus
        - Paralichthyidae
          - Paralichthys olivaceus
          - Pseudorhombus dupliocellatus

However, threadfins (Polynemidae) aren't universally found to be nested within the group of flatfish, as recovered by a study of ultraconserved elements from the threadfin family in Girard et al. 2022, or as represented in the World Register of Marine Species, where Pleuronectiformes is retained as a name for the flatfish group. Numerous scientists continue to argue for a monophyletic group of all flatfish, though the debate continues.

Over 800 described species are placed into 16 families. When they were treated as an order, the flatfishes are divided into two suborders, Psettodoidei and Pleuronectoidei, with > 99% of the species diversity found within the Pleuronectoidei. The largest families are Soleidae, Bothidae and Cynoglossidae with more than 150 species each. There also exist two monotypic families (Paralichthodidae and Oncopteridae). Some families are the results of relatively recent splits. For example, the Achiridae were classified as a subfamily of Soleidae in the past, and the Samaridae were considered a subfamily of the Pleuronectidae. The families Paralichthodidae, Poecilopsettidae, and Rhombosoleidae were also traditionally treated as subfamilies of Pleuronectidae, but are now recognised as families in their own right. The Paralichthyidae has long been indicated to be paraphyletic, with the formal description of Cyclopsettidae in 2019 resulting in the split of this family as well. The following is the maximum likelihood phylogenetic tree from Campbell et al. 2019, which was obtained by analyzing seven protein-coding genes. This study erected two new families to resolve the previously non-monophyletic status of Paralichthyidae and the Rhombosoleidae:

- Centropomus
- - Lates
  - - Psettodes
    - Pleuronectoidei
      - Citharoidea Citharidae
        ⊞
        ⊟
        - Brachypleura
        - - Lepidoblepharon
          - - Citharoides
            - Citharus
      - - Soleoidea
          ⊞Achiridae, Achiropsettidae, Cynoglossidae, Poecilopsettidae, Rhombosoleidae, Samaridae, Soleidae, a few monotypic families
          ⊟
          - - Achiridae
              - Gymnachirus
              - Trinectes
            - - Paralichthodidae
                Paralichthodes
              - - Oncopteridae
                  Oncopterus
                - - Achiropsettidae
                    Mancopsetta
                  - Rhombosoleidae
                    Rhombosolea
          - - Samaridae
              - Samariscus
              - - Plagiopsetta
                - Samaris
            - - Poecilopsettidae
                - Nematops
                - Poecilopsetta
              - - Cynoglossidae
                  - Symphurus
                  - - Cynoglossus
                    - Paraplagusia
                - Soleidae
                  - - Aseraggodes
                    - Pardachirus
                  - - - Brachirus
                      - Zebrias
                    - - Pegusa
                      - Solea
        - Pleuronectoidea
          ⊞Bothidae, Cyclopsettidae, Scophthalmidae, Paralichthyidae, Pleuronectidae
          ⊟
          - - Scophthalmidae
              - Lepidorhombus
              - Scophthalmus
            - - Paralichthyidae
                - Xystreurys
                - - Paralichthys
                  - Pseudorhombus
              - Pleuronectidae
                - - Hypsopsetta
                  - Pleuronichthys
                - - Limanda
                  - - Eopsetta
                    - Hippoglossus
          - - Cyclopsettidae
              - Cyclopsetta
              - - Citharichthys
                - Etropus
            - Bothidae
              - Chascanopsetta
              - - Taeniopsetta
                - - - Engyprosopon
                    - - Arnoglossus
                      - Parabothus
                  - - Bothus
                    - - Laeops
                      - - Kamoharaia
                        - - Japonolaeops
                          - Neolaeops

The taxonomy of some groups is in need of a review. The last monograph covering the entire order was John Roxborough Norman's Monograph of the Flatfishes published in 1934. In particular, Tephrinectes sinensis may represent a family-level lineage and requires further evaluation e.g. New species are described with some regularity and undescribed species likely remain.

== Relation to humans ==
=== Fishing and aquaculture ===
Flatfish are commonly fished using bottom trawls. Large species such as the halibuts are specifically targeted by fisheries, resulting in heavy fishing pressures and bycatch. Some species are aquacultured, such as the tonguefish Cynoglossus semilaevis.

=== As food ===
Flatfish is considered a whitefish because of the high concentration of oils within its liver. Its lean flesh makes for a unique flavor that differs from species to species. Methods of cooking include grilling, pan-frying, baking and deep-frying.

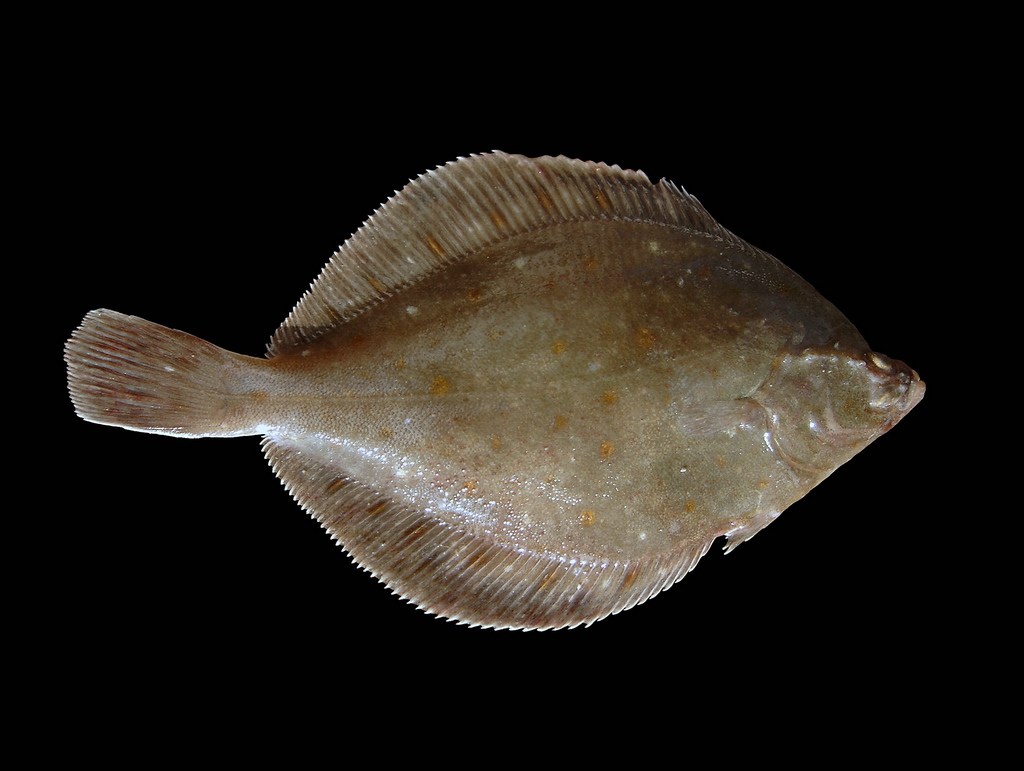
The European plaice is the principal commercial flatfish in Europe.

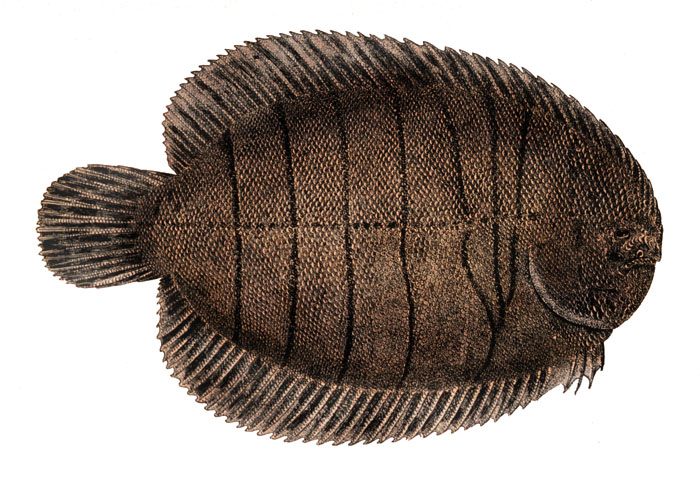
American soles are found in both freshwater and marine environments of the Americas.

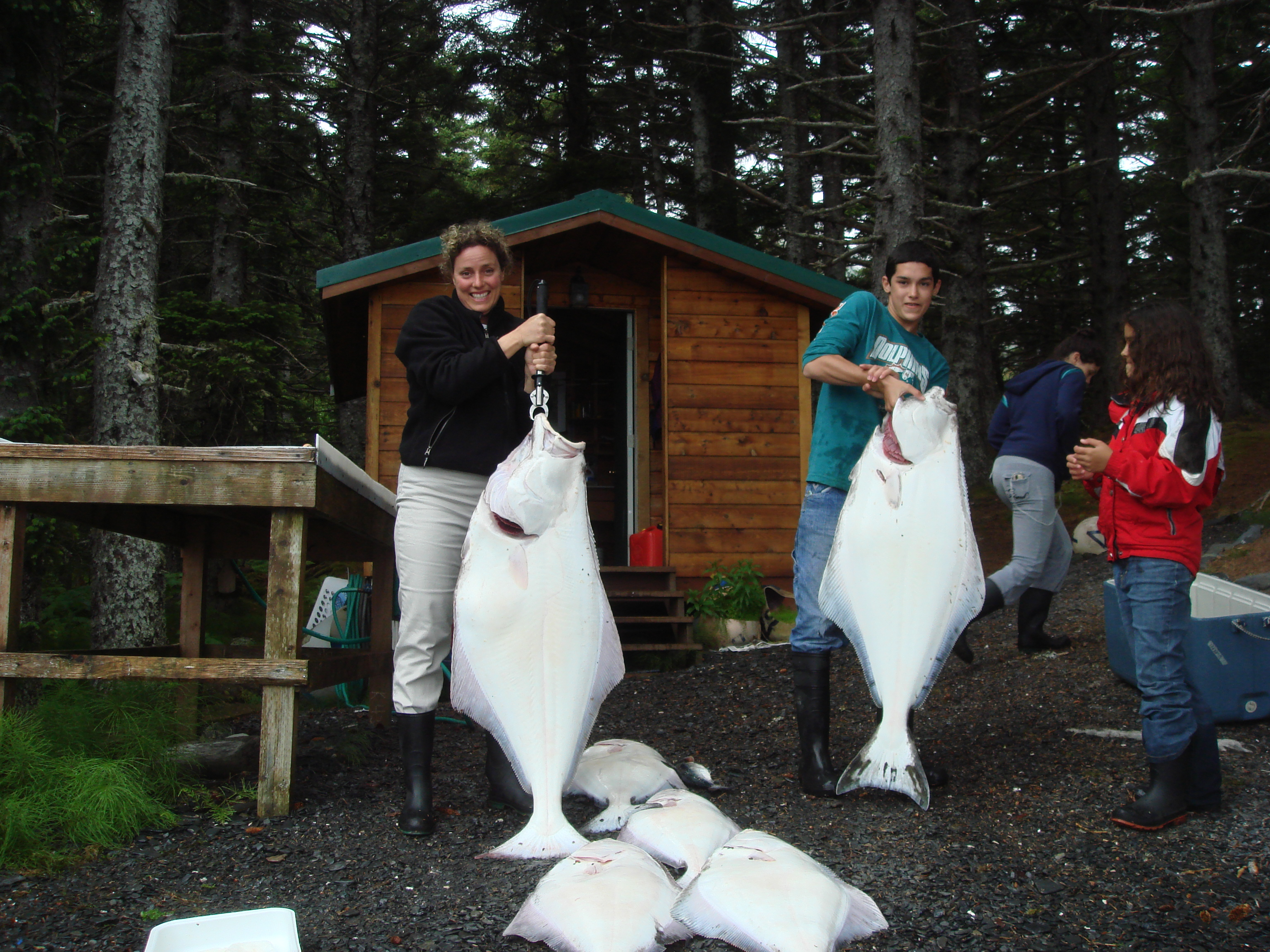
Halibut are the largest of the flatfishes, and provide lucrative fisheries.

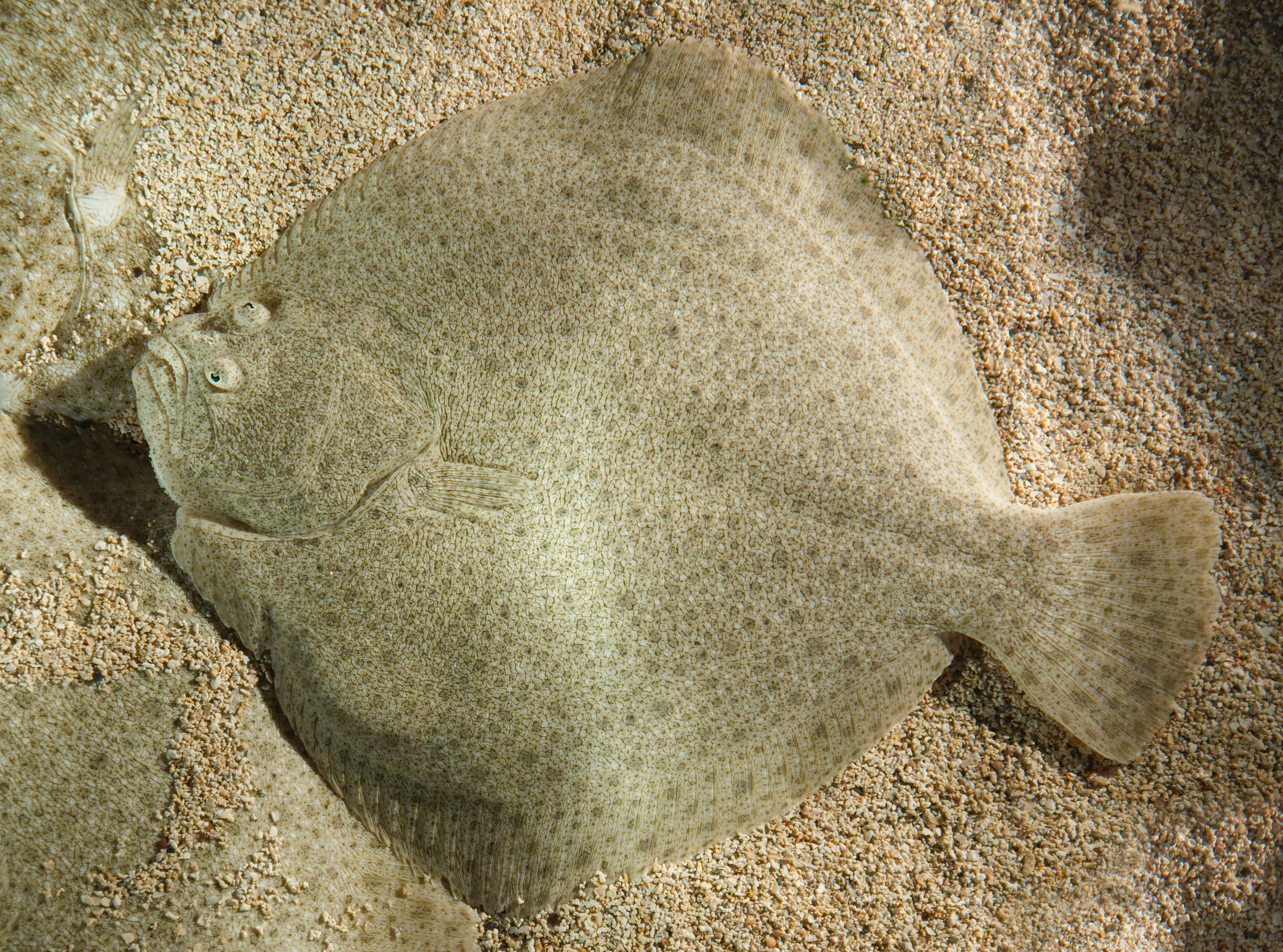
The turbot is a large, left-eyed flatfish found in sandy shallow coastal waters around Europe.

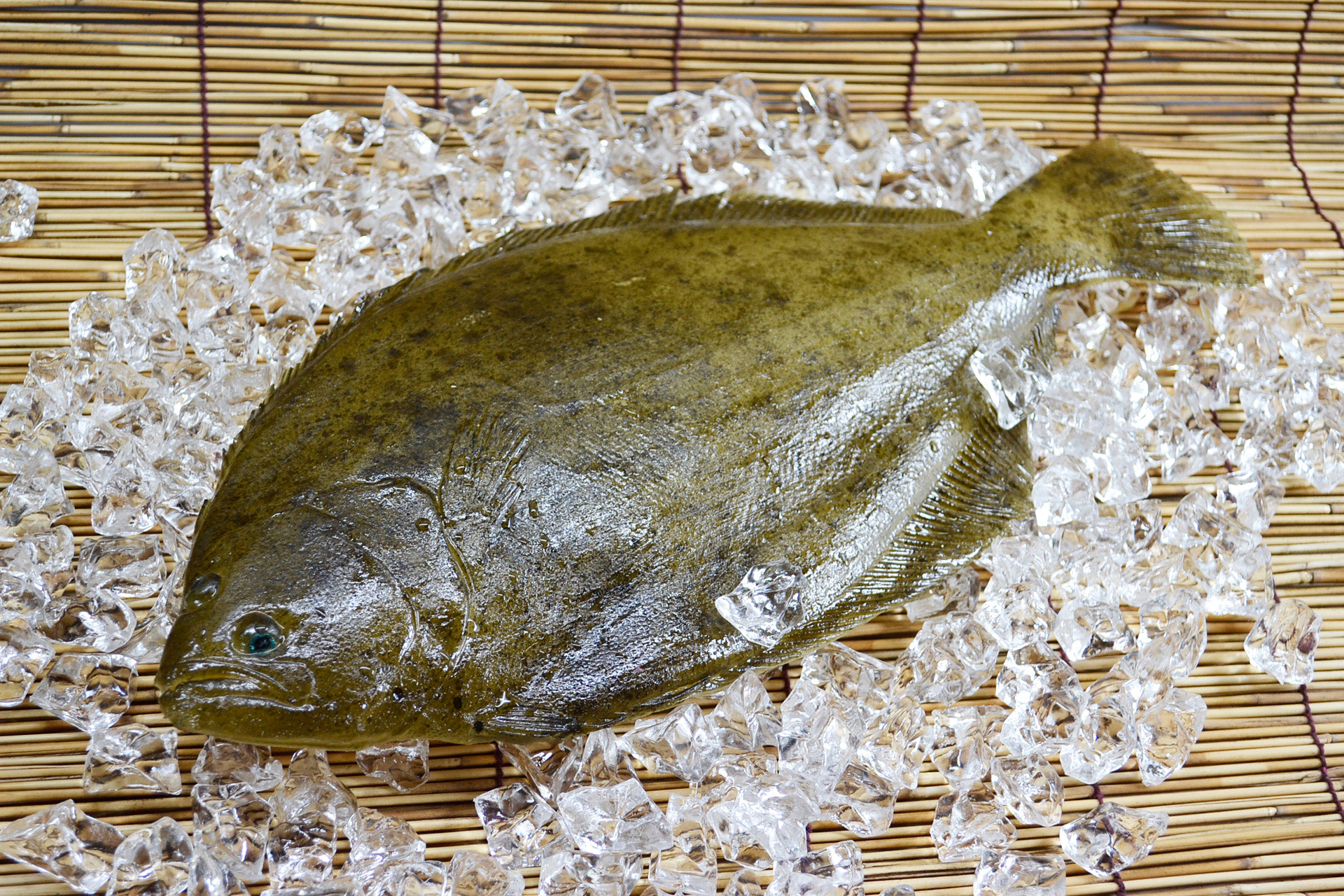
Flatfish (left‐eyed flounder)
