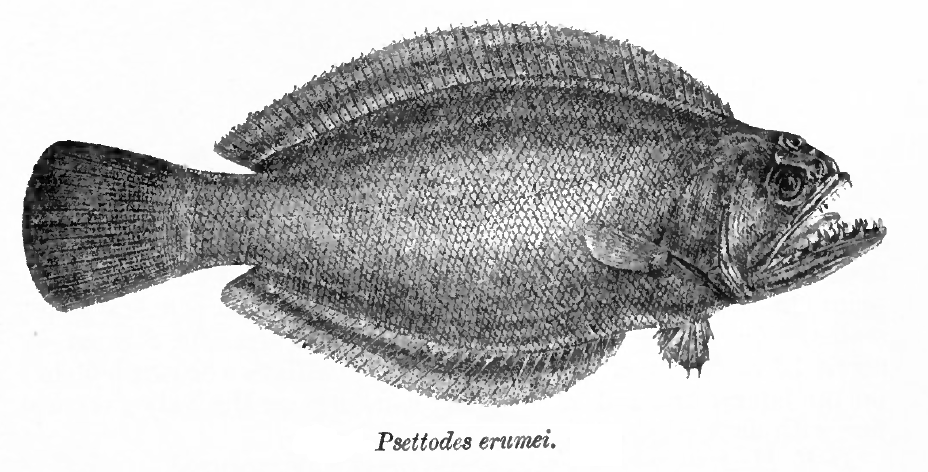
- Indian halibut (P. erumei)

Scientific classification
- Kingdom: Animalia
- Phylum: Chordata
- Class: Actinopterygii
- Order: Carangiformes
- Suborder: Pleuronectoidei
- Family: Psettodidae; Regan, 1910
- Genus: Psettodes; E. T. Bennett, 1831

Type species
- Psettodes belcheri Bennett, 1831

= Spiny turbot =

Spiny turbots

Family of fishes

The spiny turbots are a family, Psettodidae, of relatively large, primitive flatfish found in the tropical waters of the east Atlantic and Indo-Pacific. The family contains three species, all in the same genus, Psettodes. The common name comes from the presence of spines in the dorsal and anal fins, which may indicate an evolutionary relationship with the Perciformes. Spiny turbots are less asymmetrical than other flatfish, although the region around the eyes is twisted. They reach lengths of 55–80 cm (22–31 in).

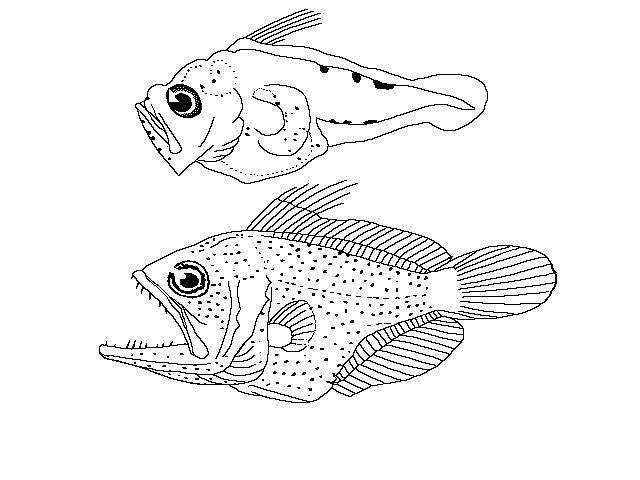
Late stage larvae of P. erumei

== Species ==
The currently recognized species in this genus are:

- Psettodes belcheri E. T. Bennett, 1831 (spottail spiny turbot)
- Psettodes bennetti Steindachner, 1870 (spiny turbot)
- Psettodes erumei (Bloch & J. G. Schneider, 1801) (Indian halibut)
