= Heteronectes =

Heteronectes Temporal range: Early Eocene

Scientific classification
- Kingdom: Animalia
- Phylum: Chordata
- Class: Actinopterygii
- Division: Teleostei
- Order: Carangiformes
- Suborder: Pleuronectoidei
- Genus: †Heteronectes; Friedman, 2008
- Species: †H. chaneti

Binomial name
- †Heteronectes chaneti Friedman, 2008

Extinct genus of fishes

Heteronectes is an extinct genus of early flatfish from the Eocene of Europe. It contains a single species, H. chaneti from the early Eocene-aged Monte Bolca site of Italy.

Heteronectes is reported to be a transitional fossil. In a typical modern flatfish, the head is asymmetric with both eyes on one side of the head. In Heteronectes, the transition from the typical symmetric head of a vertebrate is incomplete, with one eye positioned near the top of the head, very similar (but less so) to its Italian relative Amphistium. The rest of the skeleton also has some primitive features in common with other percomorph groups, but absent in living flatfishes.

The condition in modern, bottom-dwelling flatfish with both eyes on the same side of the head was cited by St. George Jackson Mivart as difficult to imagine how it could have evolved in a gradual fashion by natural selection, as proposed by Charles Darwin. Many evolutionary biologists agreed, and suggested that modern flatfish anatomy arose as a result of saltation. The 2008 discovery of Heteronectes and Amphistium was considered a vindication of the viability of a gradual transition.

Friedman suggested that Heteronectes and Amphistium did not rest completely on the sea floor like modern flatfishes. Instead, they might have only held their tail to the sea floor and kept their head lifted into the water above, using one eye to watch for predators, while the other was used to look for prey in the mud below. From previous fossil findings, Friedman also notes that several modern families of flatfish seems to have coexisted with Heteronectes and Amphistium, and speculated that the modern ones eventually outcompeted their primitive relatives.
