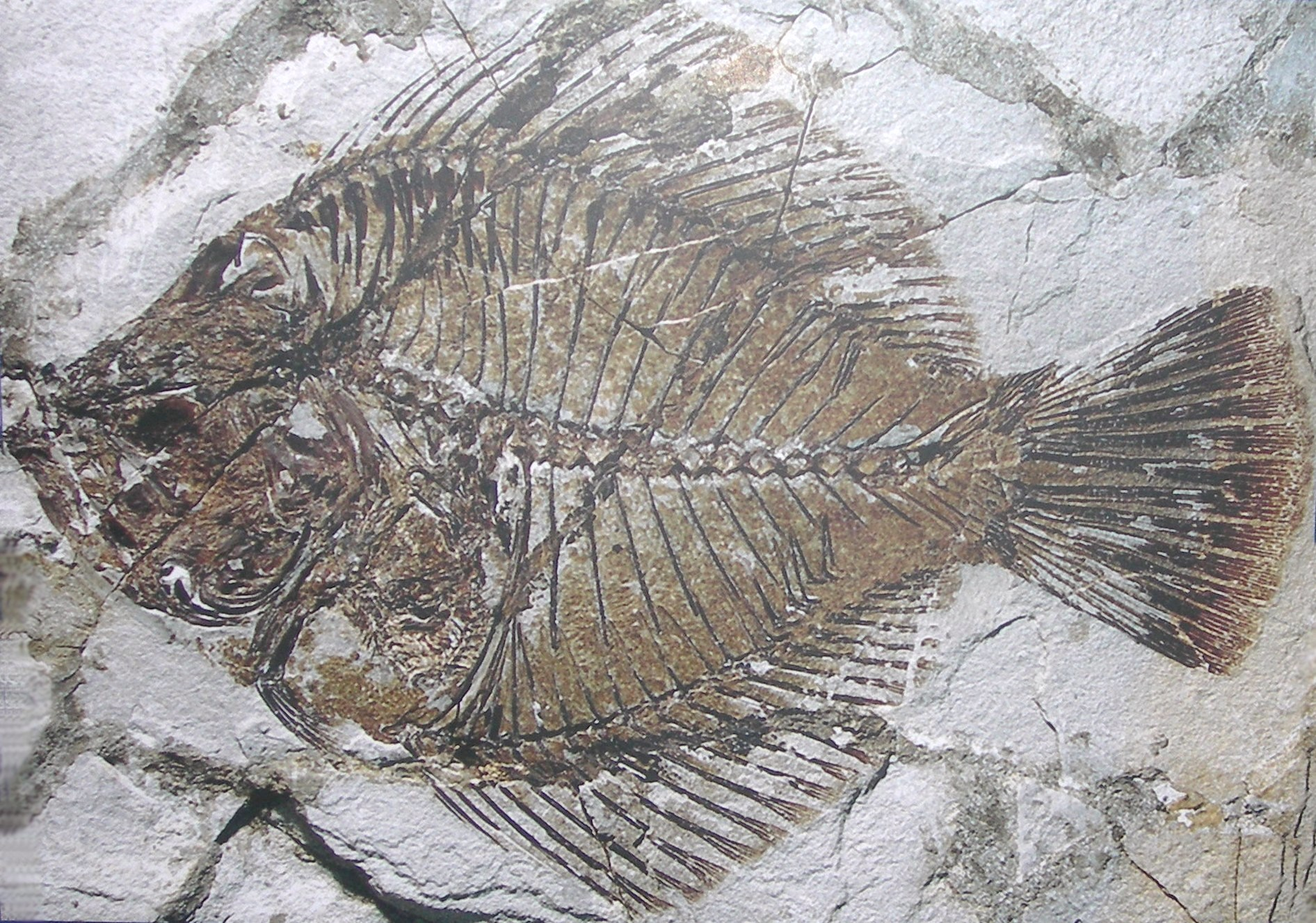

Scientific classification
- Kingdom: Animalia
- Phylum: Chordata
- Class: Actinopterygii
- Order: Carangiformes
- Suborder: Pleuronectoidei
- Family: †Amphistiidae; Boulenger, 1902
- Genus: †Amphistium; Agassiz, 1844

Species
- A. altum Gaudant, 1979; A. paradoxum Agassiz, 1844

= Amphistium =

Amphistium Temporal range: Ypresian to Lutetian

Extinct genus of fishes

Amphistium (from Greek: ἀμφί amphi, 'on both sides', Greek: ιστίον istion 'sail') is an extinct genus of early flatfish from the early to middle Eocene of Europe, and the only member of the family Amphistiidae. It is one of the earliest known fish to have nearly evolved the typical flatfish body plan.

Two species are known:

- A. altum Gaudant, 1979 - Middle Eocene (Lutetian) of France (Lutetian limestone)
- A. paradoxum Agassiz, 1844 (type species) - Early Eocene of Italy (Monte Bolca)

The type species, A. paradoxum, was initially identified in 1796 by Giovanni Serafino Volta as a specimen of the European plaice (Pleuronectes platessa), an identification retained in an 1818 revision by de Blainville. It was only in 1835 that it was placed in its own genus and species by Agassiz, properly described as Amphistium paradoxum in 1844. Another species from Bolca, A. bozzianum Massalongo, 1859, is now considered synonymous with paradoxum, although some early authorities retained it as distinct.

Due to its balance of basal and derived traits, it is considered an important transitional fossil in understanding the evolution of flatfish. In a typical modern flatfish, the head is asymmetric with both eyes on one side of the head. In Amphistium, the transition from the typical symmetric head of a vertebrate is incomplete, with one eye placed near the top of the head.

Amphistium is among the many fossil fish species known from the Monte Bolca Lagerstätte of Ypresian Italy. Heteronectes is a related, and very similar fossil from that coexisted with A. paradoxum in Bolca. Heteronectes is sometimes also placed in the family Amphistiidae, though other studies find it to be more basal than any other flatfish taxon.
