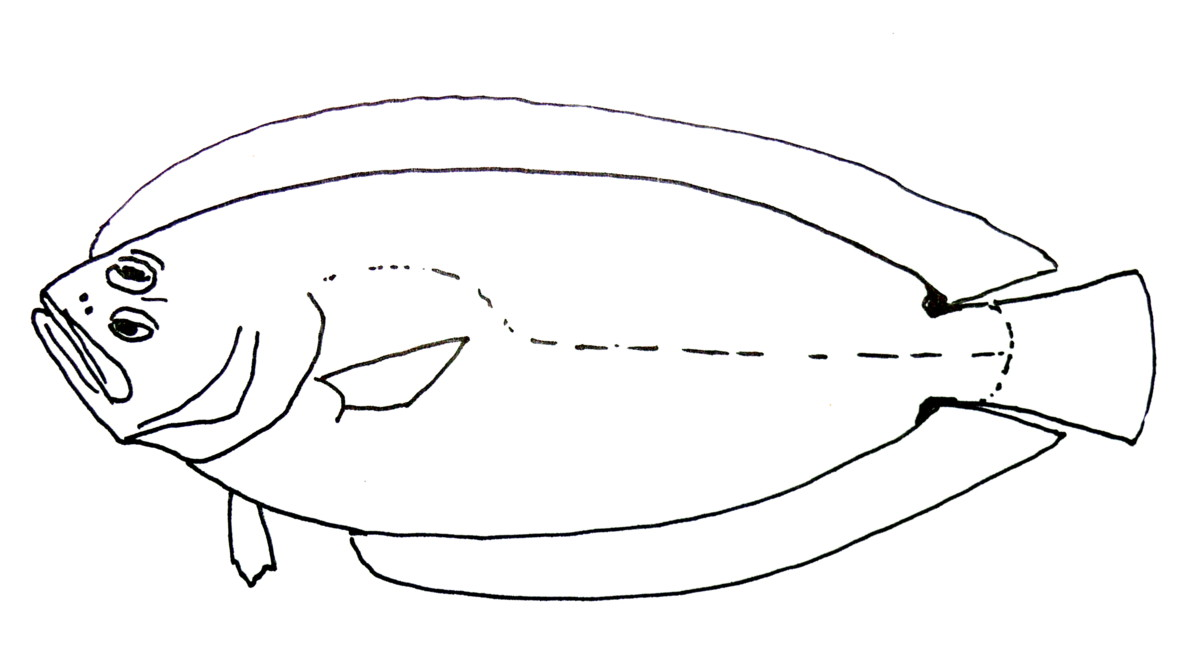
- Citharoides macrolepis

Scientific classification
- Kingdom: Animalia
- Phylum: Chordata
- Class: Actinopterygii
- Clade: Percomorpha
- Order: Carangiformes
- Suborder: Pleuronectoidei
- Family: Citharidae de Buen, 1935

Type genus
- Citharus Artedi, 1793

Subfamilies
- Brachypleurinae; Citharinae

= Citharidae =

Citharidae Temporal range: Eocene–present

Family of flatfishes

The Citharidae or largescale flounders are a small family of flounders with four genera. Three genera are restricted to the Indo-Pacific, while Citharus is from the Mediterranean and East Atlantic (off northwest Africa). There are a total of seven species. Species reach lengths ranging between 14 and 36 centimetres (5.5 and 14.2 in).

Taxa include:

- Subfamily Brachypleurinae
  - Genus Brachypleura
    - Brachypleura novaezeelandiae – yellow-dabbled flounder
  - Genus Lepidoblepharon
    - Lepidoblepharon ophthalmolepis – scale-eyed flounder
- Subfamily Citharinae
  - Genus Citharoides
    - Citharoides axillaris
    - Citharoides macrolepidotus – branched ray flounder
    - Citharoides macrolepis – twospot largescale flounder
    - Citharoides orbitalis
  - Genus Citharus
    - Citharus linguatula – spotted flounder

The extinct genus †Rhombocitharus Schwarzhans, 1994 is known from fossil otoliths from the early-mid Eocene of Denmark, the Oligocene of Germany, and the Oligocene to Miocene of New Zealand.
