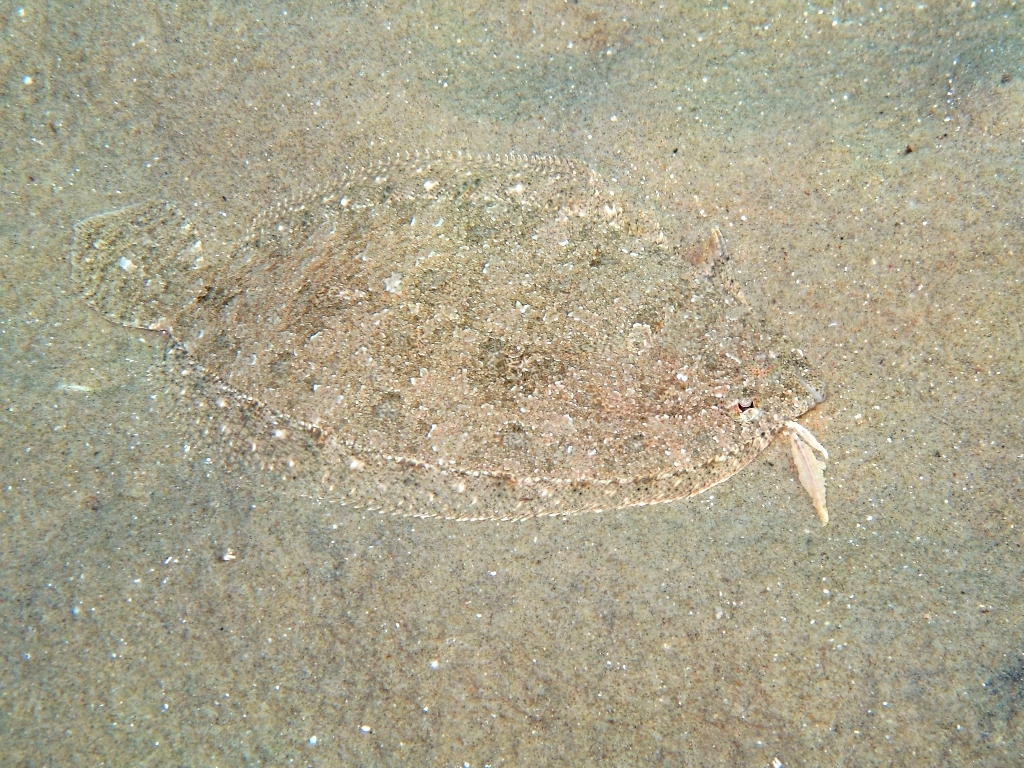

Conservation status
- Data Deficient (IUCN 3.1)

Scientific classification
- Kingdom: Animalia
- Phylum: Chordata
- Class: Actinopterygii
- Order: Carangiformes
- Suborder: Pleuronectoidei
- Family: Bothidae
- Genus: Arnoglossus
- Species: A. thori

Binomial name
- Arnoglossus thori Kyle, 1913

Synonyms
- Kyleia thori (Kyle, 1913); Arnoglossus thory Kyle, 1913; Pleuronectes grohmanni Bonaparte, 1837; Arnoglossus moltonii Torchio, 1961; Arnoglossus moltoni Torchio, 1961

= Thor's scaldfish =

Species of fish

Thor's scaldfish (Arnoglossus thori) is a species of bottom feeder benthic fish belonging to the family Bothidae (lefteye flounder). It is widespread in the Eastern Atlantic from Ireland to Sierra Leone and Cape Verde, and also found in the western Mediterranean and Black Sea. It is a marine, subtropical, demersal fish, up to 18 cm in length.
