= Kuronuma =

Kuronuma (written: 黒沼 lit. "black marsh") is a Japanese surname. Notable people with the surname include:

- Katsuzo Kuronuma (黒沼 勝造, 1908–1992), Japanese ichthyologist
- Ken Kuronuma (黒沼 健, 1902–1985), pen-name of Japanese writer and screenwriter
- Yuriko Kuronuma (黒沼 ユリ子, born 1940), Japanese violinist

== Fictional characters ==
- Sawako Kuronuma (黒沼 爽子), protagonist of the manga series Kimi ni Todoke
- Aoba Kuronuma (黒沼 青葉), a character in the light novel series Durarara!!
