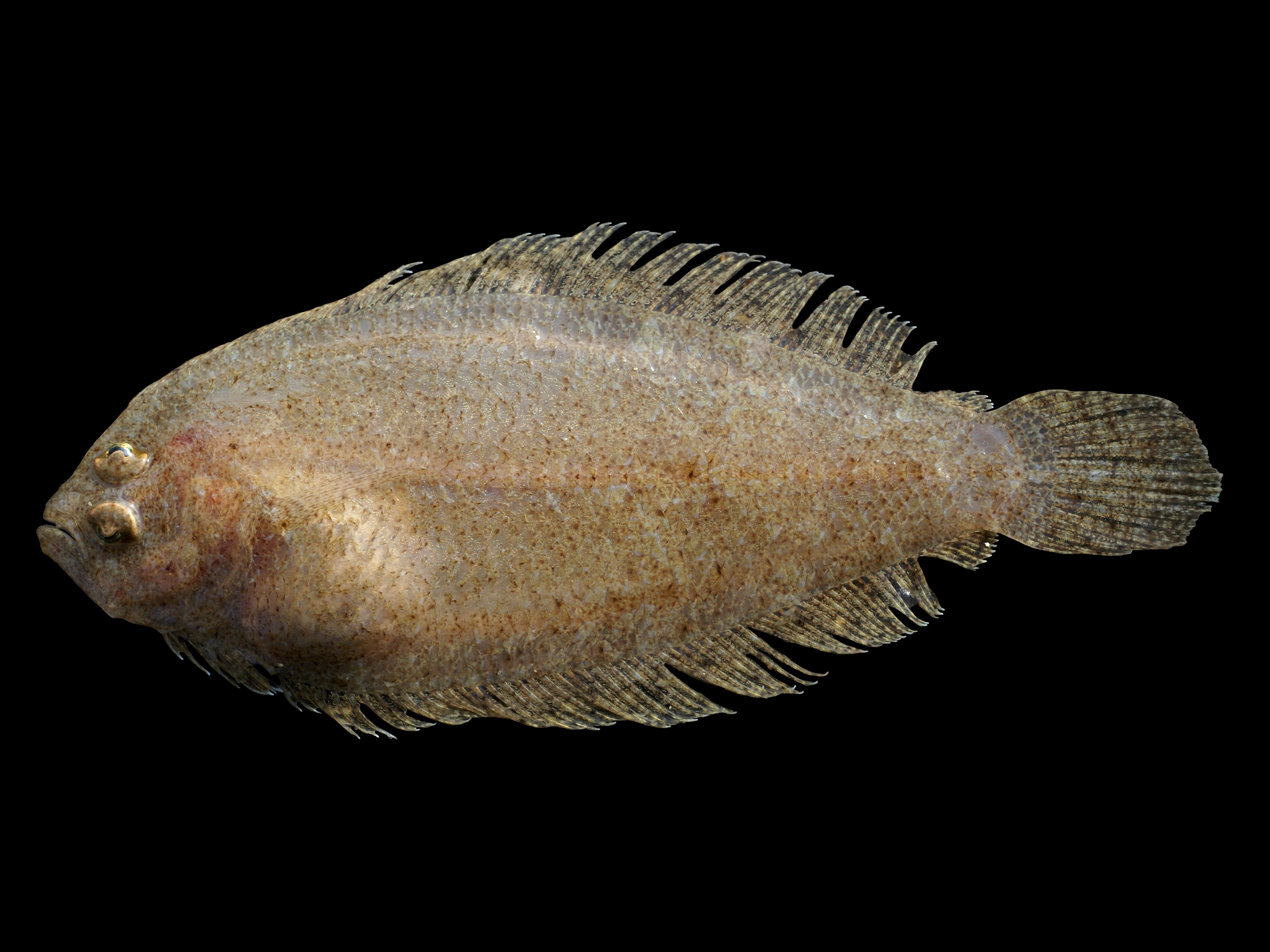
- A fully grown scaldfish from the southern North Sea
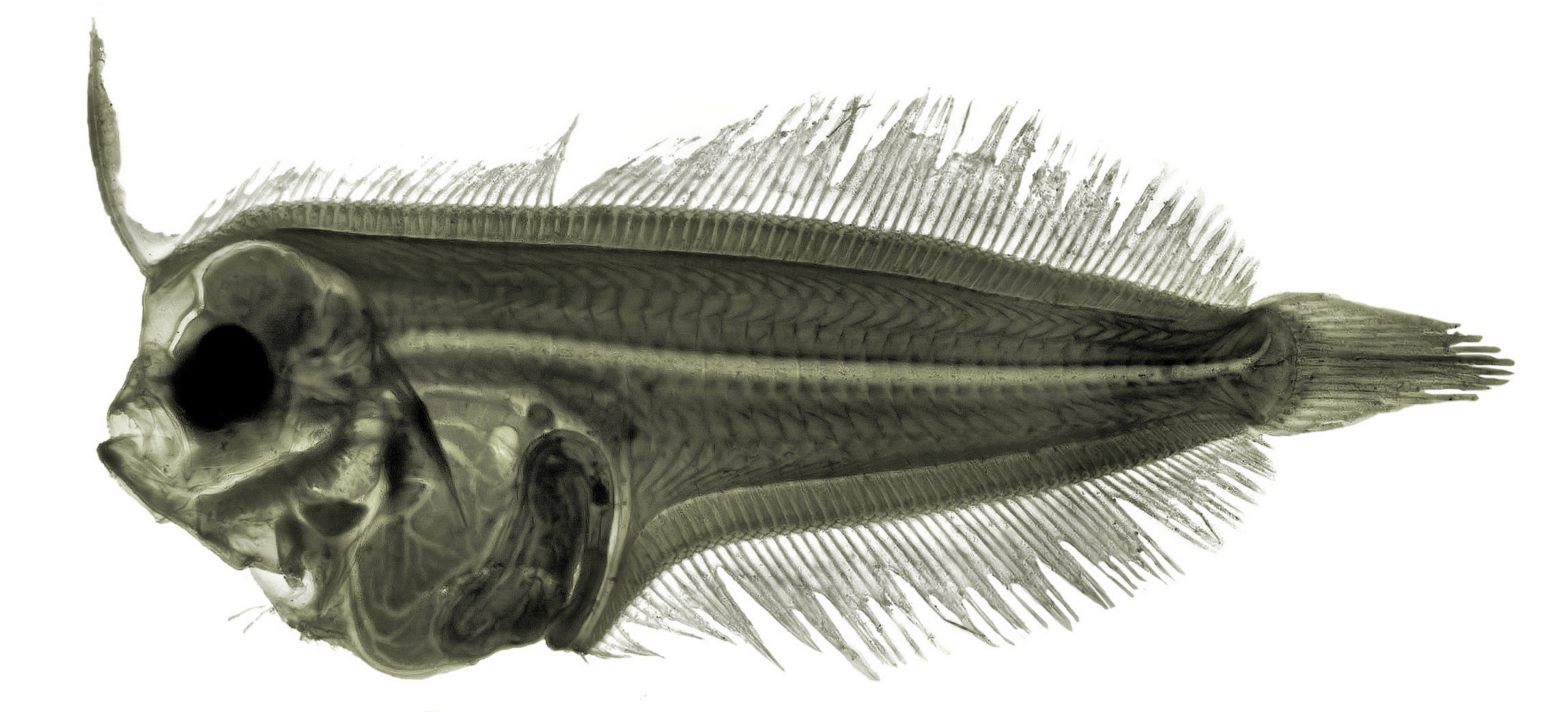
- A scaldfish larva, measuring approximately 9 millimetres (0.35 in) in length

Conservation status
- Least Concern (IUCN 3.1)

Scientific classification
- Kingdom: Animalia
- Phylum: Chordata
- Class: Actinopterygii
- Division: Teleostei
- Order: Carangiformes
- Suborder: Pleuronectoidei
- Family: Bothidae
- Genus: Arnoglossus
- Species: A. laterna

Binomial name
- Arnoglossus laterna (Walbaum, 1792 )

Synonyms
- Arnoglossus macrostoma Kyle, 1913; Pleuronectes arnoglossus Bloch & Schneider, 1801; Pleuronectes conspersus Canestrini, 1861; Pleuronectes diaphanus Shaw, 1803; Pleuronectes laterna Walbaum, 1792; Pleuronectes leotardi Risso, 1810; Pleuronectes pellucidus Nardo, 1824; Rhombus soleaeformis Malm, 1865

= Mediterranean scaldfish =

Species of fish

The Mediterranean scaldfish (Arnoglossus laterna), also known as the scaldfish, is a species of benthic left eyed flatfish belonging to the family Bothidae. It is found in the eastern Atlantic of Europe and Africa as well as the Mediterranean, and is of minor interest to fisheries.

== Description ==
The Mediterranean scaldfish is a small flatfish with a slender oval body, a small head with large eyes placed on the left side of the head. It has an oblique mouth which is moderately sized. The dorsal fin has its origin in front of its upper eye, the first dozen or so dorsal fin rays are partially fee from the fin membrane, although they are not elongated. The pelvic fin on the eyed side has a long bas and is larger than its equivalent on its blind side. It has 87–93 rays in its dorsal fin and 65–74 rays in the anal fin. Its scales are thin and fragile and there are usually very few on its body. It is pale brownish grey in colour with dark spots on its body and fins, with a dusky spot on the pelvic fins. The lateral line has 50–56 scales. It is a sexually dimorphic species in which the males are distinguished by having an unusual appearance with of certain fin rays being elongated. This species grows up to 25 cm in total length.

== Distribution ==
The Mediterranean scaldfish has a wide distribution which extends from Trondheim in the north southwards along the eastern Atlantic Ocean to Angola. It also extends into the Mediterranean Sea and the Black Sea, as well as Madeira.

== Habitat and biology ==
The Mediterranean scaldfish is found on the upper part of the continental shelf where it has a benthic habit on mixed or muddy substrates down to about 200m and feeds on small fishes and invertebrates. Their breeding season is from May to August. It metamorphoses into an adult from a larva when it is between 16mm and 23mm in length and off the coast of Brittany it may live for up to eight years.

== Fisheries ==
The Mediterranean scaldfish is of minor commercial importance and the catch tends to be sold in local markets. In the northeastern Mediterranean it is normally discarded from bottom trawl catches. It is caught in commercial trawlers as by-catch in the eastern central Atlantic but again it is usually discarded. Some of this by-catch by industrial fisheries is utilized by artisanal fisheries and is consumed in fresh or dried form.
