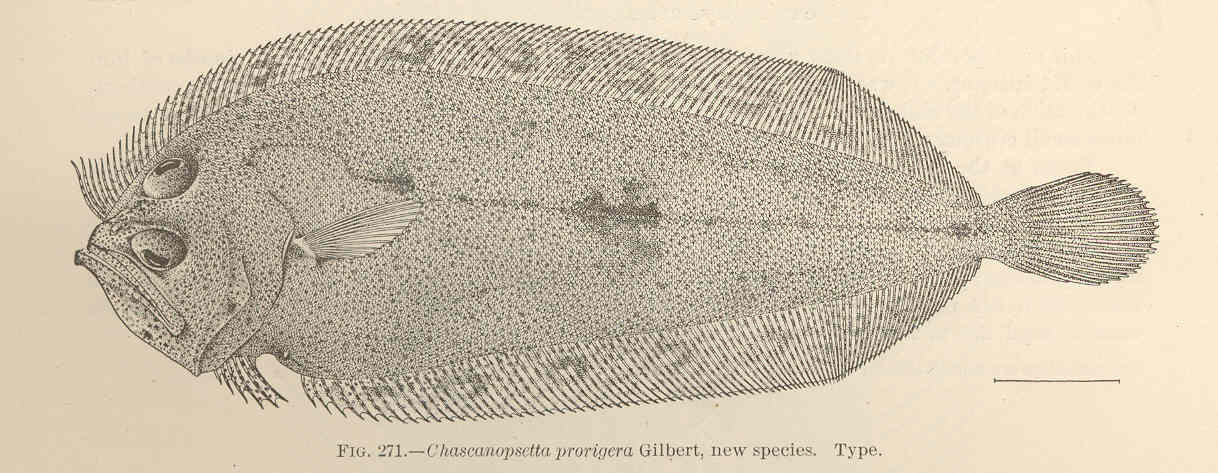

Conservation status
- Least Concern (IUCN 3.1)

Scientific classification
- Kingdom: Animalia
- Phylum: Chordata
- Class: Actinopterygii
- Division: Teleostei
- Order: Carangiformes
- Suborder: Pleuronectoidei
- Family: Bothidae
- Genus: Chascanopsetta
- Species: C. prorigera

Binomial name
- Chascanopsetta prorigera Gilbert, 1905

= Chascanopsetta prorigera =

Species of fish

Chascanopsetta prorigera is a species of pleuronectiformes in the of family Bothidae. It was discovered by American ichthyologist Charles Henry Gilbert in 1905 off the coast of Maui, Hawaii. They live in deep-sea, bathydemersal habitats, typically found at depths ranging from 267 to 400 meters. They are 18–25 mm long on average but can get to be longer than 30 mm.

Like most of this kind of fish, they are oviparous and start their life as a pelagic egg. After they hatch as larvae and grow to 10-25 mm they will undergo metamorphosis to become benthic juveniles and adults. During metamorphosis the right eye migrates to the left side, the body flattens, and the fish transitions to a benthic lifestyle. They have an average life span of about 3-4 years and reach sexual maturity at about 1.44-1.5 years. This fish has similar diets and habits to other flatfish when it comes to eating and hunting.
