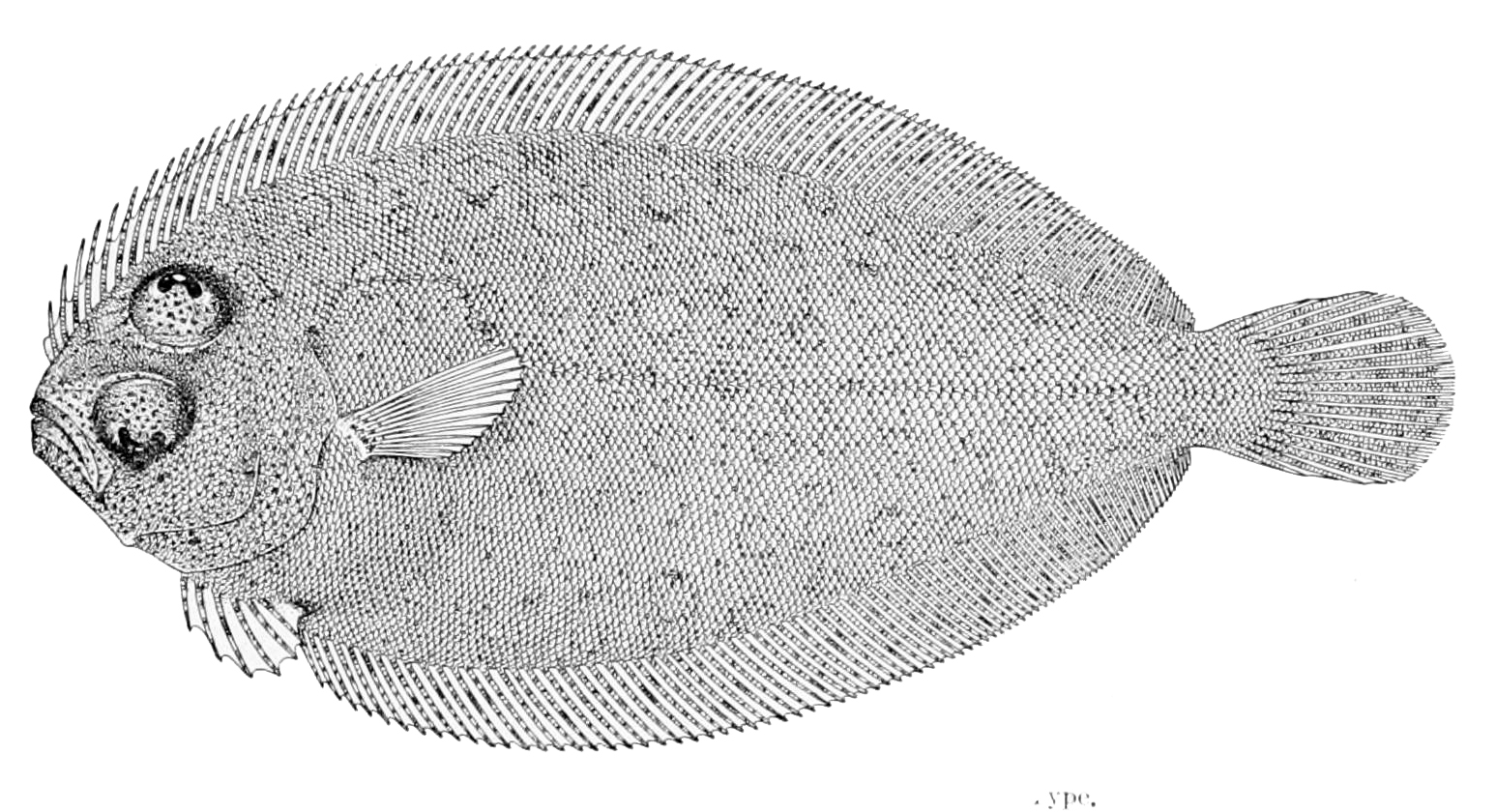

Scientific classification
- Domain: Eukaryota
- Kingdom: Animalia
- Phylum: Chordata
- Class: Actinopterygii
- Order: Carangiformes
- Suborder: Pleuronectoidei
- Family: Bothidae
- Genus: Parabothus
- Species: P. chlorospilus

Binomial name
- Parabothus chlorospilus (C. H. Gilbert, 1905)

= Parabothus chlorospilus =

Species of fish

Parabothus chlorospilus is a species of flatfish in the family Bothidae.
