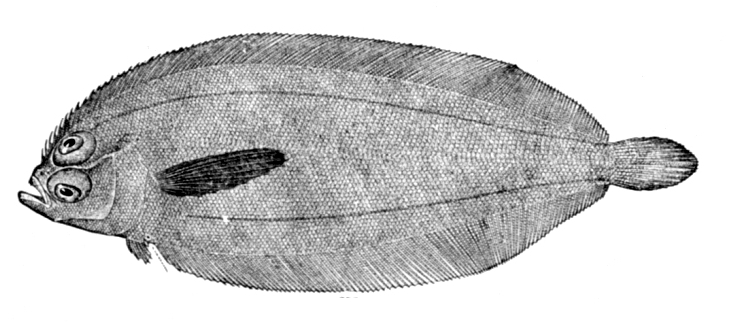
- M. atrimana
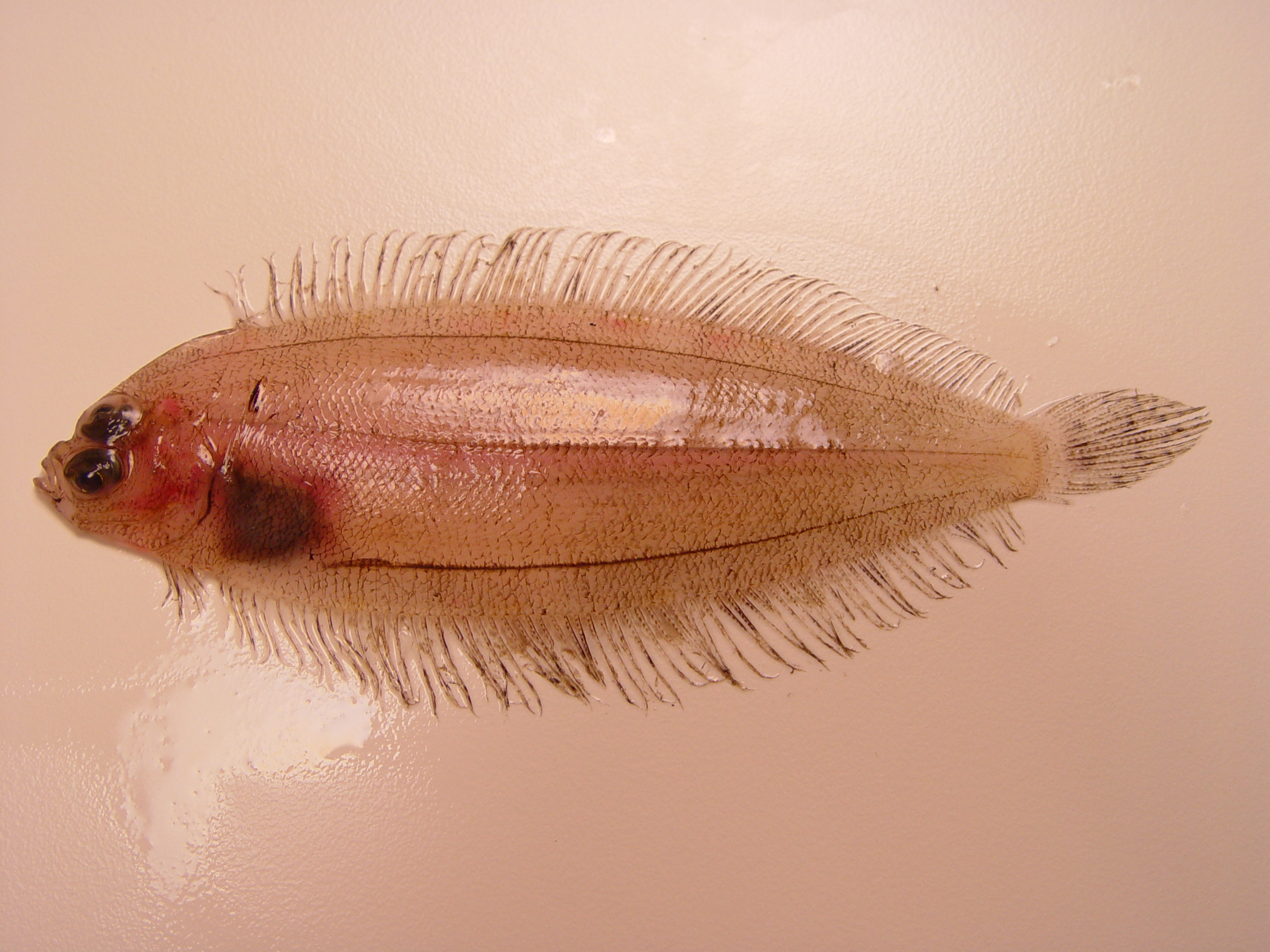
- Deepwater flounder (M. sessilicauda)

Scientific classification
- Kingdom: Animalia
- Phylum: Chordata
- Class: Actinopterygii
- Order: Carangiformes
- Suborder: Pleuronectoidei
- Family: Monolenidae; Tongboonkua, Chanet & Chen, 2025
- Genus: Monolene; Goode, 1880

Type species
- Monolene sessilicauda Goode, 1880

Synonyms
- Delothyris Goode, 1883; Thyris Goode, 1880

= Monolene =

Genus of fishes

Monolene, the deepwater lefteye flounders, is a genus of small, mainly deepwater flatfish from the Atlantic and East Pacific.

Their eyes are located on the left side of their body, and thus they have long been placed in the "lefteye flounder" family, Bothidae. However, more recent studies have split up the family into multiple families, with Monolene being identified as the sister group to the family Taeniopsettidae (formerly the subfamily Taeniopsettinae). For this reason, it was placed its own family, Monolenidae, in 2025.

== Species ==
The currently recognized species in this genus are:

- Monolene antillarum Norman, 1933 (slim flounder)
- Monolene asaedai H. W. Clark, 1936 (Asaedae flounder)
- Monolene atrimana Goode & T. H. Bean, 1886 (longfinned deepwater flounder)
- Monolene danae Bruun, 1937
- Monolene dubiosa Garman, 1899 (Acapulco flounder)
- Monolene helenensis Amaoka & Imamura, 2000
- Monolene maculipinna Garman, 1899 (Pacific deepwater flounder)
- Monolene megalepis Woods, 1961
- Monolene mertensi (Poll, 1959) (Marten's moonflounder)
- Monolene microstoma Cadenat, 1937 (smallmouth moonflounder)
- Monolene sessilicauda Goode, 1880 (deepwater flounder)
