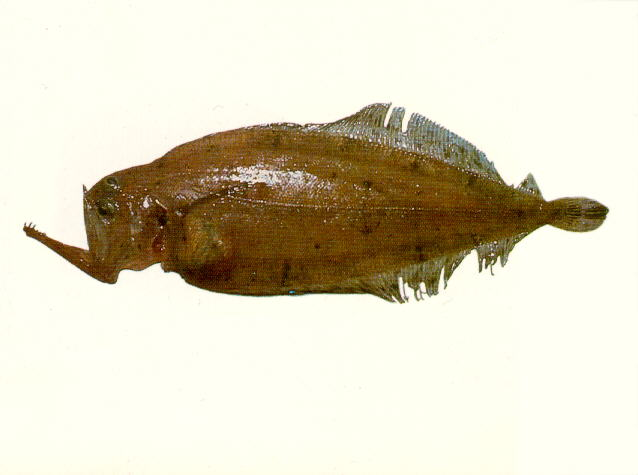

Scientific classification
- Kingdom: Animalia
- Phylum: Chordata
- Class: Actinopterygii
- Division: Teleostei
- Order: Carangiformes
- Suborder: Pleuronectoidei
- Family: Bothidae
- Genus: Kamoharaia; Kuronuma, 1940
- Species: K. megastoma

Binomial name
- Kamoharaia megastoma (Kamohara, 1936)

Synonyms
- Chascanopsetta megastoma Kamohara, 1936

= Kamoharaia =

Species of fish

Kamoharaia megastoma, the Wide-mouthed flounder, is a deepwater species of lefteye flounder native to the western Pacific Ocean. This species is usually found at depths of around 800 metres (2,600 ft). This species grows to a length of 22.5 centimetres (8.9 in) TL. This species is the only known member of its genus.
