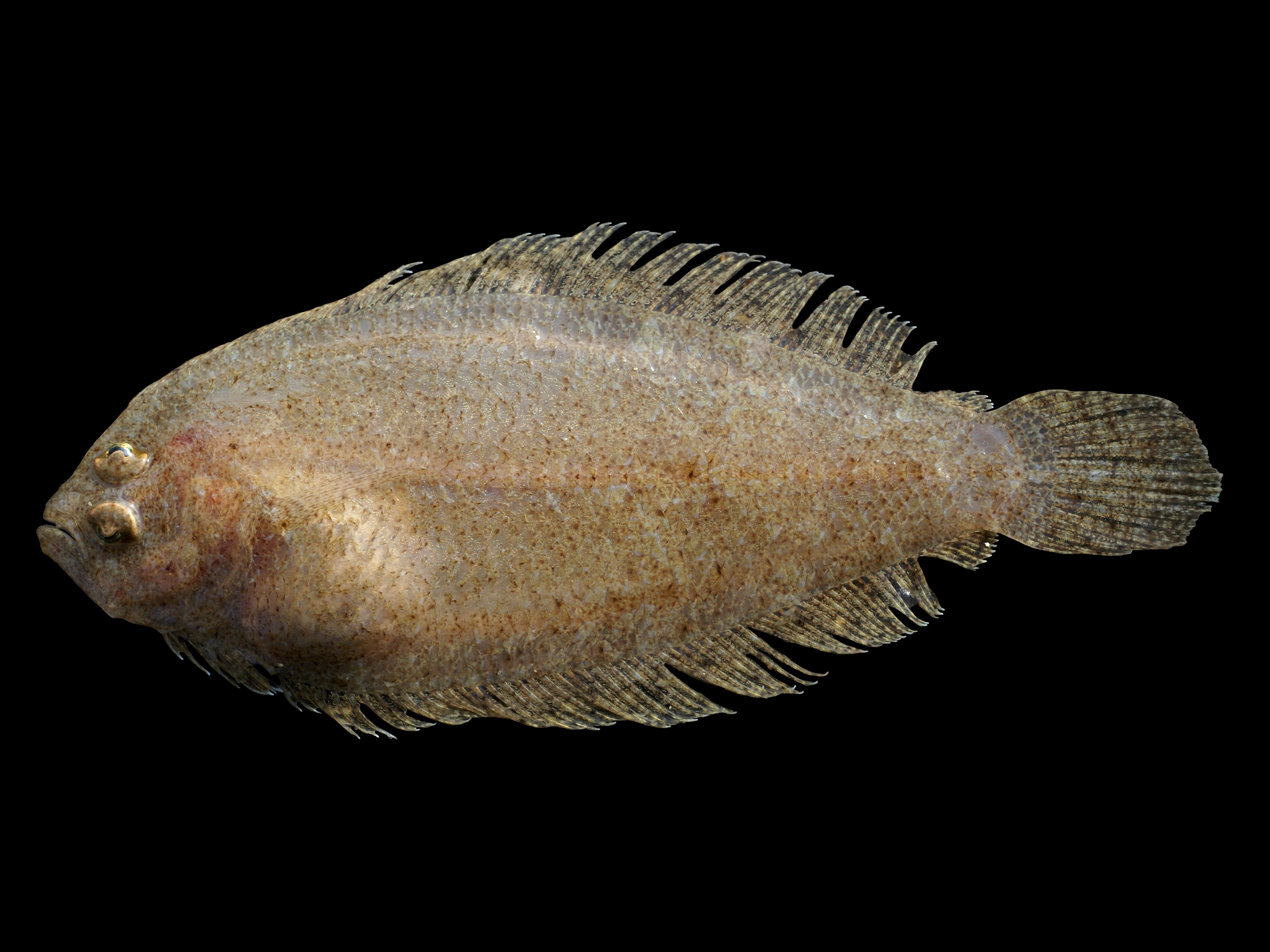
- Arnoglossus laterna

Scientific classification
- Kingdom: Animalia
- Phylum: Chordata
- Class: Actinopterygii
- Order: Carangiformes
- Suborder: Pleuronectoidei
- Family: Bothidae
- Genus: Arnoglossus; Bleeker, 1862

Type species
- Pleuronectes arnoglossus Bloch & Schneider, 1801

Synonyms
- Anticitharus Günther, 1880; Caulopsetta Gill, 1893; Charybdia Facciolà, 1885; Kyleia Chabanaud, 1931

= Scaldfish =

Scaldfish Temporal range: Early Miocene–present

Genus of fishes

The scaldfishes comprise a genus, Arnoglossus, of lefteye flounders. They are found in the Pacific, Indian and Atlantic Oceans, including the Mediterranean and Black Sea. They are entirely absent from most of the Americas; the only exceptions are A. coeruleosticta and A. multirastris found off Chile. The genus include both species found in shallow and deeper water. The largest species reaches 28 cm (11 in).

== Species ==
The 37 currently recognized species are:

- Arnoglossus andrewsi Kurth, 1954
- Arnoglossus arabicus Norman, 1939 (Arabian flounder)
- Arnoglossus armstrongi E. O. G. Scott, 1975
- Arnoglossus aspilos (Bleeker, 1851) (spotless lefteye flounder)
- Arnoglossus bassensis Norman, 1926 (Bass Strait flounder)
- Arnoglossus boops (Hector, 1875)
- Arnoglossus brunneus (Fowler, 1934) (brown lefteye flounder)
- Arnoglossus capensis Boulenger, 1898 (Cape scaldfish)
- Arnoglossus coeruleosticta (Steindachner, 1898)
- Arnoglossus dalgleishi (von Bonde, 1922) (east coast flounder)
- Arnoglossus debilis (C. H. Gilbert, 1905) (weak lefteye flounder)
- Arnoglossus elongatus M. C. W. Weber, 1913 (long lefteye flounder)
- Arnoglossus fisoni J. D. Ogilby, 1898 (Fison's lefteye flounder)
- Arnoglossus grohmanni (Bonaparte, 1837)
- Arnoglossus imperialis (Rafinesque, 1810) (imperial scaldfish)
- Arnoglossus japonicus C. L. Hubbs, 1915 (Japanese lefteye flounder)
- Arnoglossus kessleri P. J. Schmidt, 1915 (scaldback)
- Arnoglossus kotthausi Klausewitz & Schneider, 1986
- Arnoglossus laterna (Walbaum, 1792) (Mediterranean scaldfish)
- Arnoglossus macrolophus Alcock, 1889 (large-crested lefteye flounder)
- Arnoglossus marisrubri Klausewitz & M. Schneider, 1986
- Arnoglossus micrommatus Amaoka, M. Arai & M. F. Gomon, 1997
- Arnoglossus muelleri (Klunzinger, 1872) (Müller's flounder)
- Arnoglossus multirastris Parin, 1983
- Arnoglossus nigrifrons Amaoka & Mihara, 2000
- Arnoglossus nigrofilamentosus Fricke, Golani & Appelbaum-Golani, 2017 (Filamentous flounder)
- Arnoglossus oxyrhynchus Amaoka, 1969 (sharp-snout lefteye flounder)
- Arnoglossus polyspilus (Günther, 1880) (many-spotted lefteye flounder)
- Arnoglossus rueppelii (Cocco, 1844) (Rüppell's scaldback)
- Arnoglossus sayaensis Amaoka & Imamura, 1990
- Arnoglossus scapha (J. R. Forster, 1801)
- Arnoglossus septemventralis Amaoka & Mihara, 2000
- Arnoglossus tapeinosoma (Bleeker, 1865) (drab flounder)
- Arnoglossus tenuis Günther, 1880 (dwarf lefteye flounder)
- Arnoglossus thori Kyle, 1913 (Thor's scaldfish)
- Arnoglossus waitei Norman, 1926 (Waite's lefteye flounder)
- Arnoglossus yamanakai Fukui, Yamada & Ozawa, 1988

The following fossil species are also known:

- †Arnoglossus bassanianus (Kramberger, 1883) (Middle Miocene of Croatia and Kazakhstan)
- †Arnoglossus dispar Schwarzhans et al., 2024 (middle Miocene of Ukraine) [otolith]
- †Arnoglossus distinctus Svichenskaya, 1981 (early Miocene of North Caucasus, Russia)
- †Arnoglossus holleri Weinfurter, 1952 (early to middle Miocene of Europe) [otolith]
- †Arnoglossus ovalis Svichenskaya, 1981 (early Miocene of North Caucasus, Russia)
- †Arnoglossus sauvagei (Capellini, 1878) (=†Citharichthys oranensis Arambourg, 1927) (Late Miocene of Italy and Algeria)
- †Arnoglossus sumgaiticus Svichenskaya, 1981 (early Miocene of North Caucasus, Russia)
