= Engyprosopon hawaiiense =

Scientific classification
- Kingdom: Animalia
- Phylum: Chordata
- Class: Actinopterygii
- Order: Carangiformes
- Suborder: Pleuronectoidei
- Family: Bothidae
- Genus: Engyprosopon
- Species: E. hawaiiense

Binomial name
- Engyprosopon hawaiiense Jordan and Evermann, 1903

Species of bony fish

Engyprosopon hawaiiense is a species of flatfish in the family Bothidae. It is endemic to the Hawaiian Islands.
