= Arnoglossus imperialis =

Conservation status
- Least Concern (IUCN 3.1)

Scientific classification
- Kingdom: Animalia
- Phylum: Chordata
- Class: Actinopterygii
- Order: Carangiformes
- Suborder: Pleuronectoidei
- Family: Bothidae
- Genus: Arnoglossus
- Species: A. imperialis

Binomial name
- Arnoglossus imperialis (Rafinesque, 1810)

Synonyms
- Arnoglossus blachei Stauch, 1965; Arnoglossus lophotes Günther, 1862; Bothus imperialis Rafinesque, 1810; Charybdia rhomboidichthys Facciolà, 1885

Species of fish

Arnoglossus imperialis, the imperial scaldfish, is a species of flatfish from the family of left-eyed flounders, the Bothidae. It occurs in the eastern Atlantic from Scotland south to Namibia, extending into the western Mediterranean. This bottom dwelling species is sometimes caught as bycatch but is of little interest to fisheries.

== Description ==
Arnoglossus imperialis is a flatfish which has a short snout, shorter than diameter of eye. The eyes are separated by a bony ridge with the lower eye slightly in front of the upper eye. It has 95-106 rays in its dorsal fin and 74–82 in its anal fin, the males have the second to sixth dorsal fin rays elongated and thickened, in the females and it is the second to fifth. The lateral line has 51-66 scales and curves above the pectoral fin. The eyed side is greyish or brownish in colour with dark, irregular blotches; there are some small spots or blotches on the fins and in males there is a distinct black spot on posterior part of pelvic fins; in females, this spot paler and often quite indistinct. They grow to around to about 25 cm standard length.

== Distribution ==
Arnoglossus imperialis ranges along much of the eastern Atlantic from Scotland south to Namibia, including the Azores. This species is also found in the Mediterranean Sea and the Black Sea.

== Habitat and biology ==
Arnoglossus imperialis is found on sandy or muddy bottoms down to a depth of 350m, it can also be found on substrates made of shell or coral The major part of its diet is polychaete worms, although benthic crustaceans are probably also important. Off the coast of Portugal crustaceans of the order Mysidacea were the most important food item preyed on by A imperialis while an earlier study off northern France had found fish to be an important food, especially Callionymus lyra.
