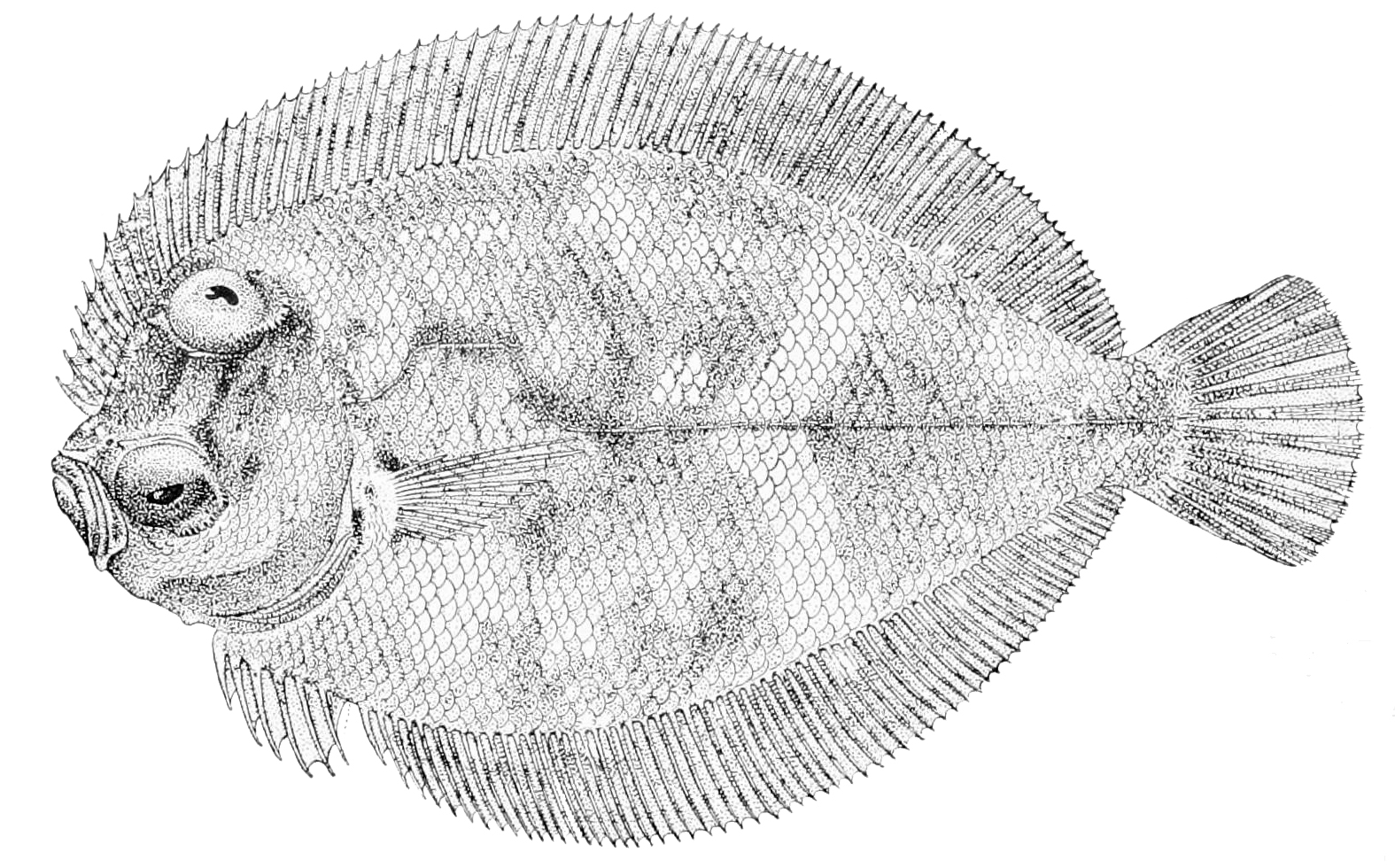

Scientific classification
- Kingdom: Animalia
- Phylum: Chordata
- Class: Actinopterygii
- Order: Carangiformes
- Suborder: Pleuronectoidei
- Family: Bothidae
- Genus: Engyprosopon
- Species: E. xenandrus

Binomial name
- Engyprosopon xenandrus Gilbert, 1905

= Engyprosopon xenandrus =

Species of fish

Engyprosopon xenandrus is a species of flatfish in the family Bothidae.
