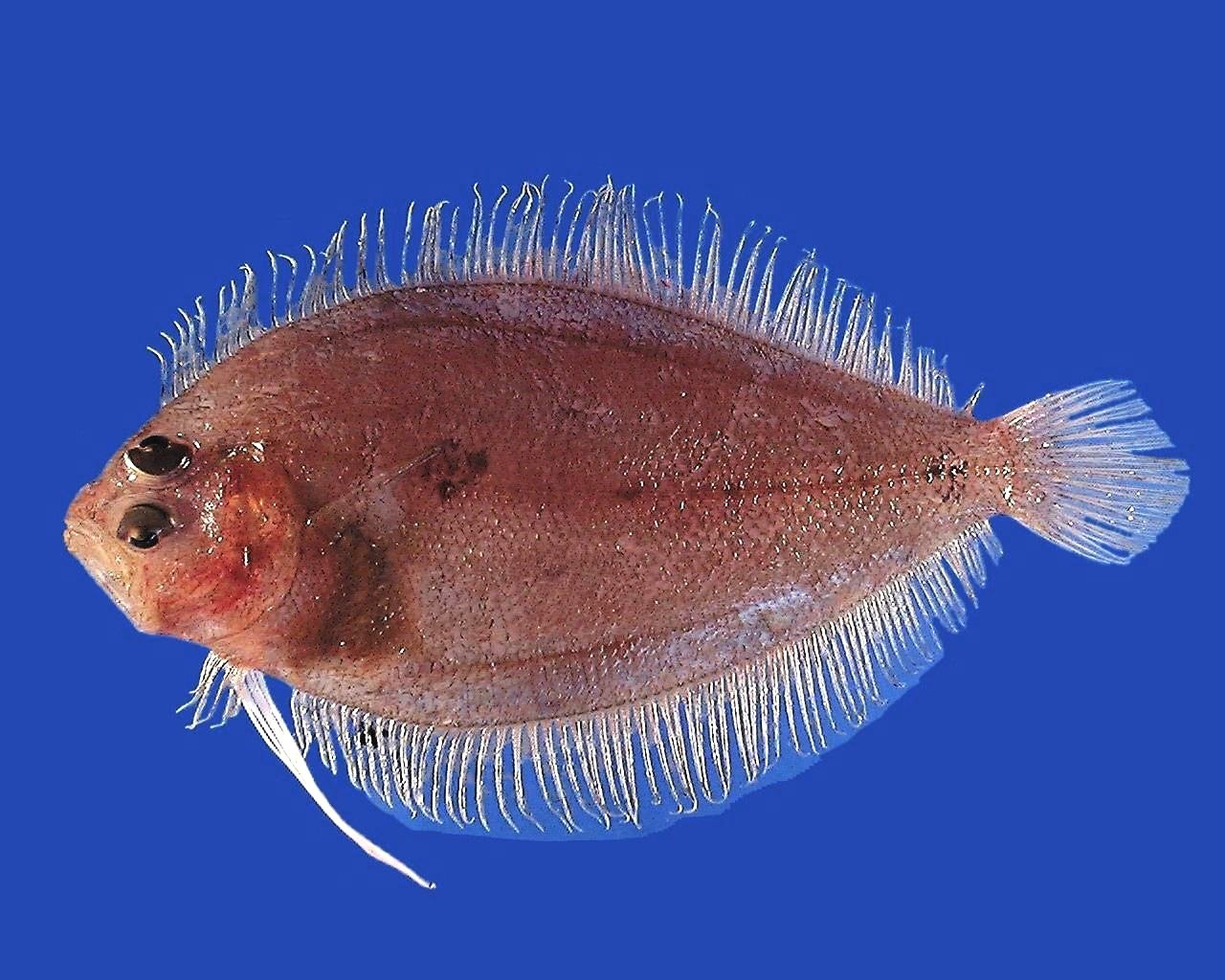
- Sash flounder (T. ventralis)

Scientific classification
- Kingdom: Animalia
- Phylum: Chordata
- Class: Actinopterygii
- Order: Carangiformes
- Suborder: Pleuronectoidei
- Family: Taeniopsettidae
- Genus: Trichopsetta; T. N. Gill, 1889

Type species
- Citharichthys ventralis Goode & Bean, 1885

= Trichopsetta =

Genus of fishes

Trichopsetta is a genus of small lefteye flounders native to the western Atlantic Ocean.

== Species ==
There are currently four recognized species in this genus:

- Trichopsetta caribbaea W. W. Anderson & Gutherz, 1967 (Caribbean flounder)
- Trichopsetta melasma W. W. Anderson & Gutherz, 1967
- Trichopsetta orbisulcus W. W. Anderson & Gutherz, 1967
- Trichopsetta ventralis (Goode & T. H. Bean, 1885) (Sash flounder)
