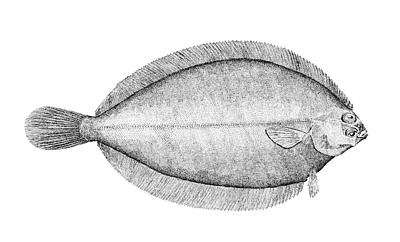

Scientific classification
- Kingdom: Animalia
- Phylum: Chordata
- Class: Actinopterygii
- Division: Teleostei
- Order: Carangiformes
- Suborder: Pleuronectoidei
- Family: Bothidae
- Genus: Arnoglossus
- Species: A. scapha

Binomial name
- Arnoglossus scapha (J. R. Forster, 1801)

Synonyms
- Pleuronectes scapha Forster, 1801

= Witch (lefteye flounder) =

Species of fish

The witch, Arnoglossus scapha, is a lefteye flounder of the family Bothidae, found around China and New Zealand, in waters less than 400 m in depth. Their length is from 20 to 40 cm.
