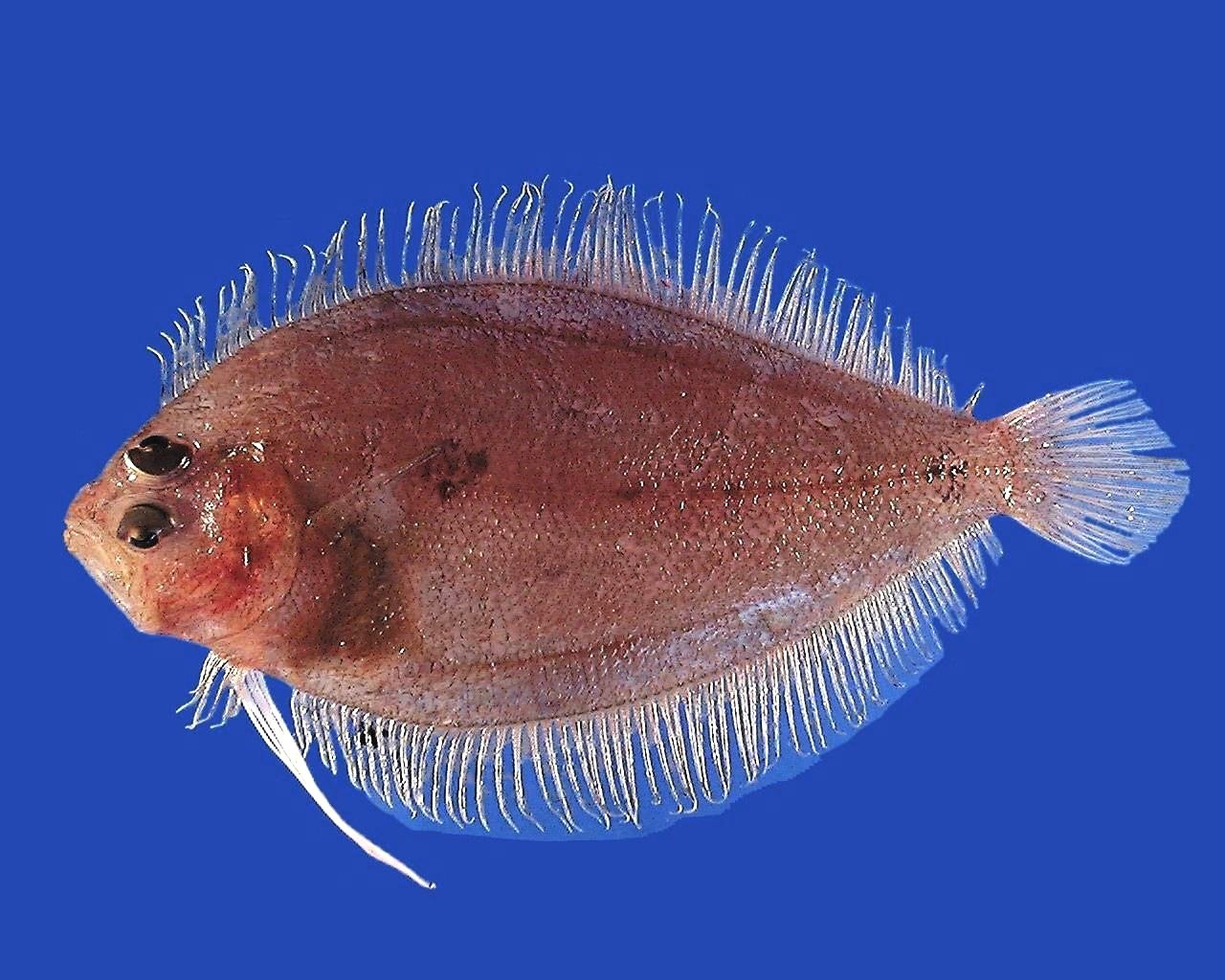
- Trichopsetta ventralis

Scientific classification
- Kingdom: Animalia
- Phylum: Chordata
- Class: Actinopterygii
- Order: Carangiformes
- Suborder: Pleuronectoidei
- Family: Taeniopsettidae; Amaoka, 1969

Genera
- Engyophrys Jordan & Bollman, 1890; Perissias Jordan & Evermann, 1898; Taeniopsetta Gilbert, 1905; Trichopsetta Gill, 1889

= Taeniopsettidae =

Family of flatfishes

Taeniopsettidae is a family of flatfish native to the Indo-Pacific and Atlantic regions.

Their eyes are located on the left side of their body, and thus they have long been treated as a subfamily of the "lefteye flounder" family, Bothidae. However, more recent studies have split up the family into multiple families, and they were thus upgraded to being their own family in 2025.

The following genera are placed in this family:

- Engyophrys Jordan & Bollman, 1890
- Perissias Jordan & Evermann, 1898
- Taeniopsetta Gilbert, 1905
- Trichopsetta Gill, 1889
