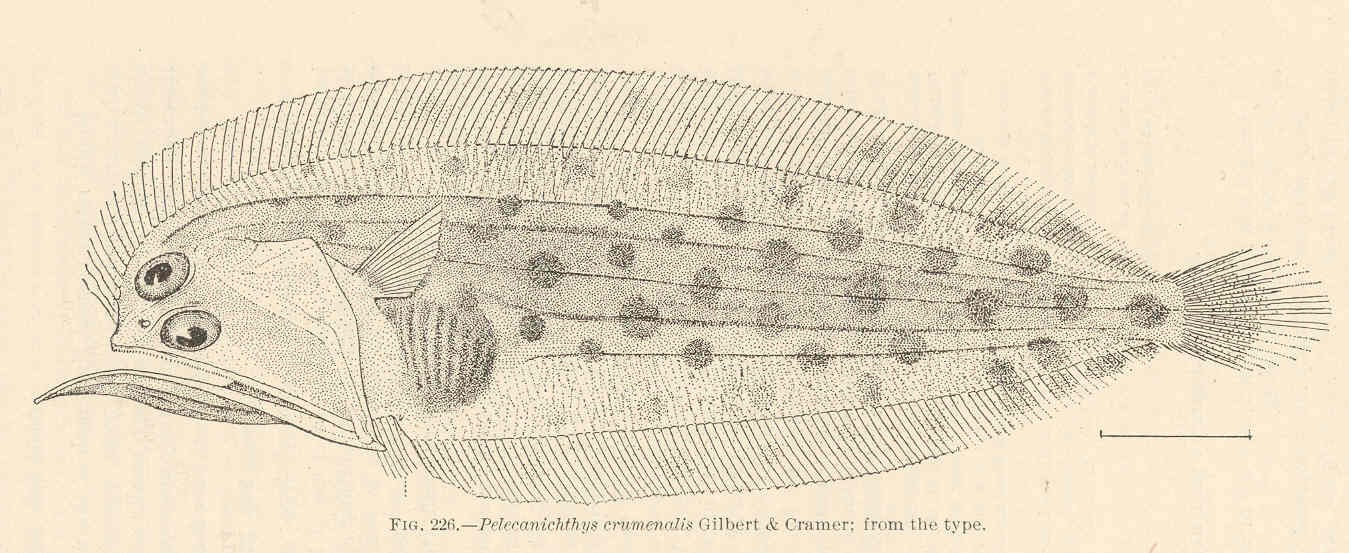

Scientific classification
- Kingdom: Animalia
- Phylum: Chordata
- Class: Actinopterygii
- Order: Carangiformes
- Suborder: Pleuronectoidei
- Family: Bothidae
- Genus: Chascanopsetta
- Species: C. crumenalis

Binomial name
- Chascanopsetta crumenalis (Gilbert and Cramer, 1897)

= Chascanopsetta crumenalis =

Species of fish

Chascanopsetta crumenalis is a species of fish in the family Bothidae. It is found in the Hawaiian Islands and possibly Madagascar.
