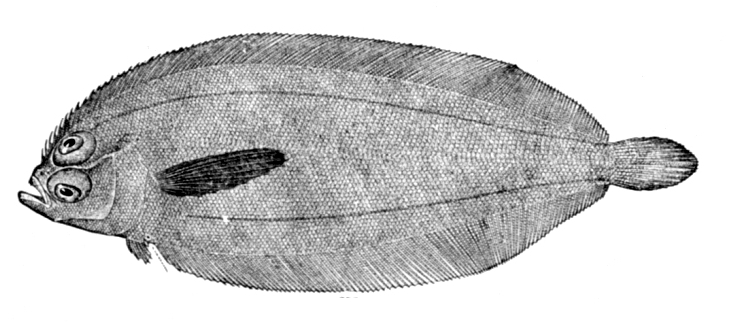

Conservation status
- Least Concern (IUCN 3.1)

Scientific classification
- Kingdom: Animalia
- Phylum: Chordata
- Class: Actinopterygii
- Order: Carangiformes
- Suborder: Pleuronectoidei
- Family: Monolenidae
- Genus: Monolene
- Species: M. atrimana

Binomial name
- Monolene atrimana Goode & T. H. Bean, 1886

= Monolene atrimana =

Species of fish

Monolene atrimana (also known as longfinned deepwater flounder) is a species of deep water fish belonging to the family Bothidae. The fish is found along the coast of Central America and South America.

== Status ==
As of 2019, IUCN has listed Monolene atrimana as Least Concern.
