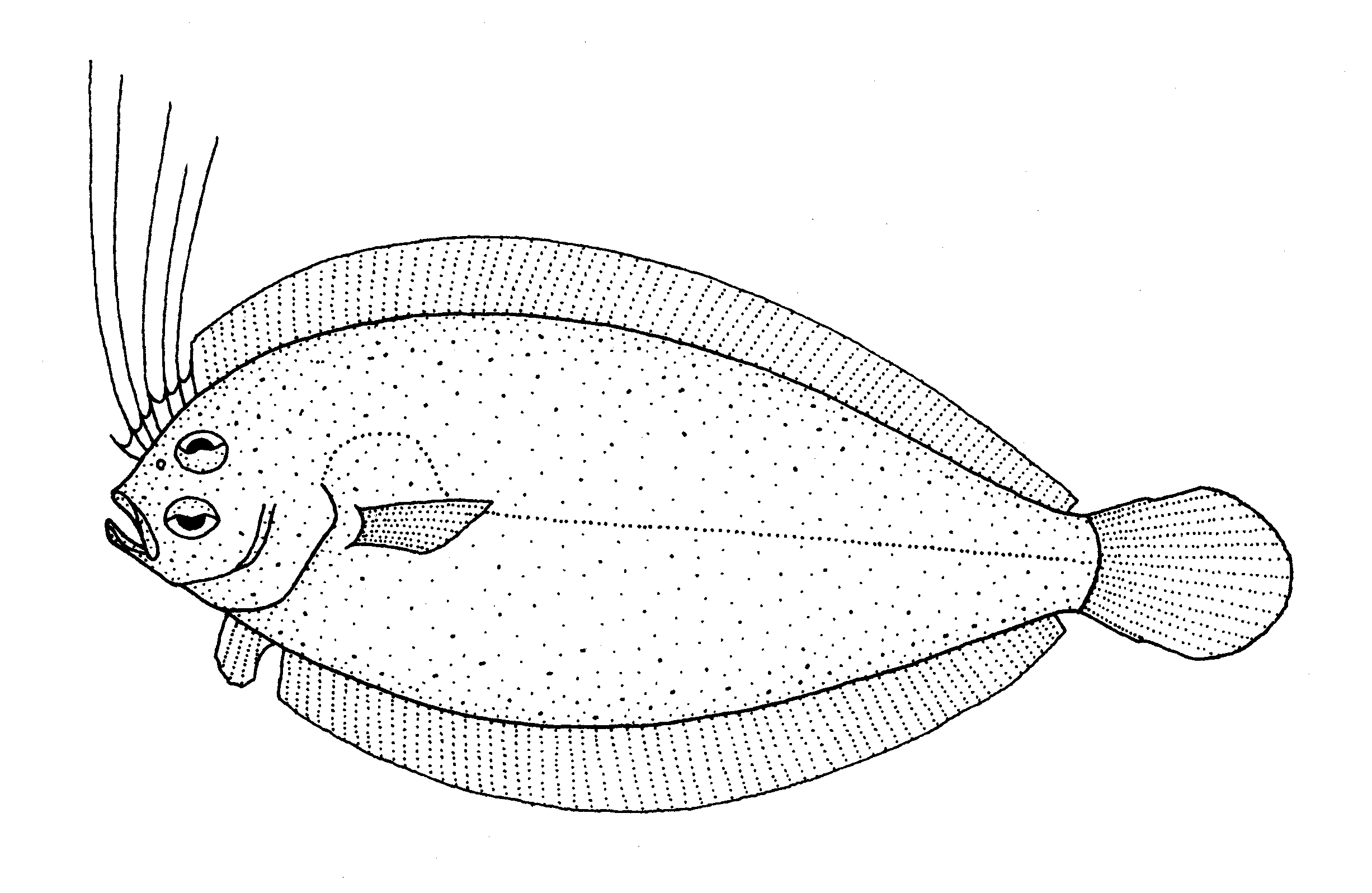
- Drawing by Dr Tony Ayling

Scientific classification
- Domain: Eukaryota
- Kingdom: Animalia
- Phylum: Chordata
- Class: Actinopterygii
- Order: Carangiformes
- Suborder: Pleuronectoidei
- Family: Bothidae
- Genus: Lophonectes
- Species: L. gallus

Binomial name
- Lophonectes gallus Günther, 1880

= Crested flounder =

Species of fish

The crested flounder, Lophonectes gallus, is a lefteye flounder of the genus Lophonectes, found around south eastern Australia, and New Zealand in waters less than 240 m in depth. Their length is from 10 to 20 cm.
