= Perissias =

Scientific classification
- Kingdom: Animalia
- Phylum: Chordata
- Class: Actinopterygii
- Order: Carangiformes
- Suborder: Pleuronectoidei
- Family: Taeniopsettidae
- Genus: Perissias; D. S. Jordan & Evermann, 1898
- Species: P. taeniopterus

Binomial name
- Perissias taeniopterus (C. H. Gilbert, 1890)

Synonyms
- Platophrys taeniopterus Gilbert, 1890

Species of fish

Perissias taeniopterus, the striped-fin flounder, is a species of lefteye flounder native to the eastern Pacific Ocean along the coast of Central America from Mexico to Panama. It is found at depths of from 46 to 157 metres (151 to 515 ft). This species grows to a length of 11 centimetres (4.3 in) TL. This species is the only known member of its genus.
