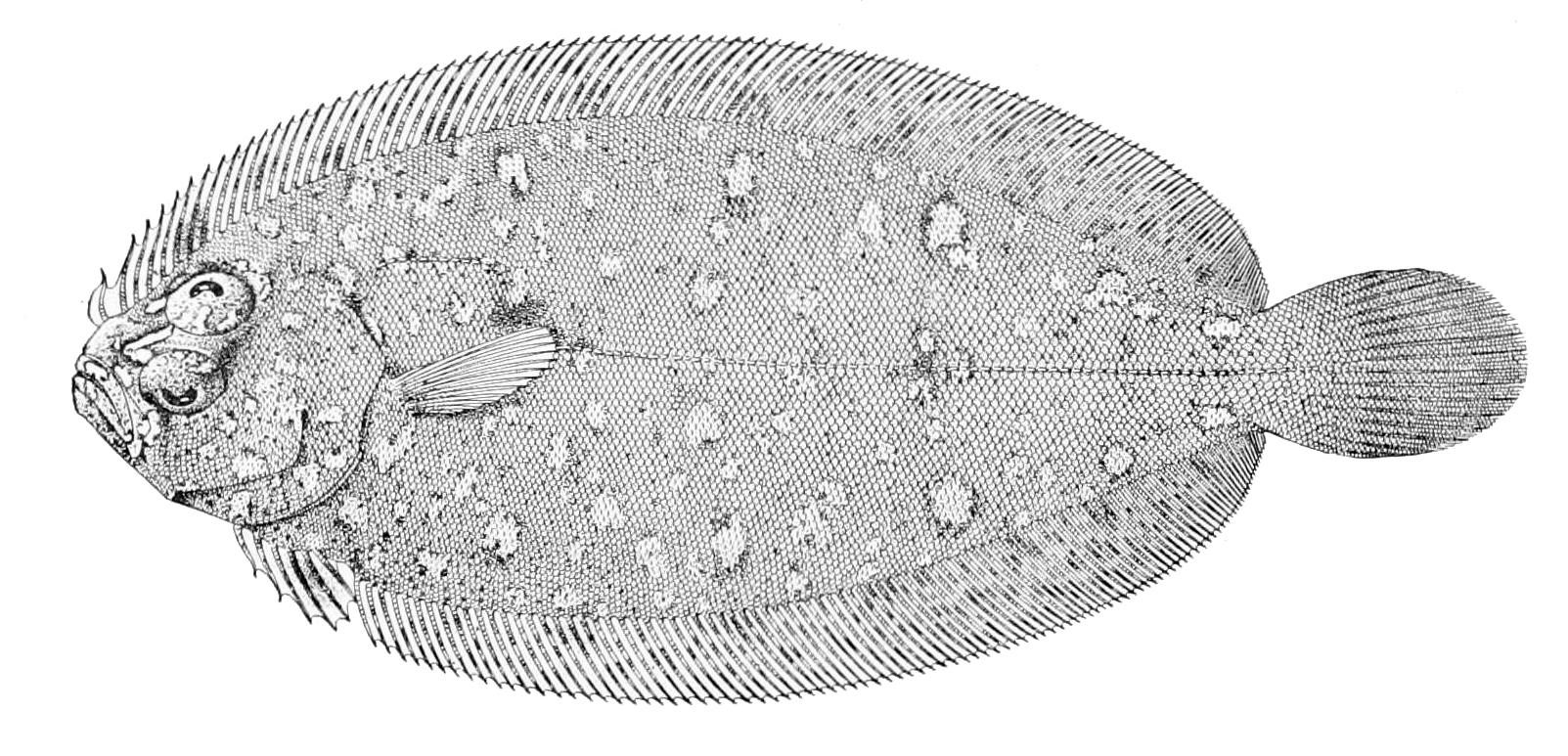
- Parabothus coarctatus

Scientific classification
- Kingdom: Animalia
- Phylum: Chordata
- Class: Actinopterygii
- Order: Carangiformes
- Suborder: Pleuronectoidei
- Family: Bothidae
- Genus: Parabothus
- Species: P. coarctatus

Binomial name
- Parabothus coarctatus (Gilbert, 1905)

= Parabothus coarctatus =

Species of fish

Parabothus coarctatus is a species of flatfish in the family Bothidae.
