= Adrian Justus =

- Born: May 12, 1970 (age 56); Mexico City, Mexico
- Genres: Classical, contemporary, folk-inspired
- Occupation: Classical violinist
- Instruments: Violin, viola, piano, clarinet
- Years active: 1980s – present

Adrian Justus is a Mexican classical violinist, recognized for his international solo performances, orchestral collaborations, and contributions to contemporary chamber music. Justus is a recipient of the Gold Medal at the Henryk Szeryng International Violin Competition and the Mozart Medal awarded by the Domecq Cultural Institute and Artists International Competition, New York.

== Early life and education ==
Adrian Justus was born in Mexico City into a Hungarian-Jewish family to Roberto Justus, a dentist and former chairman of the World Association of Orthodontists, who introduced him to the violin and was his first teacher.

Justus began formal violin studies at the age of 6 with Roberto Vazka, followed by instruction from Yuriko Kuronuma at her school in Coyoacan, Mexico City and later with Stanislav Kawalla in Jalapa, Veracruz. His early performance career began at 14 years old during a tour of Japan with the Yuriko Kuronuma Academy, where he played Gypsy Airs by Sarasate with Fujisawa Orchestra.

He later studied under Zvi Zeitlin at the Eastman School of Music, part of the University of Rochester, where he earned a Bachelor of Arts and was awarded the Performer’s Certificate. Subsequently, he received a scholarship from the Mexican National Council for Culture and the Arts to continue his studies. He further trained with Maya Glazerova in Tel Aviv and Moscow. He studied under Pinchas Zukerman in his Performance Program at the Manhattan School of Music, where he completed his master’s degree.

== Career ==
Justus began performing internationally at the age of 14, when he toured Japan as part of an ensemble led by Yuriko Kuronuma.

Over the course of his career, he has appeared as a soloist at Carnegie Hall in New York, Wigmore Hall and the Barbican Centre in London, Suntory and Kyoi Halls in Tokyo, the Tel Aviv Museum of Art, Henry Crown Hall in Jerusalem, the Muziekgebouw in Amsterdam, the Spanish Hall at Prague Castle, and Mexico City’s Palacio de Bellas Artes and Sala Nezahualcóyotl.

As an orchestral soloist, Justus has performed with the Philharmonia Orchestra (London), the Tokyo Philharmonic, the Kyoto Symphony Orchestra, and the Fujisawa Symphony Orchestra in Japan. His collaborations in Israel include the Jerusalem Symphony Orchestra, the Haifa Symphony Orchestra, and the Kibbutzim Chamber Orchestra. In Mexico, he has appeared with the National Symphony Orchestra, the OFUNAM Philharmonic, and the symphony orchestras of the State of Mexico, Xalapa, and Jalisco. He has also performed with the Prague Festival Orchestra and participated in international festivals such as the Janáček Festival in London and several cultural events across Mexico.

Justus's repertoire encompasses classical and contemporary works, including compositions by Tchaikovsky, Brahms, Mendelssohn, Mozart, and Paganini. He has premiered works by Mexican composers and interprets and records Mexican composers, including Manuel Enríquez, and performs music drawn from Jewish, Latin American, and European folk traditions. He has also contributed original compositions for violin and cadenzas for Mozart and Paganini concertos.

Justus is a professor at the National Conservatory of Mexico. His principal instruments have included the 1718 “Marlboro” Stradivarius and the 1744 “Lord Coke” Guarnerius del Gesù violin.

== Discography ==
- Sibelius Violin Concerto, with the Philharmonia Orchestra
- Tchaikovsky, Mendelssohn, Brahms, and Mozart Concertos
- Paganini: 24 Caprices
- Concertos by Manuel Enríquez
- Tapestry Contemporary Chamber Music
- Chamber music collections featuring Mexican composers

== Awards and Recognition ==
- 1988 – First Prize, National Violin Competition of Mexico
- 1992 – Gold Medal, Henryk Szeryng International Violin Competition, Mexico City
- 1997 – Mozart Medal, Domecq Cultural Institute, Mexico City
- 2002 – Artists International Competition Winner, New York
- 2024 – Award of Honor as Concert Violinist, Cultural Institute Mexico–Israel
