= Tosarhombus =

Scientific classification
- Domain: Eukaryota
- Kingdom: Animalia
- Phylum: Chordata
- Class: Actinopterygii
- Order: Carangiformes
- Suborder: Pleuronectoidei
- Family: Bothidae
- Genus: Tosarhombus; Amaoka, 1969

Type species
- Tosarhombus octoculatus Amaoka, 1969

Genus of fishes

Tosarhombus is a genus of small lefteye flounders native to the western Indian and western Pacific Oceans at depths of 124 to 500 m (407 to 1,640 ft).

== Species ==
There are currently six recognized species in this genus:

- Tosarhombus brevis Amaoka, Mihara & Rivaton, 1997
- Tosarhombus longimanus Amaoka, Mihara & Rivaton, 1997
- Tosarhombus neocaledonicus Amaoka & Rivaton, 1991
- Tosarhombus nielseni Amaoka & Rivaton, 1991
- Tosarhombus octoculatus Amaoka, 1969
- Tosarhombus smithi (J. G. Nielsen, 1964)
