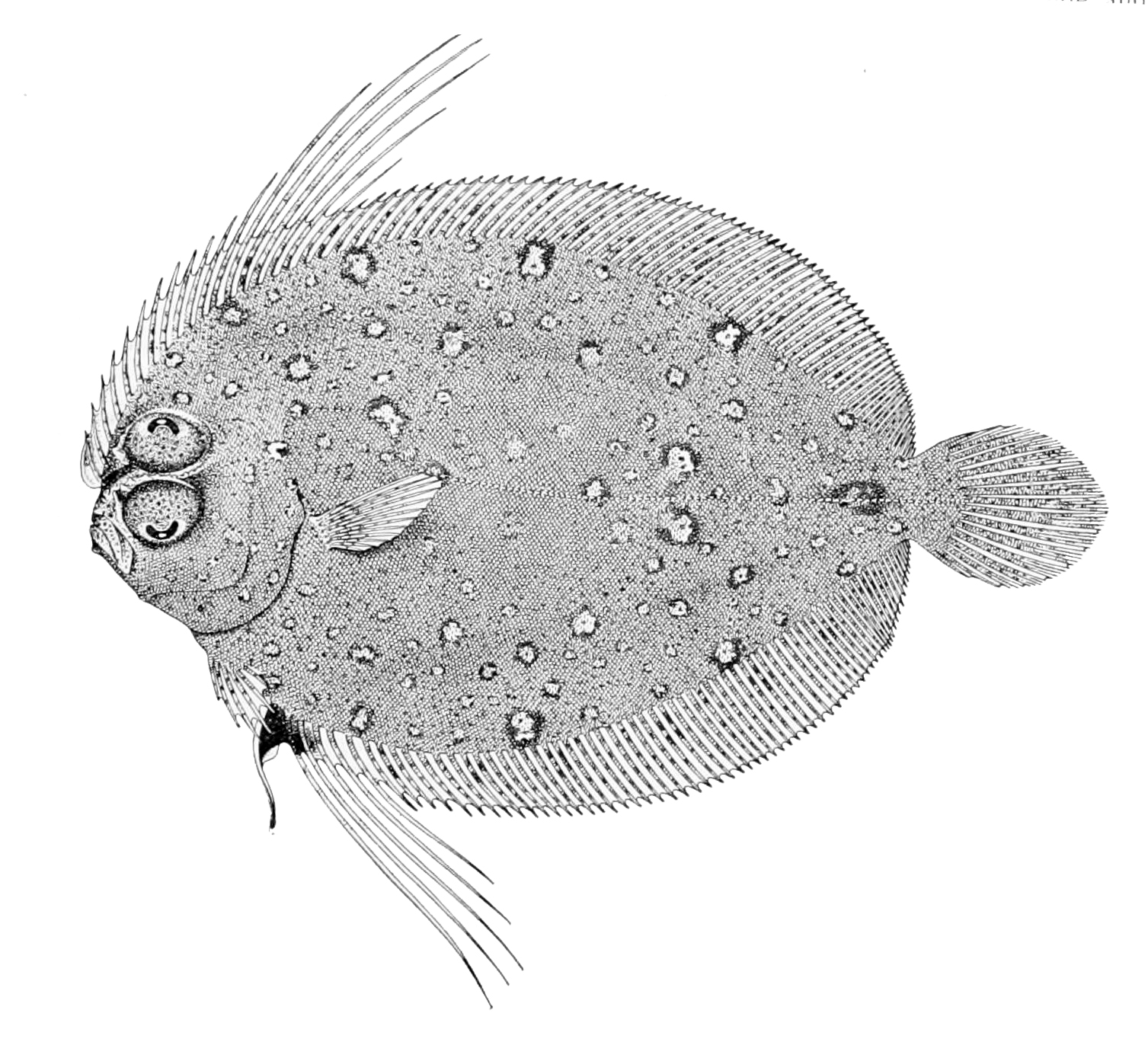
- T. radula

Scientific classification
- Domain: Eukaryota
- Kingdom: Animalia
- Phylum: Chordata
- Class: Actinopterygii
- Order: Carangiformes
- Suborder: Pleuronectoidei
- Family: Bothidae
- Genus: Taeniopsetta; C. H. Gilbert, 1905

Type species
- Taeniopsetta radula Gilbert 1905

= Taeniopsetta =

Genus of fishes

Taeniopsetta is a genus of small lefteye flounders native to the Indo-Pacific at depths of 150 to 300 m (490 to 980 ft).

== Species ==
There are currently two recognized species in this genus:

- Taeniopsetta ocellata (Günther, 1880) (Indo-Pacific ocellated flounder)
- Taeniopsetta radula C. H. Gilbert, 1905
