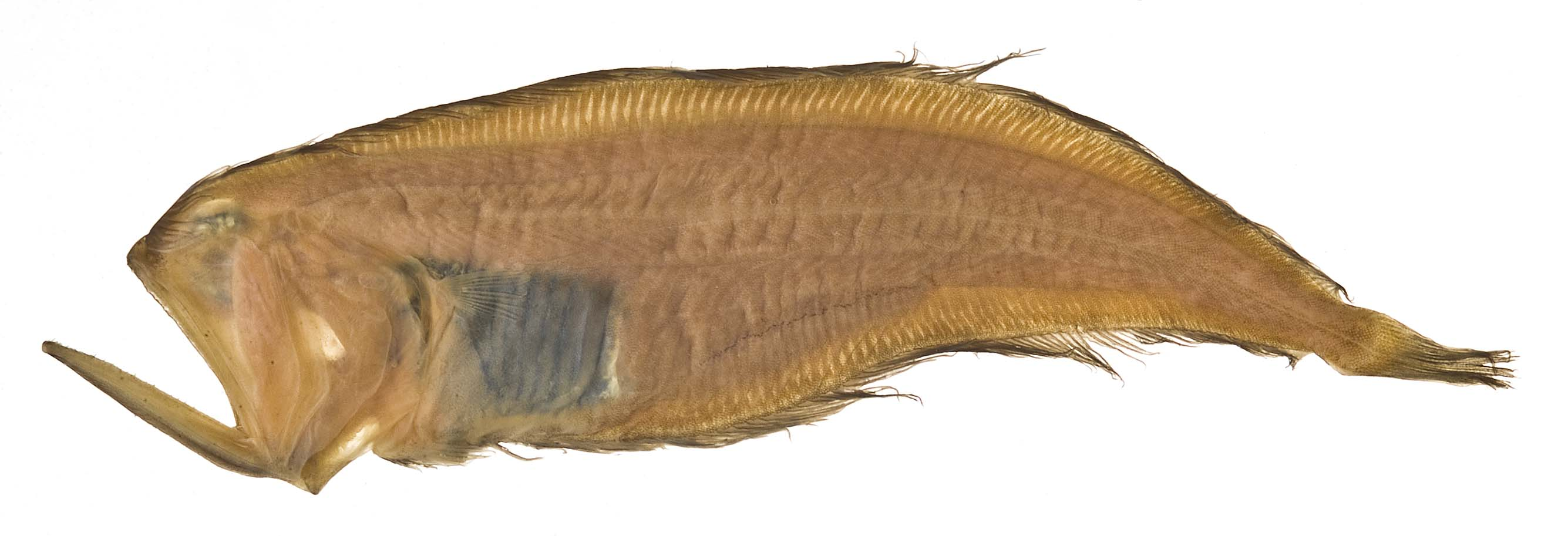

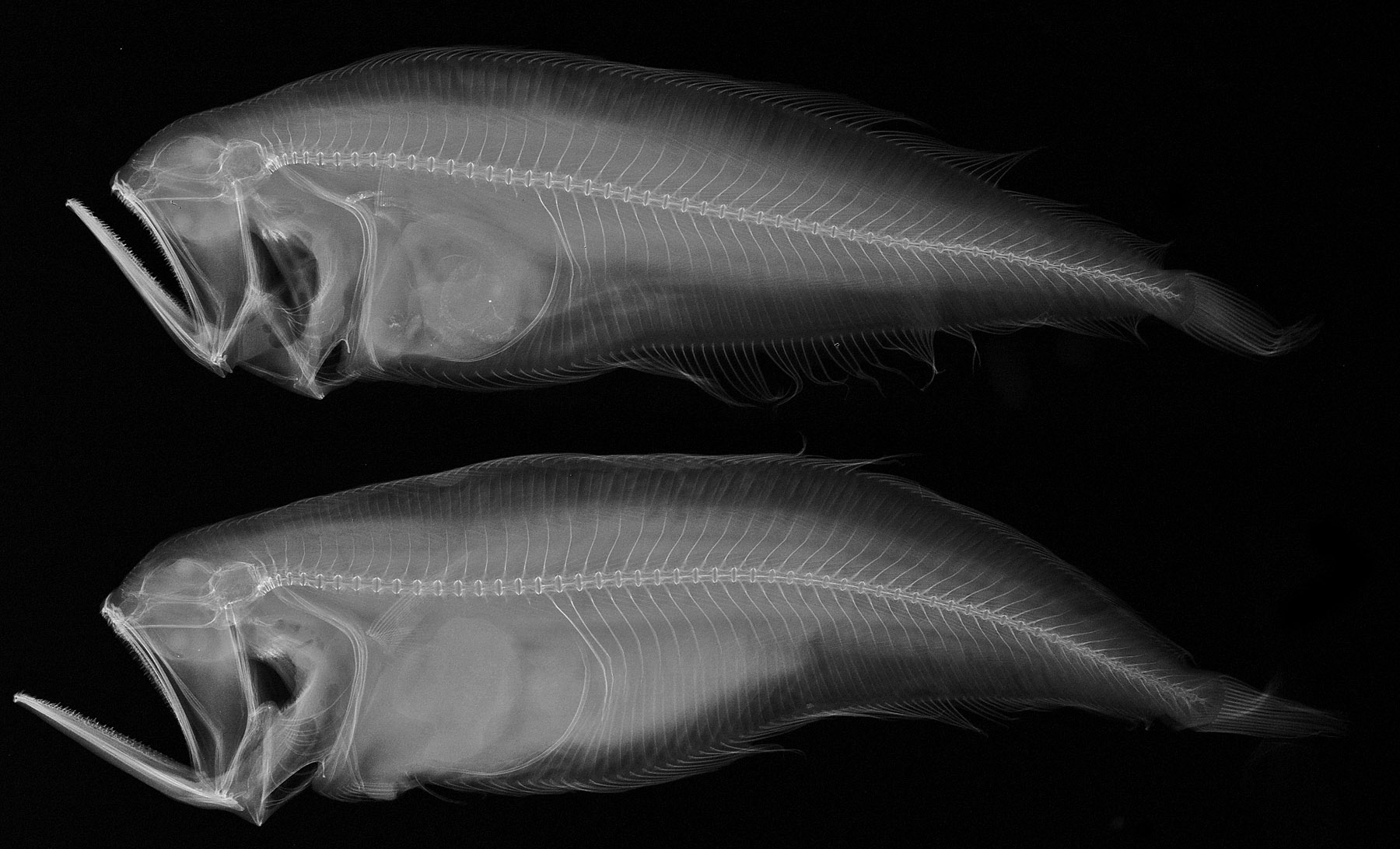
- Conventional and X-ray images of a Chascanopsetta species

Scientific classification
- Domain: Eukaryota
- Kingdom: Animalia
- Phylum: Chordata
- Class: Actinopterygii
- Order: Carangiformes
- Suborder: Pleuronectoidei
- Family: Bothidae
- Genus: Chascanopsetta; Alcock, 1894

Type species
- Chascanopsetta lugubris Alcock, 1894

Species
- See text.

Synonyms
- Pelecanichthys Gilbert & Cramer, 1897; Trachypterophrys Franz, 1910

= Chascanopsetta =

Genus of fishes

Chascanopsetta is a genus of flatfish in the family Bothidae (lefteye flounders) found in deeper parts of the Pacific and Indian Oceans with a single species, C. lugubris also occurring in the Atlantic Ocean. It contains ten member species.

== Description ==
Members of this genus have an elongate body and a relatively large mouth, the latter giving rise to the common name pelican flounder (primarily used for P. lugubris). They lack rostral, orbital, or mandibular spines.

== Species ==
There are currently ten recognized species in this genus:

- Chascanopsetta crumenalis (C. H. Gilbert & Cramer, 1897)
- Chascanopsetta elski Foroshchuk, 1991
- Chascanopsetta danae Bruun, 1937 (Angry pelican flounder)
- Chascanopsetta kenyaensis Hensley & Smale, 1997
- Chascanopsetta lugubris Alcock, 1894 (Pelican flounder)
- Chascanopsetta megagnatha Amaoka & Parin, 1990
- Chascanopsetta micrognatha Amaoka & Yamamoto, 1984
- Chascanopsetta novaeguineae Tongboonkua, Lee & Chen, 2018 (New Guinean pelican flounder)
- Chascanopsetta prognatha Norman, 1939
- Chascanopsetta prorigera (C. H. Gilbert, 1905)
