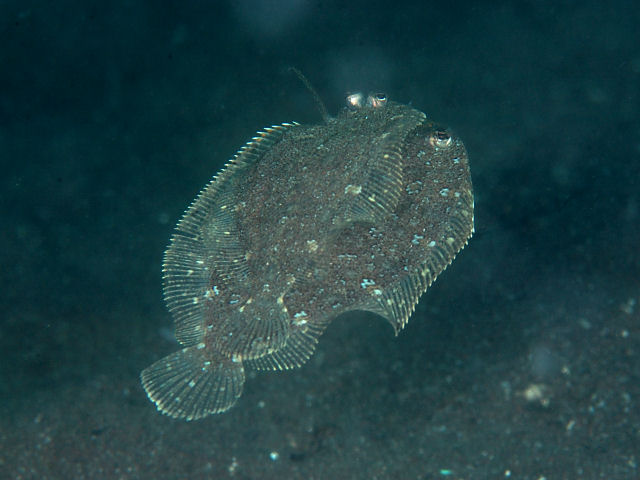
- Crossorhombus kobensis

Scientific classification
- Kingdom: Animalia
- Phylum: Chordata
- Class: Actinopterygii
- Order: Carangiformes
- Suborder: Pleuronectoidei
- Family: Bothidae
- Genus: Crossorhombus; Regan, 1920

Type species
- Platophrys dimorphus as a synonym for Crossorhombus valderostratus Gilchrist, 1904

= Crossorhombus =

Genus of fishes

Crossorhombus is a genus of small lefteye flounders native to the Indian and West Pacific Oceans.

== Species ==
There are currently six recognized species in this genus:

- Crossorhombus azureus (Alcock, 1889) (Blue flounder)
- Crossorhombus howensis (Hensley & J. E. Randall, 1993) (Lord Howe Island flounder)
- Crossorhombus kanekonis (S. Tanaka (I), 1918)
- Crossorhombus kobensis (D. S. Jordan & Starks, 1906) (Kobe flounder)
- Crossorhombus pescadores (Kunio Amaoka et al. 2026) (Pescadores Flounder)
- Crossorhombus valderostratus (Alcock, 1890) (Broadbrow flounder)
