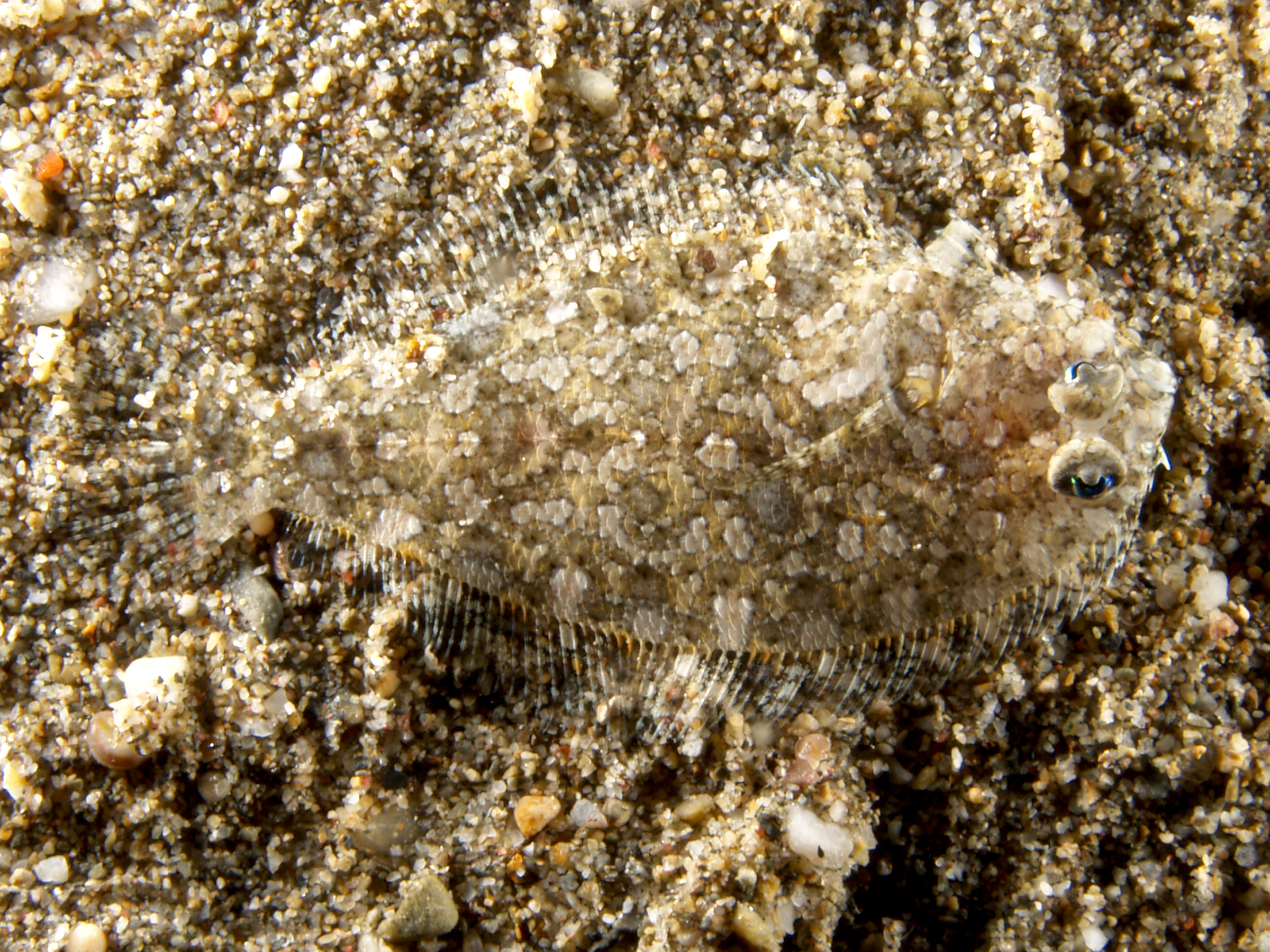
- Intermediate Flounder (A. intermedius)

Scientific classification
- Domain: Eukaryota
- Kingdom: Animalia
- Phylum: Chordata
- Class: Actinopterygii
- Order: Carangiformes
- Suborder: Pleuronectoidei
- Family: Bothidae
- Genus: Asterorhombus; S. Tanaka (I), 1915

Type species
- Asterorhombus stellifer Tanaka 1915

= Asterorhombus =

Genus of fishes

Asterorhombus is a genus of lefteye flounders native to the Indo-Pacific. These small flatfishes only reach 20 cm (7.9 in) in length.

== Species ==
There are currently three recognized species in this genus:

- Asterorhombus cocosensis (Bleeker, 1855) (Cocos Island flounder)
- Asterorhombus filifer Hensley & J. E. Randall, 2003
- Asterorhombus intermedius (Bleeker, 1865) (Intermediate flounder)
