= Neolaeops =

Scientific classification
- Kingdom: Animalia
- Phylum: Chordata
- Class: Actinopterygii
- Division: Teleostei
- Order: Carangiformes
- Suborder: Pleuronectoidei
- Family: Bothidae
- Genus: Neolaeops; Amaoka, 1969
- Species: N. microphthalmus

Binomial name
- Neolaeops microphthalmus (von Bonde, 1922)

Synonyms
- Laeops microphthalmus von Bonde 1922

Species of fish

Neolaeops microphthalmus, the crosseyed flounder, is a deep water species of lefteye flounder found in the Indian and Western Pacific Oceans. It occurs at depths of from 275 to 400 metres (902 to 1,312 ft). This species grows to a length of 21 centimetres (8.3 in) SL. This species is the only known member of its genus.
