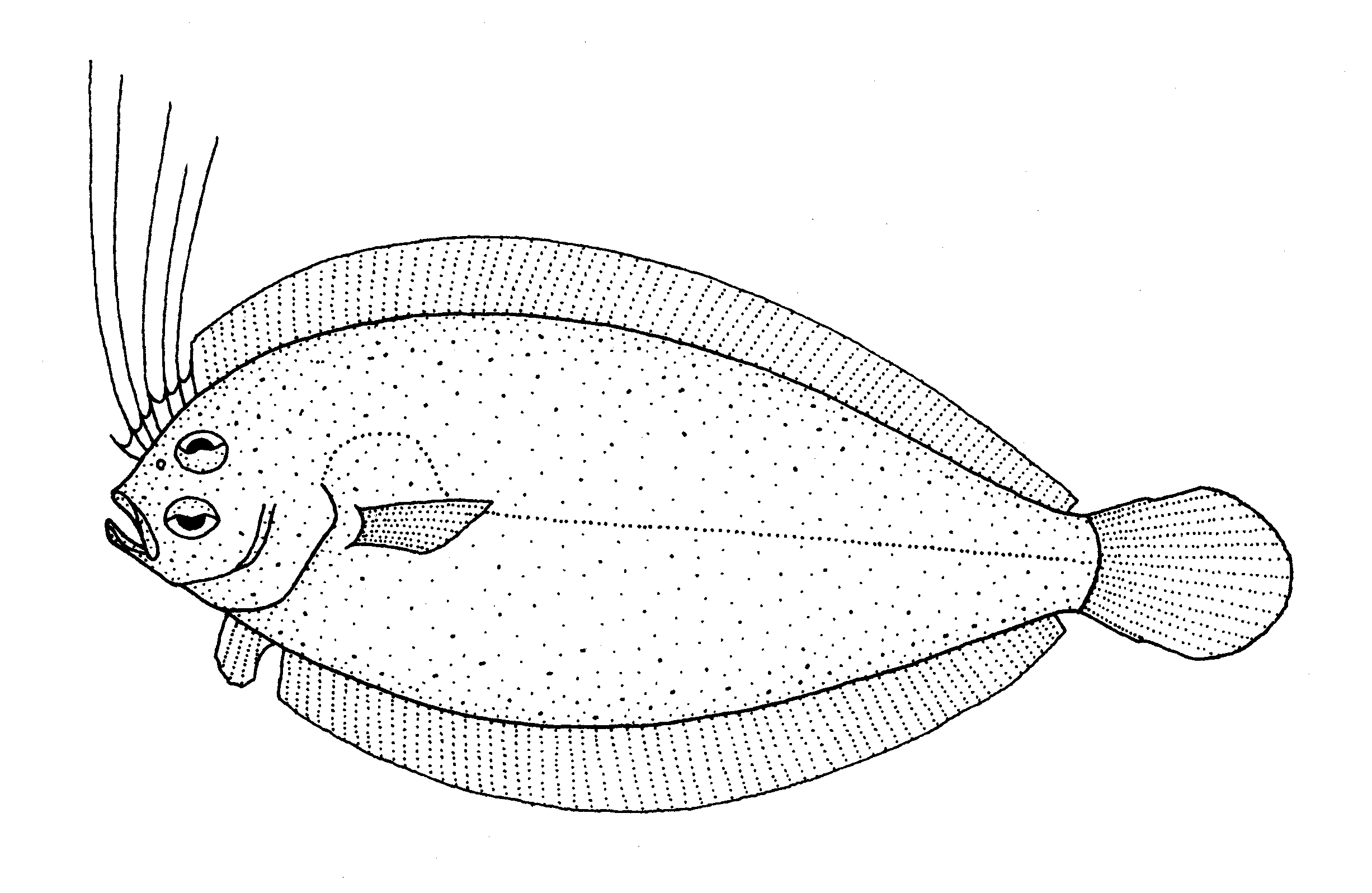
- Crested Flounder (L. gallus)
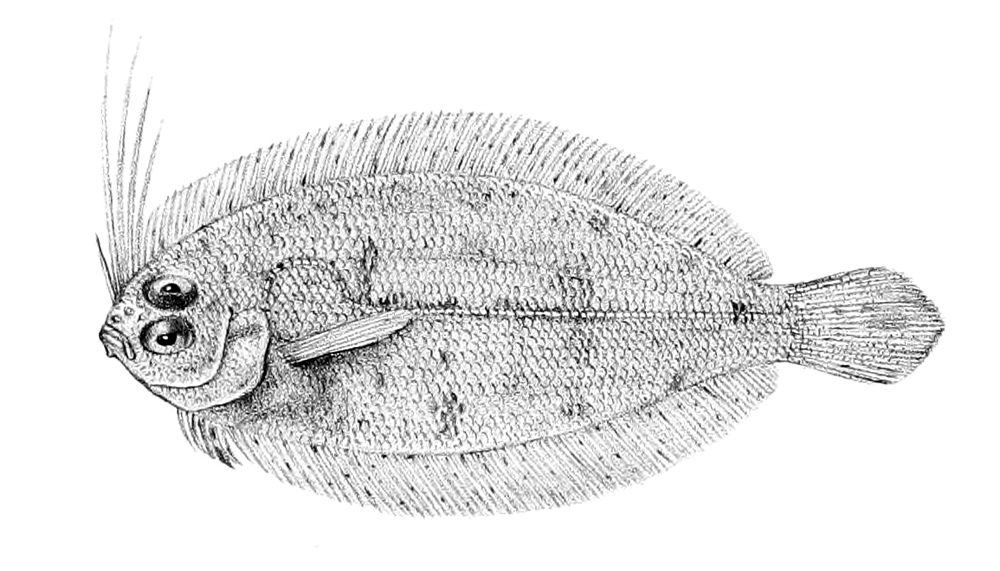
- L. mongonuiensis

Scientific classification
- Domain: Eukaryota
- Kingdom: Animalia
- Phylum: Chordata
- Class: Actinopterygii
- Order: Carangiformes
- Suborder: Pleuronectoidei
- Family: Bothidae
- Genus: Lophonectes; Günther, 1880

Type species
- Lophonectes gallus Günther,1880

Synonyms
- Lophorhombus Macleay, 1882

= Lophonectes =

Genus of fishes

Lophonectes is a genus of small lefteye flounders found in the southwestern Pacific Ocean off Australia and New Zealand.

== Species ==
There are currently two recognized species in this genus:

- Lophonectes gallus Günther, 1880 (Crested flounder)
- Lophonectes mongonuiensis (Regan, 1914)
