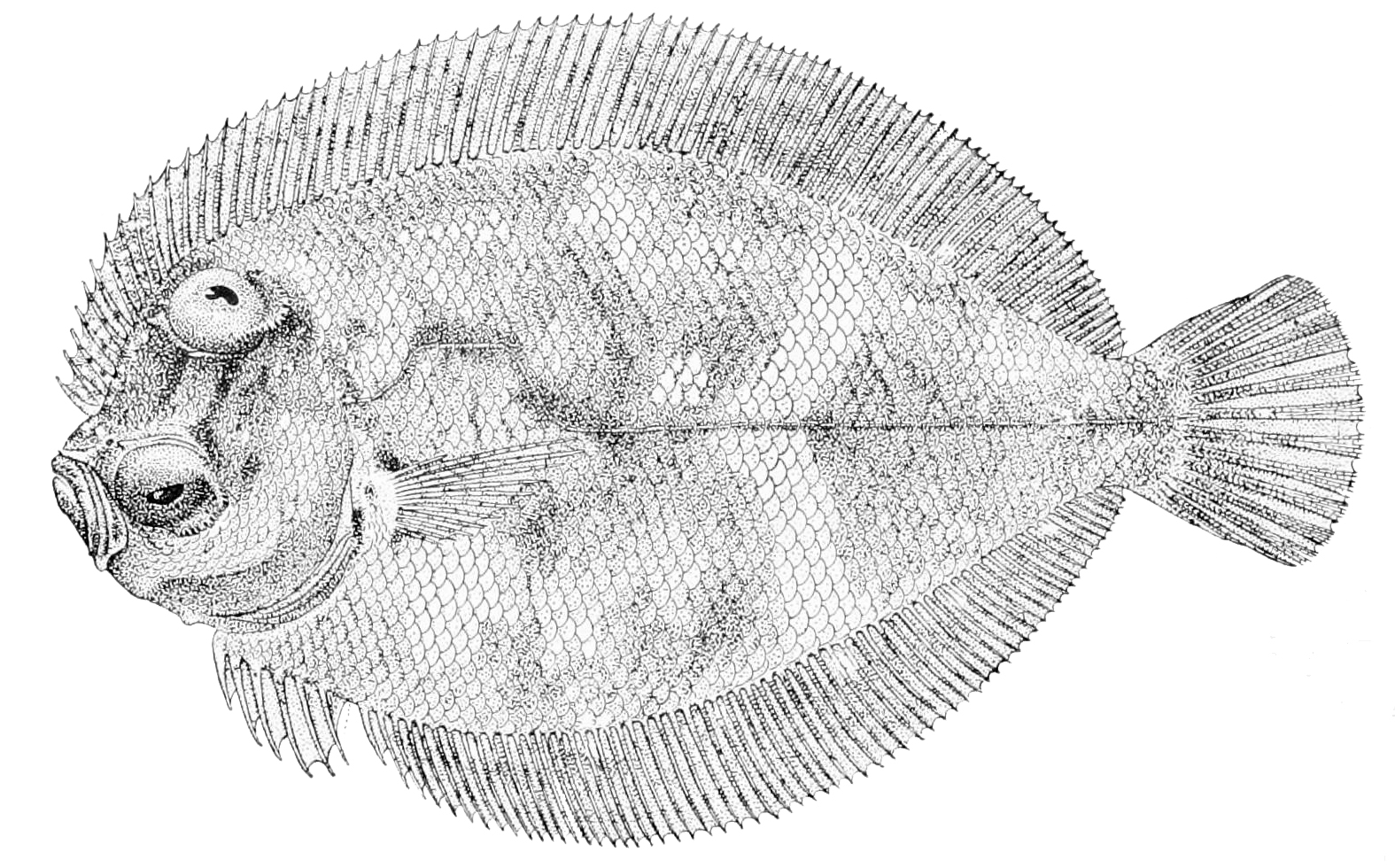
- Engyprosopon xenandrus

Scientific classification
- Kingdom: Animalia
- Phylum: Chordata
- Class: Actinopterygii
- Order: Carangiformes
- Suborder: Pleuronectoidei
- Family: Bothidae
- Genus: Engyprosopon; Günther, 1862

Type species
- Rhombus mogkii Bleeker, 1854

Synonyms
- Scaeops Jordan & Starks, 1904

= Engyprosopon =

Genus of fishes

Engyprosopon is a genus of small lefteye flounders. They are found in the Indo-Pacific, ranging from shallow coastal waters to depths in excess of 400 m (1,300 ft).

== Species ==
There are currently 34 recognized species in this genus:

- Engyprosopon annulatus (M. C. W. Weber, 1913)
- Engyprosopon arenicola D. S. Jordan & Evermann, 1903 (Fringelip dwarf flounder)
- Engyprosopon bellonaense Amaoka, Mihara & Rivaton, 1993 (Bellona flounder)
- Engyprosopon bleekeri (W. J. Macleay, 1881) (Bleeker's flounder)
- Engyprosopon brevifrontale Amaoka & Ho, 2018
- Engyprosopon filipennis H. W. Wu & S. F. Tang, 1935
- Engyprosopon grandisquama (Temminck & Schlegel, 1846) (Largescale flounder)
- Engyprosopon hawaiiense D. S. Jordan & Evermann, 1903
- Engyprosopon hensleyi Amaoka & Imamura, 1990
- Engyprosopon hureaui Quéro & Golani, 1990 (Hureau's flounder)
- Engyprosopon keliaoense Amaoka & Ho, 2022 (Keliao lefteye flounder)
- Engyprosopon kushimotoense Amaoka, Kaga & Misaki, 2008
- Engyprosopon latifrons (Regan, 1908)
- Engyprosopon longipelvis Amaoka, 1969
- Engyprosopon longipterum Amaoka, Mihara & Rivaton, 1993 (Long pectoral fin flounder)
- Engyprosopon macrolepis (Regan, 1908)
- Engyprosopon maldivense (Regan, 1908) (Olive wide-eyed flounder)
- Engyprosopon marquisense Amaoka & Séret, 2005
- Engyprosopon mogkii (Bleeker, 1854)
- Engyprosopon mozambiquense Hensley, 2003
- Engyprosopon multisquama Amaoka, 1963
- Engyprosopon natalense Regan, 1920 (Natal flounder)
- Engyprosopon obliquioculatum (Fowler, 1934)
- Engyprosopon osculus (Amaoka & M. Arai, 1998)
- Engyprosopon parvipectorale Amaoka & Ho, 2018
- Engyprosopon praeteritus Whitley, 1950
- Engyprosopon raoulense Amaoka & Mihara, 1995
- Engyprosopon regani Hensley & Suzumoto, 1990 (Regan's flatfish)
- Engyprosopon rostratum Amaoka, Mihara & Rivaton, 1993 (Long snout flounder)
- Engyprosopon sechellense (Regan, 1908)
- Engyprosopon septempes Amaoka, Mihara & Rivaton, 1993 (Seven pelvic ray flounder)
- Engyprosopon vanuatuense Amaoka & Séret, 2005
- Engyprosopon xenandrus C. H. Gilbert, 1905
- Engyprosopon xystrias C. L. Hubbs, 1915
