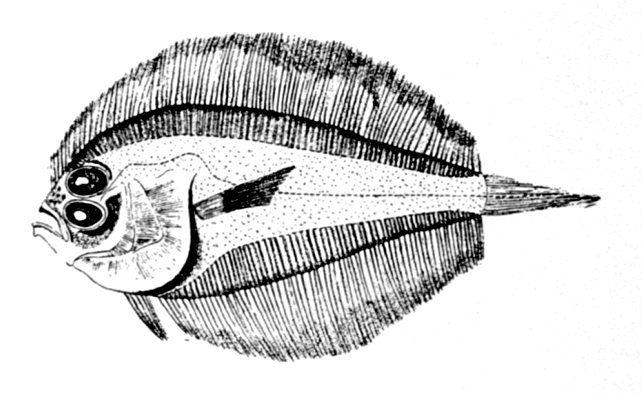
- L. macrophthalmus

Scientific classification
- Domain: Eukaryota
- Kingdom: Animalia
- Phylum: Chordata
- Class: Actinopterygii
- Order: Carangiformes
- Suborder: Pleuronectoidei
- Family: Bothidae
- Genus: Laeops; Günther, 1880

Type species
- Laeops parviceps Günther, 1880

Synonyms
- Laeoptichthys Hubbs, 1915; Lambdopsetta Smith & Pope, 1906; Leptolaeops Fowler, 1934; Scianectes Alcock, 1889

= Laeops =

Genus of fishes

Laeops is a genus of small lefteye flounders from the Indo-Pacific. They are mainly found in deep water, although a few species have been recorded shallower than 100 m (330 ft).

== Species ==
There are currently 13 recognized species in this genus:

- Laeops clarus Fowler, 1934 (Clear fin-base flounder)
- Laeops cypho Fowler, 1934
- Laeops gracilis Fowler, 1934 (Philippine slender flounder)
- Laeops guentheri Alcock, 1890 (Günther's flounder)
- Laeops kitaharae (H. M. Smith & T. E. B. Pope, 1906)
- Laeops macrophthalmus (Alcock, 1889)
- Laeops natalensis Norman, 1931 (Khaki flounder)
- Laeops nigrescens Lloyd, 1907
- Laeops nigromaculatus von Bonde, 1922 (Blackspotted flounder)
- Laeops parviceps Günther, 1880 (Small headed flounder)
- Laeops pectoralis (von Bonde, 1922) (Longarm flounder)
- Laeops sinusarabici Chabanaud, 1968
- Laeops tungkongensis J. S. T. F. Chen & H. T. C. Weng, 1965
