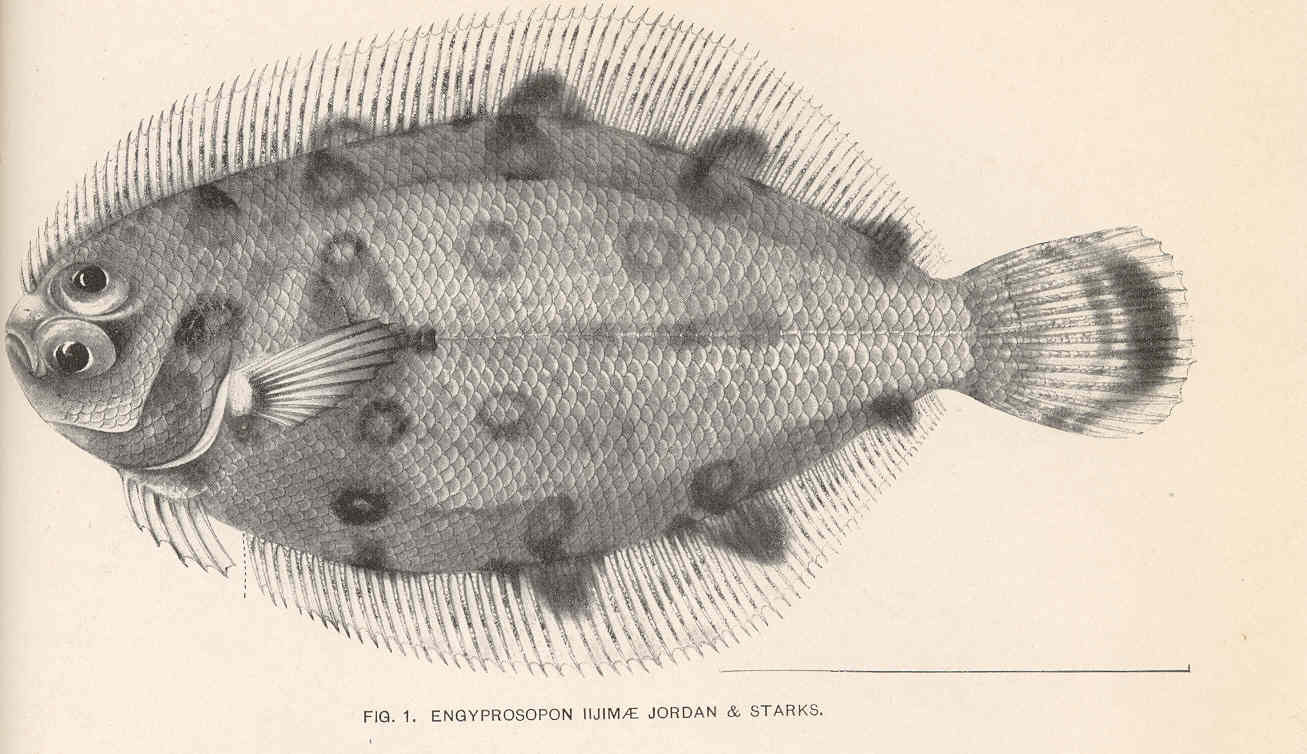
- Psettina iijimae

Scientific classification
- Kingdom: Animalia
- Phylum: Chordata
- Class: Actinopterygii
- Order: Carangiformes
- Suborder: Pleuronectoidei
- Family: Bothidae
- Genus: Psettina; C. L. Hubbs, 1915

Type species
- Engyprosopon iijimae Jordan & Starks 1904

Synonyms
- Crossobothus Fowler, 1934; Crossolepis Norman, 1927; Psettinella Fedorov & Foroshchuk, 1988

= Psettina =

Genus of fishes

Psettina is a genus of small lefteye flounders native to the Indo-Pacific.

== Species ==
There are currently 10 recognized species in this genus:

- Psettina brevirictis (Alcock, 1890)
- Psettina filimana S. Z. Li & H. M. Wang, 1982
- Psettina gigantea Amaoka, 1963 (Rough-scaled flounder)
- Psettina hainanensis (H. W. Wu & S. F. Tang, 1935)
- Psettina iijimae (D. S. Jordan & Starks, 1904)
- Psettina multisquamea Fedorov & Foroshchuk, 1988
- Psettina profunda (M. C. W. Weber, 1913)
- Psettina senta Amaoka & Larson, 1999
- Psettina tosana Amaoka, 1963
- Psettina variegata (Fowler, 1934)
