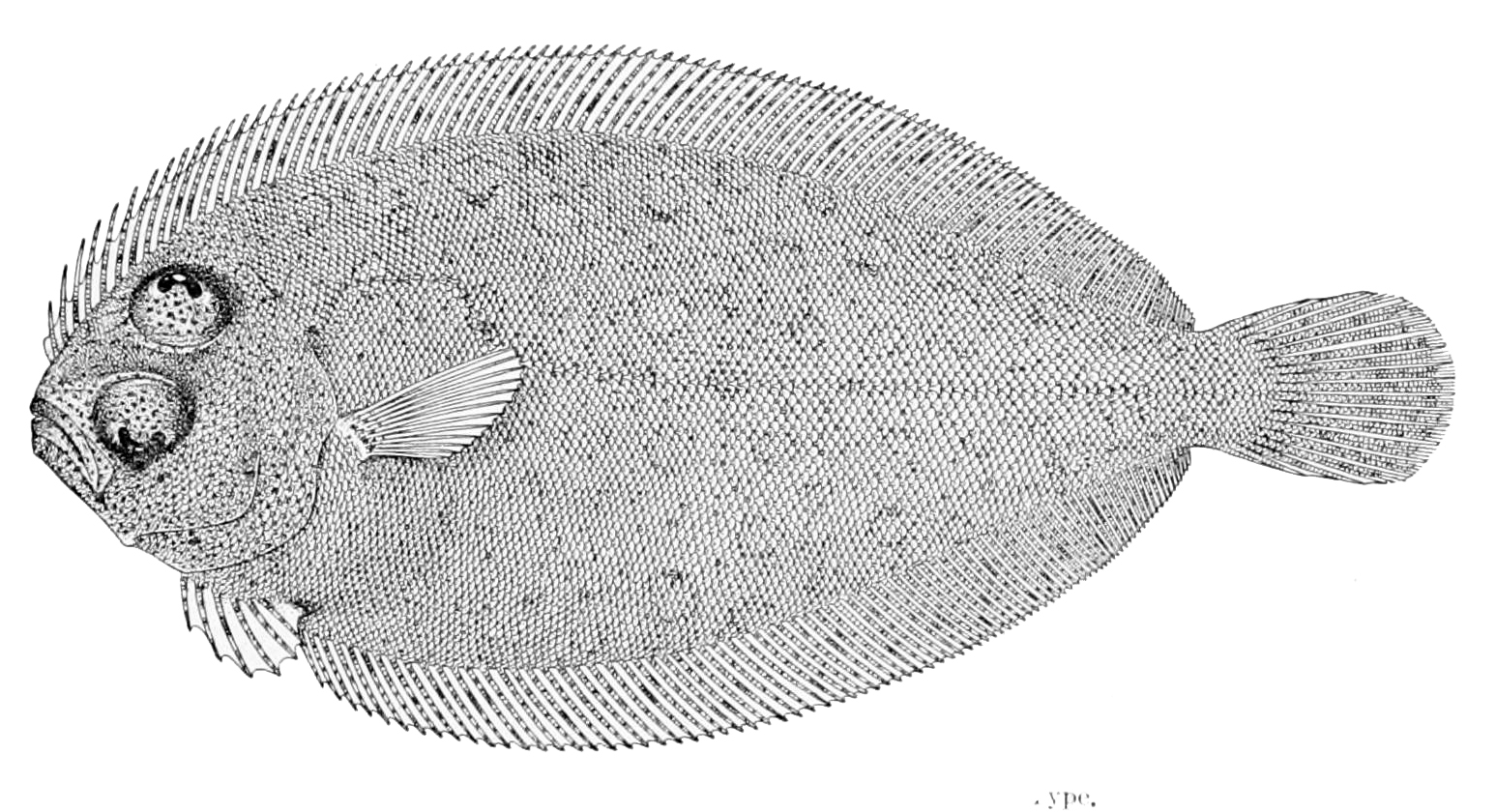
- Parabothus chlorospilus

Scientific classification
- Kingdom: Animalia
- Phylum: Chordata
- Class: Actinopterygii
- Order: Carangiformes
- Suborder: Pleuronectoidei
- Family: Bothidae
- Genus: Parabothus; Norman, 1931

Type species
- Arnoglossus polylepis Alcock 1889

= Parabothus =

Genus of fishes

Parabothus is a genus of fish in the family Bothidae native to the Indian and Pacific Ocean.

== Species ==
There are currently 10 recognized species in this genus:

- Parabothus amaokai Parin, 1983
- Parabothus budkeri (Chabanaud, 1943)
- Parabothus chlorospilus (C. H. Gilbert, 1905)
- Parabothus coarctatus (C. H. Gilbert, 1905)
- Parabothus filipes Amaoka, Mihara & Rivaton, 1997
- Parabothus kiensis (S. Tanaka (I), 1918)
- Parabothus malhensis (Regan, 1908)
- Parabothus polylepis (Alcock, 1889) (Many-scaled flounder)
- Parabothus rotundifrons Voronina, Pruvost & Causse, 2017
- Parabothus taiwanensis Amaoka & S. C. Shen, 1993
