= Grammatobothus =

Scientific classification
- Kingdom: Animalia
- Phylum: Chordata
- Class: Actinopterygii
- Order: Carangiformes
- Suborder: Pleuronectoidei
- Family: Grammatobothidae; Tongboonkua, Chanet & Chen, 2025
- Genus: Grammatobothus; Norman, 1926

Type species
- Platophrys (Platophrys) polyophthalmus Bleeker, 1866

Genus of fishes

Grammatobothus is a genus of small flatfish native to the Indo-Pacific.

Their eyes are located on the left side of their body, and thus they have long been placed in the "lefteye flounder" family, Bothidae. However, more recent studies have split up the family into multiple families, with Grammatobothus being the most basal member of this group. For this reason, it was moved to its own monotypic family, Grammatobothidae (the small lefteye flounders), in 2025.

== Species ==
There are currently three recognized species in this genus:

- Grammatobothus krempfi Chabanaud, 1929 (Krempf's flounder)
- Grammatobothus pennatus (J. D. Ogilby, 1913) (Pennant flounder)
- Grammatobothus polyophthalmus (Bleeker, 1865) (Threespot flounder)
