= Japonolaeops =

Scientific classification
- Kingdom: Animalia
- Phylum: Chordata
- Class: Actinopterygii
- Division: Teleostei
- Order: Carangiformes
- Suborder: Pleuronectoidei
- Family: Bothidae
- Genus: Japonolaeops; Amaoka, 1969
- Species: J. dentatus

Binomial name
- Japonolaeops dentatus Amaoka, 1969

Species of fish

Japonolaeops dentatus is a species of lefteye flounder found in the western Pacific Ocean from southern Japan to Taiwan. This is a deep water species found at depths of from 300 to 500 metres (980 to 1,640 ft). This species grows to a length of 20 centimetres (7.9 in) SL. This species is important commercially. This species is the only known member of its genus.
