= Engyophrys =

Scientific classification
- Domain: Eukaryota
- Kingdom: Animalia
- Phylum: Chordata
- Class: Actinopterygii
- Order: Carangiformes
- Suborder: Pleuronectoidei
- Family: Bothidae
- Genus: Engyophrys; D. S. Jordan & Bollman, 1890

Type species
- Engyophrys sanctilaurentii Jordan & Bollman 1890

Genus of fishes

Engyophrys is a genus of small lefteye flounders native to the oceans around the Americas.

== Species ==
There are currently two recognized species in this genus:

- Engyophrys sanctilaurentii D. S. Jordan & Bollman, 1890 (Speckled-tail flounder)
- Engyophrys senta Ginsburg, 1933 (American spiny flounder)
