= Yuriko Kuronuma =

Japanese violinist (born 1940)

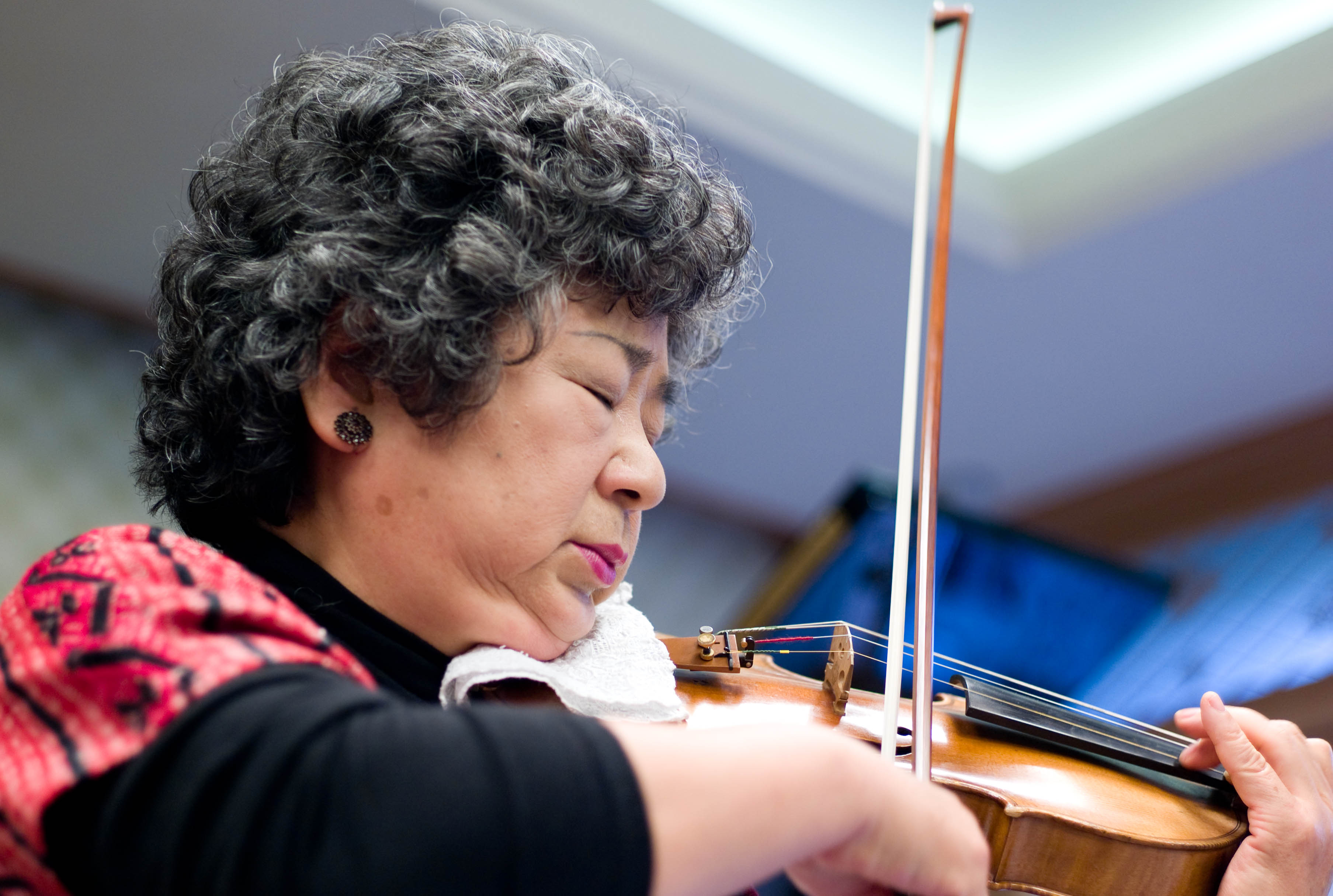
Yuriko Kuronuma.

Yuriko Kuronuma (黒沼 ユリ子, Kuronuma Yuriko) (born 4 June 1940, in Tokyo) is a Japanese violinist.

Starting the violin at age 8, she won in 1956 the first prize and special award in The Music Competition of Japan, one of the most prestigious music contests in Japan. After that, she studied in the Musical Arts Academy of Prague in Czech Republic.
