= Katsuzo Kuronuma =

Katsuzo Kuronuma (黒沼勝造, Kuronuma Katsuzō) (1908–1992) was a Japanese ichthyologist. His published works include:

- Rearing of Marine Fish Larvae in Japan
- Fishes of the Arabian Gulf (referring to the Persian Gulf)
- Fishes of Kuwait
