= Harry Macdonald Kyle =

Henry Macdonald Kyle (1872–1951) was a Scottish ichthyologist and fisheries scientist.

Kyle graduated from St Andrews University where he was a protégé of William Carmichael McIntosh. In 1903 he was appointed as Biological Secretary to the International Council for the Exploration of the Sea (ICES), based in Copenhagen. He was an expert on flatfish, especially plaice, and worked with Walter Garstang at Plymouth. Later he collaborated extensively with Ernst Ehrenbaum of the Museum of Natural History in Hamburg. He made important contributions to fisheries science and produced definitive works which were among the first scientific studies to address the issue of overfishing.

It is known that in the late 1920s and early 1930s he became alienated from his wife and children, referring to himself in letters as an outcast. He was, however, reconciled to at least one of his sisters later in life. His later life is almost unknown except that he died in 1951 in Scotland.

He was an accomplished linguist who translated the works of many Danish and German fisheries scientists and ichthyologists into English. His magnum opus was a book on the fisheries of Great Britain and Ireland which was published in German. An earlier book, "The biology of fishes", was published in English, but it was dedicated to Ehrenbaum. Kyle appeared to find living in Germany more conducive to his work and he was often assumed to have been a German rather than a Scot.

Kyle was one of the founders of the study of the bioeconomics of fishing and his argument that fish stocks were outside the scope of normal economics because economics are not subject to "natural law" was pioneering and remains generally accepted.

== Publications ==
A selection of some of the published works by Kyle is set out below:

- On the Presence of Nasal Secretory Sacs and a Nasopharyngeal communication in Teleostei with an especial reference to Cynoglossus semilaevis Gthr. J Linn Soc Zool 27:541–. 556, 1900
- Bulletin statistique des pêches maritimes des pays du nord et de l'ouest de l'Europe International Council for the Exploration of the Sea Copenhagen 1906
- Flat-fishes (Heterosomata) Rep. Danish Oceanogr. Exped. 1908-10 2(A1 ): 150 pp, 4 plates. 1908
- The biology of fishes 1926
- Die Seefischerei von Grossbritannien und Irland 1929
- Die Statistik der Seefischerei Nord-Europas nebst Anhang: Die Überfischungsfrage 1928
