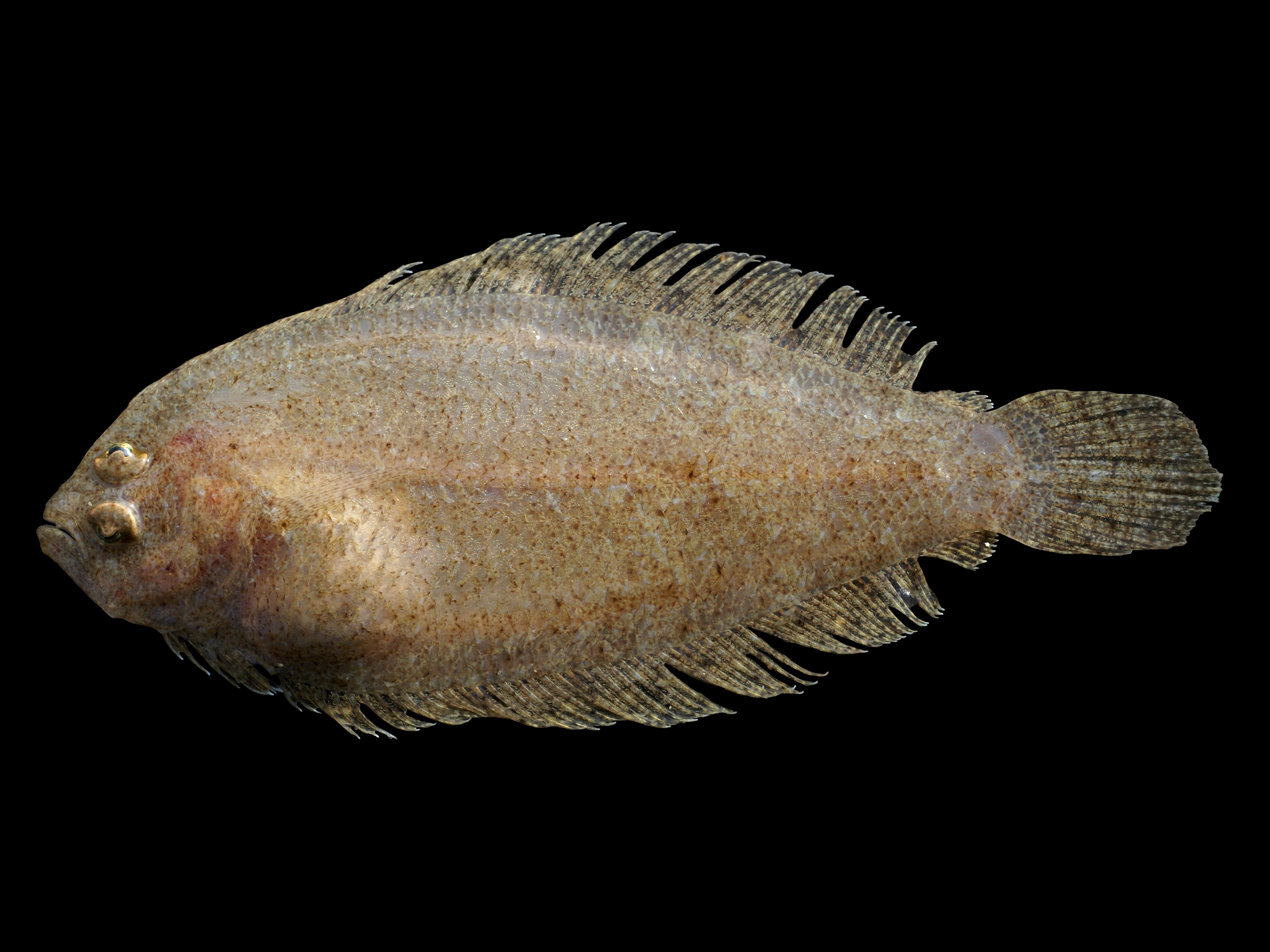
- Scaldfish, Arnoglossus laterna

Scientific classification
- Kingdom: Animalia
- Phylum: Chordata
- Class: Actinopterygii
- Order: Carangiformes
- Suborder: Pleuronectoidei
- Family: Bothidae; Smitt, 1892

Type genus
- Bothus Rafinesque, 1810

Genera
- See text

= Bothidae =

Lefteye flounders Temporal range: Early Oligocene–present

Family of fishes

Bothidae or lefteye flounders are a family of flounders. They are called "lefteye flounders" because most species lie on the sea bottom on their right sides, with both eyes on their left sides. The family is also distinguished by the presence of spines on the snout and near the eyes.

Lefteye flounders vary considerably in size between the more than 160 species, ranging from 4.5 cm (1.8 in) to 1.5 m (4.9 ft) in length.

== Taxonomy ==
The following genera are placed in this family:

- Arnoglossus
- Asterorhombus
- Bothus
- Chascanopsetta
- Crossorhombus
- Engyprosopon
- Japonolaeops
- Kamoharaia
- Laeops
- Lophonectes
- Neolaeops
- Parabothus
- Psettina
- Tosarhombus

The following fossil genera are also known:

- †Miobothus Chanet & Schultz, 1994 (Middle Miocene of Austria)
- †Oligobothus Baciu & Chanet, 2002 (Early Oligocene of Romania and Poland)
- †Oranobothus Chanet, 1996 (latest Miocene of Algeria)

In 2025, a number of bothid genera were moved to their own families Monolenidae, Grammatobothidae, and Taeniopsettidae, after phylogenetic analyses noted the taxonomic complexity of this family. Many other genera within this family are likely paraphyletic.

== Gallery ==
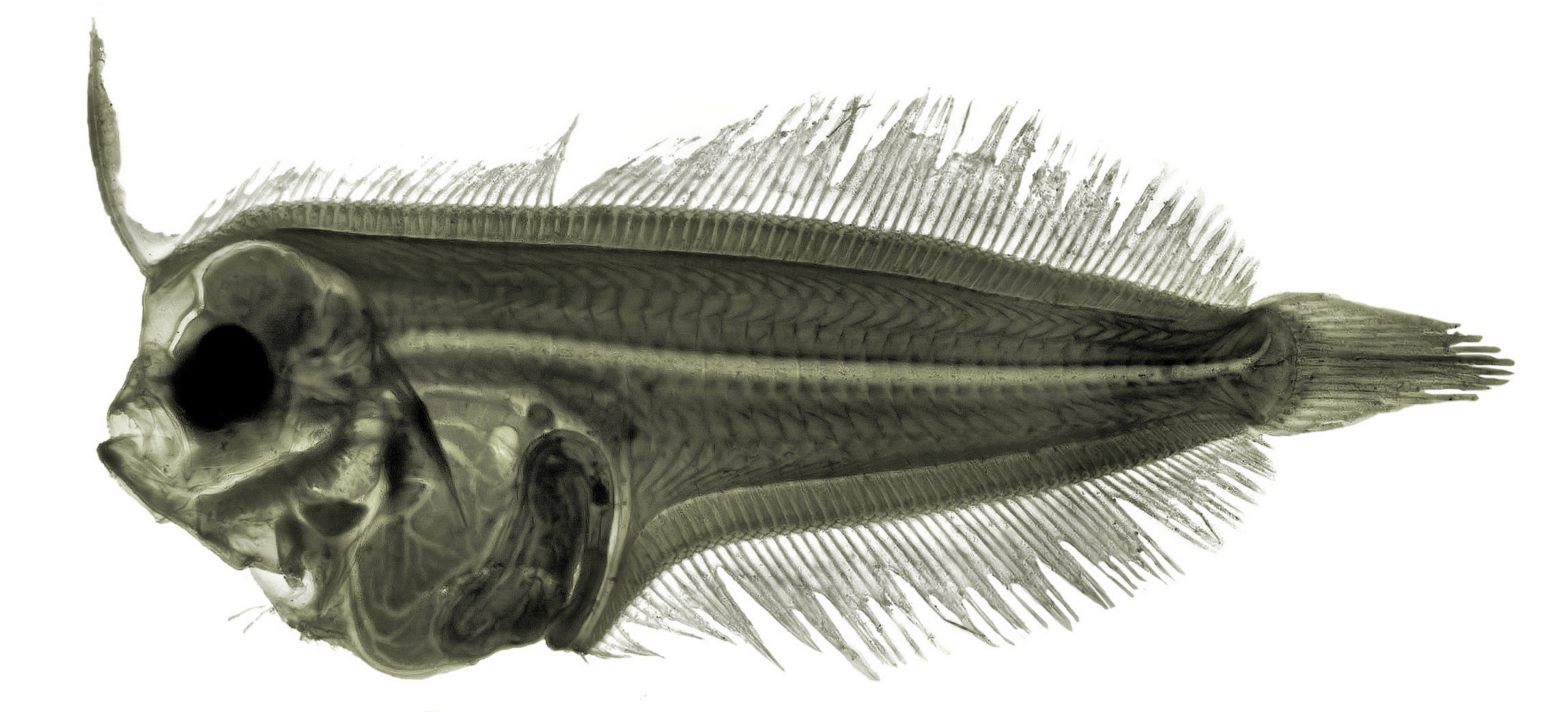
Scaldfish (Arnoglossus laterna) larva

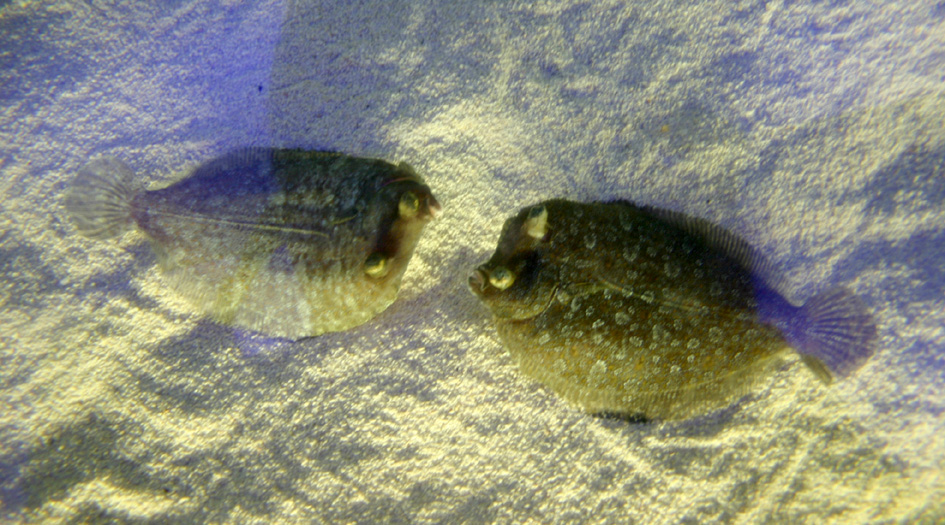
Wide-eyed flounder, Bothus podas

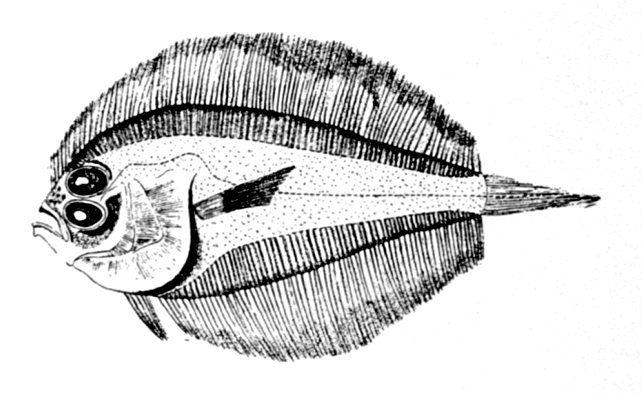
Laeops macrophthalmus

== See also ==
- Pleuronectidae, the righteye family of flounders
