= Samari =

Samari may refer to:

== Places ==
- Samari, Nepal
- Samari, a neighborhood of Cap-Haïtien, Haiti, site of the 2021 Cap-Haïtien fuel tanker explosion

== People ==
- Samari Rolle (born 1976), American football player
- Ali Samari (born 1993), Iranian shot putter
- Bader Al Samari (born 1974), Saudi screenwriter and novelist

== See also ==
- Samaris (disambiguation)
- Samurai (disambiguation)
