= Dynasty (disambiguation) =

A dynasty is a series of rulers from one family.

Dynasty may also refer to:

== Arts and media ==
=== Film and television ===
- Dynasty (film), a 1976 NBC television film
- Dynasty (Australian TV series), a 1970 Australian TV series
- Dynasty (1981 TV series), a 1980s American primetime television soap opera
- Dynasty (2017 TV series), a reboot of the 1980s series
- Dynasties (2002 TV series), a 2002 Australian television documentary series
- Dynasties (2018 TV series), a 2018 BBC nature television documentary series
- The Affaire in the Swing Age, a 2003 Chinese TV series released in some regions as The Dynasty
- Dynasty Barry, fictional character in UK TV series Waterloo Road
- The Dynasty (2025 film), a 2025 Hungarian documentary film

=== Music ===
- Dynasty (association), a Finnish music association and record label
- Dynasty (band), a 1978–1989 American funk/soul R&B band
- Dynasty (hardcore band), an American Christian hardcore punk band formed in 2004
- Dynasty Tour, a 1979 concert tour by Kiss

==== Albums ====
- Dynasty (As They Sleep album), 2010
- Dynasty (Kaskade album) or the title song (see below), 2010
- Dynasty (Kiss album), 1979
- Dynasty (Stan Getz album) or the title song, 1971
- Dynasty (Two Steps from Hell album), 2007
- The Dynasty: Roc La Familia, by Jay-Z, 2000
- Dynasty (Yandel and Tainy album), 2021

==== Songs ====
- "Dynasty" (song), by Kaskade, 2010
- "Dynasty", by Elephante, 2016
- "Dynasty", by Rina Sawayama from Sawayama, 2020

=== Other media ===
- Dynasty (video game), a 1978 text-based strategy game for the Apple II computer
- Dynasty!, a 1979 video game identical to the game Reversi

== Technology ==
- Dodge Dynasty, a mid-size sedan car
- Dynasty, a brand later owned by Maytag
- Dynasty IT, a neighborhood electric vehicle
- Hyundai Dynasty, a car built by Hyundai Motor Company

== Sports ==
- Dynasty (horse), an Olympic medal-winning horse for Canada
- Dynasty (sports), a team that enjoys a period of dominance over the sport
- The Dynasty (professional wrestling), a professional wrestling stable
- Seoul Dynasty, a Korean esports team in the Overwatch League
- AEW Dynasty, an annual professional wrestling pay-per-view (PPV) event produced by All Elite Wrestling (AEW)

== Other uses ==
- Dynasty Foundation, a Russian private foundation for non-profit education and science development programs
- Dynasty, the callsign of China Airlines

== See also ==
- Die-Nasty, a TV soap opera
- The Dynasts, the only play by Thomas Hardy
- Dynazty, a Swedish heavy metal band
