= Nyírmártonfalva canopy walkway =

Canopy walkway without a canopy in Hungary

- Canopy walkway with trees cut down in March 2023
- Coordinates: 47.577°N 21.918°E

Characteristics
- Design: Canopy walkway
- Total length: 80 m (87 yd)

Location
- Interactive map of Nyírmártonfalva canopy walkway

A canopy walkway in Nyírmártonfalva, Hungary, sparked a scandal in March 2023 when Átlátszó.hu reported that the forest surrounding the walkway – financed by EU funds – had been cut down. The mayor responsible for the walkway has been indicted and pled not guilty.

== Financing and building ==
Nyírmártonfalva, with a population of 2,000, is located in Hajdú–Bihar County, near Debrecen. Under the Hungarian rural development program, entrepreneur Mihály Filemon applied for an EU grant in 2018. He applied to build a forest recreation area with an 80 m (87 yd) long canopy walkway on his own land. He was awarded a grant of 64 million forints (€161,000) of EU funds. He was elected mayor of the village with the help of Prime Minister Viktor Orbán's Fidesz party. He began construction of the canopy walkway. The project was financed 80% through EU funds; each metre of the walkway cost 644,347 forints (€1682) of EU funds.

Due to inflation increasing prices, Filemon cut the surrounding forest down to sell the trees around the summer of 2022. Saplings were replanted in 2023. Due to the lack of competition and Filemon not disclosing material facts regarding the implementation, the supervisory authority denied payment, citing the rule violations. (Note: As the payment was denied, Filemon was only charged with attempted fraud.)

== Scandal ==
In late March 2023, investigative online newspaper Átlátszó.hu published a video report that the forest surrounding the walkway had been cut down. Mayor Mihály Filemon said "Anyone who knows the basics of forestry shouldn't be surprised to see a canopy walkway in a felled forest." Filemon said that he submitted the paperwork for the walkway in 2017 – when the forest was still there – but it was only accepted in 2021, when the forest reached its end of life. He added that he planned to replant the trees. Filemon also stated that the grant did not require a canopy around the walkway. He said he would sue all outlets which reported on the case, saying that he was discredited and deeply offended. He sued Átlátszó.hu, did not show up at court, and lost the case.

Tourists, journalists, opposition politicians, and US Ambassador David Pressman came to visit the walkway.

Transparency International Hungary requested the newly-established Integrity Authority (IH) to investigate the case, citing "systemic errors" in the selection of Hungarian EU-funded projects. IH has filed a criminal complaint, but the agency does not have authority to impose sanctions on its own. In September 2023, the European Anti-Fraud Office (OLAF) opened an investigation into the case, in response to the report of MPs Anna Donáth (Momentum) and Ákos Hadházy (independent).

According to the news agency Agence France-Presse, the corruption-accused program "showcases the deep-seated problem of graft and waste" in Hungary.

== Criminal case ==
In January 2026, the National Tax and Customs Office interrogated Filemon as a suspect. In March, Filemon was indicted for attempted budget fraud causing particularly significant financial loss and the use of forged private documents. The prosecution alleged that Filemon's goal was to unlawfully obtain the full amount of the grant, that he had no actual intention of carrying out the project, and that he falsely stated the facility was fulfilling its intended function. They accused another defendant of aiding Filemon. Both pleaded not guilty. Prosecutors seek a prison sentence of 1 year and 6 months, suspended for a 4-year probationary period for both defendants, a fine of 2.1 million forints (€ 5,700) for Filemon, and 750 thousand forints (€2000) for the other defendant. In court, Filemon reiterated his view, that a forest is still a forest even if the trees have been cut down.

== See also ==
- Corruption in Hungary
- Criticism of Fidesz
- The Dynasty
