= Samariscus triocellatus =

Scientific classification
- Domain: Eukaryota
- Kingdom: Animalia
- Phylum: Chordata
- Class: Actinopterygii
- Order: Carangiformes
- Suborder: Pleuronectoidei
- Family: Samaridae
- Genus: Samariscus
- Species: S. triocellatus

Binomial name
- Samariscus triocellatus Woods, 1960

Species of fish

Samariscus triocellatus is a species of flatfish in the family Samaridae.
