= Samaris (disambiguation) =

Samaris is a genus of crested flounders native to the Indo-Pacific.

Samaris may also refer to:

- Samariscus, a genus of crested flounders native to the Indo-Pacific
- Samaris (band), an Icelandic electronic music band
- Andreas Samaris (born 1989), Greek footballer
- Samaris, a fictional city in François Schuiten and Benoît Peeters' Samaris
