= Samaretta perexilis =

Conservation status
- Data Deficient (IUCN 3.1)

Scientific classification
- Kingdom: Animalia
- Phylum: Chordata
- Class: Actinopterygii
- Order: Carangiformes
- Suborder: Pleuronectoidei
- Family: Samaridae
- Genus: Samaretta; Voronina & Suzumoto, 2017
- Species: S. perexilis

Binomial name
- Samaretta perexilis Voronina & Suzumoto, 2017

Species of fish

Samaretta perexilis is a species of fish in the family Samaridae found from deep-waters from submarine mountains of the southern eastern Pacific. This species is the only member of its genus.
