= Nyírmártonfalva =

Coordinates: 47°35′N 21°54′E

- Interactive map of Nyírmártonfalva
- Country: Hungary
- County: Hajdú-Bihar

Area
  - Total: 57.48 km^{2} (22.19 sq mi)

Population (2015)
  - Total: 2,034
  - Density: 35.4/km^{2} (92/sq mi)
- Time zone: UTC+1 (CET)
  - Summer (DST): UTC+2 (CEST)
- Postal code: 4263
- Area code: 52

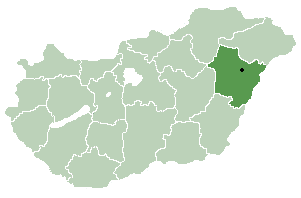
Location of Hajdú-Bihar county in Hungary

Nyírmártonfalva is a village in Hajdú-Bihar county, in the Northern Great Plain region of eastern Hungary.

== Geography ==
It covers an area of 57.48 km^{2} (22 sq mi) and has a population of 2034 people (2015). The canopy walkway without a canopy was built here.
