= Plagiopsetta =

Scientific classification
- Domain: Eukaryota
- Kingdom: Animalia
- Phylum: Chordata
- Class: Actinopterygii
- Order: Carangiformes
- Suborder: Pleuronectoidei
- Family: Samaridae
- Genus: Plagiopsetta; V. Franz, 1910

Type species
- Plagiopsetta glossa Franz, 1910

Genus of fishes

Plagiopsetta is a genus of crested flounders native to the western Pacific Ocean.

== Species ==
There are currently three recognized species in this genus:

- Plagiopsetta glossa V. Franz, 1910 (Tongue flatfish)
- Plagiopsetta gracilis Mihara & Amaoka, 2004
- Plagiopsetta stigmosa Mihara & Amaoka, 2004
