= Criticism of Fidesz =

Criticism of Hungarian conservative party

The Hungarian conservative party Fidesz has been accused of exhibiting anti-democratic and authoritarian tendencies since their return to leading the Hungarian government in 2010 under the leadership of Viktor Orbán in his second premiership, which governed Hungary until Fidesz's defeat in the 2026 Hungarian parliamentary election. The Fidesz-led government was accused of severely restricting media freedom, undermining the independence of the courts, subjugating and politicising independent and non-governmental institutions, surveilling political opponents, engaging in electoral engineering, and assailing critical NGOs. The Fidesz-led government was accused of engaging in cronyism and corruption. Fidesz has been accused of antisemitism, and the Fidesz-led government was accused of passing legislation that violates the rights of LGBT persons. Due to its controversial actions, Fidesz and its government have come in conflict with the EU on multiple occasions.

== Authoritarian and anti-democratic actions ==
The Fidesz government has been accused of "[chipping] away at the country's democratic framework, reducing judicial independence, taking control of most state and private media and reshaping the electoral system to favor ... Fidesz." It has also been accused of providing a "blueprint for the erosion of democratic institutions" in countries like Poland, and an inspiration for far-right politicians in Italy, France, the Netherlands, and Brazil, while leaving analysts struggling to determine whether Hungary is still a democracy. Bertelsmann Stiftung, a German research organisation, has assessed that Hungary under a Fidesz-dominated government is approaching autocracy. Fidesz's governance has been described by some as reminiscent of Communist-led Hungary of the Kádár-era. Members of Fidesz have argued that the party is simply pursuing an alternative model of democracy, different from the common example of liberal democracy.

=== Press freedom ===
The Fidesz government has been accused of "silencing media", and of controlling all major media outlets in Hungary, thus creating an echo chamber that has excluded alternative political voices. The government has been accused of selectively starving non-loyal media organisations of government advertising revenues (the government is the country's second largest advertiser) while pressuring owners of media companies by targeting their other business interests so that they would either fall in line or sell their media holdings. Over 500 Hungarian news outlets were said to be supportive of the government in their coverage as of 2018, up from only 31 in 2015. By 2017, 90% of all Hungarian media was owned by either the state or by Fidesz allies, according to one Hungarian scholar. All regional newspapers are said to be controlled by pro-Fidesz owners.

Orbán attributed Fidesz's 2002 electoral loss to the country's "liberal media", initiating a campaign to recruit loyalists who would buy up media outlets and create a more friendly media environment while engaging operatives to coordinate and administer the media under the government's sway. Media organisations owned by Fidesz-friendly oligarchs are said to coordinate daily press coverage, following "preset news themes".

==== Legislation regarding media regulator appointments and coverage rules for journalists ====
Shortly after taking power in 2010, Orbán passed laws enabling him to appoint candidates to lead the country's main media regulators while expanding the powers of the same regulators to fine and punish media organisations. The law would also impose hefty fines for coverage it finds "unbalanced or offensive to human dignity or common morals". The law was strongly condemned by the European community. Journalists working for public media organisations are furthermore required by law to "promote a national identity" in their reporting.

==== State media ====
State media is said to be "entirely loyal to" Orbán and his government. Soon after taking office, the Fidesz government dispatched new managers to the offices of the Hungarian public radio that were later described as "propagandists" by one employee (a popular radio host). A third of the staff at public broadcasters was also purged. Journalists at the public broadcasters were directed to report on political issues so as to be favourable to the government and its message, faced political interference while reporting on certain topics (e.g. LGBT issues, climate change, and migration), needed to obtain permission from superiors before beginning to write or publishing reports on certain "sensitive" topics that were listed on an internal "watch list", and were prohibited from reporting certain topics. State media has been accused of refusing to cover anti-government protests.

==== Klubrádió ====
The independent opposition-aligned radio station Klubrádió was gradually stripped of radio frequencies until it was only able to broadcast from Budapest, and was to be taken off air by Hungary's media council in 2011. After a campaign by listeners, Klubrádió was awarded a long-term frequency in March 2013. In February 2021, Klubrádió was finally stripped of its license by the media council (which is staffed by government supporters) after failing to file required paperwork in time. Other broadcasters had committed similar mistakes without suffering such a fate. Its appeal to restore its frequency was rejected by the media council in March 2021, saying the filing contained errors and did not meet legal requirements. The European Commission said it was considering legal action against Hungary for its failure to renew the radio station's license.

==== Népszabadság ====
The largest-circulation daily newspaper, Népszabadság, was shut down shortly after publishing a story about a profligate luxury helicopter trip of close Fidesz ally and media operative Antal Rogán and his family. In 2018, immediately following a landslide Fidesz electoral victory, Magyar Nemzet, one of the two national daily newspapers opposed to the government (which had been in print for 80 years) and its sister radio station (both owned by Lajos Simicska, a businessman who entered into confrontation with Orbán in 2015 after a longstanding alliance between the two) announced their intention to cease operations due in part to a government advertising boycott. Hír TV, another media holding of Simicska's media empire, was converted into a pro-government outlet.

==== Origo ====
The transformation of Origo, Hungary's leading news website, from an opposition publication to a government-friendly one has been regarded as an exemplary "cautionary tale" for the stifling of press independence. The site was established in the late 1990s by Magyar Telekom and gradually evolved its investigative journalistic brand. In 2013, Origo was Hungary's most-read news website known for its investigative journalism. Magyar Telekom was acquired by the German Deutsche Telekom (DT) in 2005. In 2010, DT encountered a hostile business environment fostered by the new Fidesz government which adopted punitive measures against foreign owners of domestic companies. During DT's negotiations with the Hungarian government over telecommunications policy, a senior Fidesz official (János Lázár) suggested a covert line of communication between the government and Origo editors because "Origo's journalists had historically struggled to grasp the government's perspective on certain matters". Origo signed a contract with a media consultancy firm run by Attila Várhegyi, a former senior Fidesz member, after which the telecommunications deal was finalized on terms favourable to DT. This resulted in a revolt of Origo employees and editors. During the first half of 2014, political interference in journalists' work and editorial policy began to become noticeable, according to one former employee. After one Origo journalist launched an investigation of Lázár's foreign travel expenses despite Várhegyi's firm's requests to slow the investigation, Lázár complained to Magyar Telekom executives in 2014. Origo, headed by a combative editor-in-chief (Gergő Sáling) protecting a tenacious investigative reporter, persisted in scrutinising Lázár's record and eventually launched court proceedings to obtain documents regarding Lázár while also publishing several pieces unfavourable to Lázár. After Orbán re-election and months of pressure, Magyar Telekom gave in and fired the editor shielding the investigations. Several journalists resigned in protest. Regarding it as a political liability, Magyar Telekom decided to sell Origo. In an open sale process, businesspeople close to the ruling party purchased the news outlet. By 2018, Origo's coverage took a steadfastly pro-government stance.

==== Central European Press and Media Foundation ====
In late 2018, over 400 news media outlets – most of the private media in the country – were consolidated into a central holding company, the Central European Press and Media Foundation, administered by people close to the government. The media organisations were transferred to the foundation by over a dozen pro-government business "moguls" and were already highly supportive of the government. The move was thus largely symbolic, but nonetheless unprecedented within the EU. One of the foundation's board members announced the foundation has an "undeniably" right-wing agenda and that one of its goals is to prevent "opposition-minded media outlets" from regaining "the prominent market position that they held before Mr. Orban's election". Viktor Orbán argued that in Hungary still the "leftist, liberal media outlets are in majority", and the newly created foundation is a national interest because it is non-profit.

==== Prevention coverage of the treatment of migrants ====
Journalist require government permits to report from near the national border. The government has been accused of blocking journalists' access to refugee camps and immigrant transit centres, restricting refugee-related coverage, and government forces have been accused of forcing journalists to delete footage, physically attacking journalists, and damaging journalists' equipment.

==== Attacks on government critics by pro-government media ====
Pro-government media has been known to attack and deride opposition politicians and other critics, including a high school student who used obscene language to criticize and lampoon the government and Fidesz politicians during a protest.

==== Surveilling journalists ====
According to the findings (released in July 2021) of a collaborative journalistic investigation, multiple journalists as well as businesspeople with media holdings (and possibly others) appear to have been spied on by the Hungarian government with Pegasus spyware. Hungarian diplomats posted in European countries regularly gather information about the foreign travel of Hungarian journalists (including from government officials of host countries) and relay the gathered information to the Hungarian government via diplomatic cables. Some embassies have also compiled information about links of Hungarian journalists with media organisations in the diplomats' host countries. A senior Foreign Ministry official justified the monitoring by asserting the government is merely tracking left-wing journalists who had been attending courses held by Soros funded organisations abroad.

==== Slovenia-Hungary diplomatic row over press freedom ====
On 22 March 2019, Slovenian weekly political magazine Mladina published an issue with the feature article detailing the intervention of the Slovenian Democratic Party (SDS) within the European People's Party (of which SDS is a member) to prevent Fidesz's exclusion from EPP, reporting that SDS was the pivotal factor in EPP's decision to enact the much more lenient suspension of Fidesz's membership instead of a full ousting. The issue also featured a comical cartoon cover portraying Orbán giving a Nazi salute and wearing a Hungarian flag armband while being amorously embraced by SDS politicians (with one of them holding a Slovenian flag featuring the Hungarian tricolour). Mladina's cover was widely covered by Hungarian opposition media. Mladina has long been known for its satirical and politically provocative covers. The portrayal of Orbán as a Nazi was harshly criticised by Hungary's ambassador to Slovenia, and by the Hungarian press secretary. The ambassador's protest was lampooned by the magazine, which published a "corrected and courteous" cover, now portraying Orbán, with a flower in his hair, extending an olive branch, while Mladina's cartoonist jestingly published a sarcastic "apology".

On 5 April, the Slovenian Foreign Ministry dismissed a formal request by the Hungarian embassy on the topic of the contentious Mladina cover that called on Slovene authorities to assist the Hungarian government in preventing "similar incidents" from occurring in the future because "the Hungarian embassy in Ljubljana is convinced that actions such as the publication of the aforementioned cover harm the otherwise excellent bilateral cooperation between the countries". The Ministry responded by stating "[we] strictly respect the freedom of speech and freedom of the press and would never interfere in any of the media's editorial policy". The request was condemned by the Slovenian Journalists' Association, multiple MPs of Slovenia's governing coalition, the president, prime minister, and other prominent politicians, with one MP announcing that he will be requesting that the parliamentary Committee on Culture and Foreign Policy be convened over the issue. Multiple diplomats and experts also expressed consternation over what they described as an unprecedented/"unheard of" diplomatic move.

=== Freedom of the judiciary ===
The Fidesz government has been accused of removing independent judges, stacking the Constitutional Court and judicial institutions with loyalists, and appointing as chief prosecutor a former party member who has seldom pursued corruption charges against Fidesz politicians. In 2011, the government lowered the mandatory retirement age from 70 to 62, forcing judges to retire and freeing up vacancies for appointments by the government. In 2012, the government was criticized by the Venice Commission for concentrating too much power in a single official, the head of the then recently established National Judicial Office.

In 2018, Tünde Handó, the government's judicial chief with close personal ties to Orbán and Fidesz, was accused by an independent panel of senior judges of abusing her function to interfere with the appointment process for senior judges in a move that confirmed longstanding accusations by individual judges and the political opposition. Handó unsuccessfully attempted to prevent the council from convening to frustrate the release of the report. A flurry of judges' resignations prior to the report's release had also fueled suspicions that "something ... sinister was afoot".

==== Constitutional Court ====
Fidesz dismantled a Constitution Court nominations committee that was originally staffed by representatives of all parliamentary parties to ensure consensus, instead taking complete control over the nomination process. The size of the Constitutional Court was expanded to allow for stacking by Fidesz appointees. This resulted in all Constitutional Court judges being appointees of Fidesz after 8 years of its rule, with multiple judges having close connections to the party and the Constitutional Court consistently voting in line with the Fidesz government. In instances where laws were struck down by the Court as unconstitutional, the Fidesz-dominated parliament simply amended to Constitution. The authority of the Constitutional Court was also constricted by the new Constitution in 2011 in a move that further drained power away from the judicial branch.

==== "Parallel court system" for public administration matters ====
The Fidesz-dominated parliament has altered the Constitution to establish a "parallel court system" to handle cases pertaining to public administration, leading to fears that the new courts would be stacked by government loyalists and used to approve contentious politically motivated reforms and actions ("for instance dismissing challenges to government decisions, penalizing civil servants whose loyalty to Mr. Orbán is in doubt, or rejecting freedom of information requests from journalists investigating government corruption"). The government has argued that such a reform of the judicial system is in keeping with European and international norms and recommendations, and that the system will be independent and more efficient.

=== Independent institutions ===
The Fidesz government appointed former party politicians to non-partisan oversight institutions that were created as checks on government power after the fall of the Communist regime. The institutions involved included the State Audit Office, the State Prosecution Service, and the National Fiscal Council.

==== Independence of the Hungarian central bank ====
In 2011, the government proposed legislation that could endanger the independence of the Hungarian central bank, according to the then head of the organisation, András Simor. The law was also criticized by European Central Bank president Mario Draghi. Due to the controversial central bank reforms, IMF and European Commission representatives walked away from 2011 negotiations about providing assistance for the heavily indebted Hungary. A Fidesz loyalist was later appointed to head the central bank.

=== Parliamentary process ===
Taking power in 2010 with a supermajority able to propose and pass legislation largely at will, Fidesz has often denied parliament sufficient time to deliberate proposals, sometimes giving only a few hours' notice before discussions on proposals and only allowing a few hours of debate. The laws were also often presented by low-ranking lawmakers that had neither written nor read the legislation they were introducing.

=== Elections ===
Between 1990 and 2010, the National Assembly of Hungary used a complex, three-tier system to fill its 386 seats: one part was elected through a two-round system in single-member districts, another through a one-round regional list proportional representation, and a third were national top-up seats calculated from the wasted votes of the two other paths. This system, in accordance with Duverger's law, produced a multi-party polarization, in which Fidesz became the right-wing's primary party, until 2010, where, thanks to a decimated and divided opposition, Fidesz won a two-thirds supermajority with half of the votes. The ensuing Fidesz supermajority government then acted to reform the electoral system by introducing parallel voting, and reduced the number of seats in the National Assembly by half, down to 199 seats. About half of these seats would be filled through plurality voting in redrawn and larger single-member districts, while the other half would be elected through a national list proportional representation. This electoral system, used since 2014, incentivizes unity, which so far has benefited Fidesz against a still-fragmented opposition. As a result, the left-liberal parties and Jobbik decided to form a united front for the 2022 elections. Opposition parties and critics have warned of possible gerrymandering.

==== Promotion of fake parties ====
The government passed legislation setting up lax requirements and financial incentives for creating new political parties. The resulting proliferation of fake parties has further divided the opposition vote. Fidesz candidates have been accused of directly colluding with the "bogus parties" to prop them up.

==== Expanding the electorate by easing citizenship criteria for ethnic Hungarians living abroad ====
By expanding the ability to easily gain citizenship to ethnic Hungarians abroad with a 2010 law, Fidesz was able to greatly expand its electorate; about 10% of the current electorate acquired voting rights due to the measure, with 95% of these voting Fidesz.

==== Embargo on opposition political ads in state media ====
The government has also been accused of blocking opposition candidates from publishing ads in state media while allowing the same for Fidesz candidates.

==== Use of government resources for electioneering ====
The Organization for Security and Co-operation in Europe, an international election observer, has accused Fidesz of using government resources to bolster its electoral chances, "[blurring] the line between state and party" during the 2018 parliamentary election. It also reported "media bias, and opaque campaign financing", describing the election as "free but not entirely fair".

=== Surveillance of political opponents ===
==== Black Cube ====
In 2018, Black Cube supported Viktor Orban's re-election campaign gaining taped telephone conversations of individuals associated with George Soros who was actively opposing Orban's re-election. According to Tamar Zandberg, Hungary was “carrying out an anti-Semitic campaign against Soros” and that Benjamin Netanyahu, which she stated that his Likud has dangerous ties to "extreme right-wing parties in Europe", openly supported Orban's anti-Semitic re-election campaign. She stated that Black Cube's support for Orban is an "Israeli embarrassment."

==== Pegasus ====
The government of Viktor Orbán authorized the use of Pegasus by Hungarian intelligence and law enforcement services to target the government's political opponents. The Orban government has been accused of using it to spy on members of media as well as on Hungarian opposition. According to the findings released in July 2021, journalists and managers of media holdings appear to have been spied on by the Hungarian government with Pegasus. Phone numbers of at least 10 lawyers, at least 5 journalists, and an opposition politician were included on a leaked list of potential Pegasus surveillance targets. In November 2021, Lajos Kósa, head of a parliamentary defense and law enforcement committee, was the first Hungarian senior official who acknowledged that the country's Interior Ministry purchased and used Pegasus. Kósa admitted that Hungary had indeed purchased and used Pegasus, stating "I don't see anything objectionable in it ... large tech companies carry out much broader monitoring of citizens than the Hungarian state does."

=== Civil society ===
The Orbán government has been accused of infringing on a free civil society. The government's crackdown on civil society organisations has been criticized as an assault on the only bastion of democratic checks and balances and opposition to the Fidesz government and its agenda.

==== Central European University, Open Society Foundations, and role of George Soros ====
Fidesz's attacks on civil society organisations are often combined with attacks on Hungarian-born financier George Soros whom they accuse of attempting to undermine the traditional Hungarian and European societal values by surreptitiously and insidiously promoting mass migration through covert channels that include NGOs. After 35 years, Soros' Open Society Foundations relocated from Budapest to Berlin in 2018 due to the increasingly hostile attitude the government has taken against the organisation and its founder. The Hungarian government passed a bill allegedly targeting the Soros-funded Central European University that effectively prevented CEU's operation. The law was denounced both domestically and internationally as it was perceived as infringing upon academic freedom. CEU announced it was closing down due to government pressure in December 2018.

==== Funding of NGOs ====
The National Cooperation Fund, headed by László Csizmadia, a vocal Fidesz supporter, has preferentially tended to support groups with religious and nationalist aims, with three of the top recipient organisations led by Fidesz politicians. Csizmadia, a right-wing theorist, has on numerous occasions written about his belief that the function of NGOs should be to "preserve national identity and uphold Christian values" and that civil society should be subjugated to the will of the government to enact the will of the people.

The government funding squeeze of non-loyal NGOs has left these starved of resources; NGOs have thus increasingly turned to foreign donors to finance their operations, in particular, the Norwegian government, and the Soros-headed Open Society Foundation. The government had subsequently raided some organisations distributing Norwegian funds while accusing recipients of being beholden to foreign powers. In a meeting with a government minister, PM Orbán reportedly labelled NGOs as "foreign-funded enemies of the state" that he wished to eliminate. The Hungarian government has cracked down on NGOs that receive foreign donations; such organisations have to register with authorities and follow stringent rules to declare their foreign funding (including on all websites and publications) or risk fines or termination.

==== NGOs and the "Stop Soros Law" ====
In 2018, the government also passed laws (the "Stop Soros Law") that financially sanction any NGO that "promotes illegal migration", threaten activists that organize or support migration or carry out work contrary to "Hungary's national security interests" with restraining orders preventing them from approaching the border, criminalize assistance to asylum seekers ("facilitating illegal immigration") (thus potentially threatening activists, lawyers, and NGO employees with prison sentences), allow the banishing of foreign citizens who support migration from the country, and vest the interior minister with the authority to review organisations involved in immigration advocacy and forbid them if they are deemed to represent a "national security risk". The reform has been widely condemned, including by the UN, and Amnesty International. In 2018, the youth wing of Fidesz engaged in a campaign marking the buildings of civil organisations with red stickers with the message "This organization supports immigration".

==== Promotion of Hungarian nationalism in schools ====
The government has battled educators over textbook content that promotes a narrative of ethnocentrism and Hungarian victimhood. The government line has been pushed into school textbooks; history textbooks present Orbán's views on the threat of immigration, going on to state that "It can be problematic for different cultures to coexist", and the high school curriculum has been expanded to include teaching the new Fidesz-passed Hungarian Constitution (that includes provisions that may discriminate against religious minorities).

==== Independence of universities ====
Funding of university departments has been transferred to government-appointed supervisors in a move the government argues was intended to reduce costs. In 2020, the Fidesz-led government attempted to transfer the management of the Budapest University of Theater and Film Arts to a foundation headed by an Orban ally who wanted to make the university more "national" and "Christian", with students protesting the plan by occupying the university building. In 2021, the Fidesz-led government introduced a law that would transfer the ownership of state university to foundations, which would be headed - according to PM Orban - by nationalists, with people with "internationalist" or "globalist" views disqualified from holding administrative positions in the foundations. The opposition criticised the push to transfer the control over universities to foundation as attempt by Fidesz to extend its control over the universities even in the even of an electoral loss.

==== Politisation of universities and artistic institutions ====
Fidesz appointees and loyalists have also come to dominate artistic institutions and universities. Art exhibitions and plays have begun to assume nationalist and anti-Western undertones. The government wields the authority to appoint theatre directors, and it has, in one instance, appointed a director who pledged to promote Hungarian values and combat liberalism, and attract audiences that believe in a "nation state", while in another instance summoning a theatre director that was appointed by the previous government and produced plays that questioned "Hungarian national narratives" for questioning by Parliament and later refusing to renew his contract. The government also recruited a group of right-wing artists with ties to Fidesz and turned it into a government agency with the power to distribute stipends and prizes to artists that displayed a "clear national commitment".

"The government is using its democratic legitimacy not only to reform the state but to reform the society" said professor Andras Patyi who had headed a new university established by Fidesz to train future civil servants, police, and soldiers, adding that other leaders in democratic societies have commonly attempted to do the same.

==== Reprisals against critical religious institutions ====
Religious organisations critical of the Fidesz government have allegedly been selectively denied legal status and funding. Religious institutions had historically dependent upon significant government subsidies. Loss of legal status would result in the loss of government and taxpayer funds. The law was deemed a violation of religious freedom by the European Court of Human Rights in 2014, but the Hungarian government refused to properly amend it. The government asserted the reform was necessary to address widespread abuse of the system while some government officials said the law needed to be amended but blamed a lack of cooperation from the opposition.

== Cronyism and corruption ==
The Fidesz government has been accused of corruption and of fostering a "clique of loyal oligarchs". Hungary's corruption assessment has worsened significantly according to World Bank data despite a regional trend in the opposite direction. The EU anti-fraud agency has launched multiple investigation into misuse of EU funds by people close to PM Orbán, including a company owned by Orbán's son-in-law. The government has been accused of punishing non-loyal businesspeople with punitive taxes and regulation. A Hungarian economist described the government's economic shenanigans as "authoritarian capitalism", while some Hungarian and international experts have described post-2010 Hungary as a kleptocracy. During the first 6 years of the Fidesz government, 5 of Orbán's closest associates were awarded ~5% of all public procurement contracts, totaling $2.5bn. The Fidesz government has been accused of diverting billions of euros of EU and federal funds toward loyal allies and relatives (with those who fell out of favour with the party also ceasing being granted the lucrative contracts).

== Civil rights violations and discrimination against minorities ==
=== Antisemitism ===
==== Memorialisation of antisemitic figures ====
Fidesz has been accused of antisemitism due to the memorialisation of certain historic figures associated with Hungarian nationalism by Fidesz politicians. In 2012, prominent Fidesz politicians Máté Kocsis and Sándor Lezsák unveiled a statue of Cécile Tormay, an enthusiastic supporter of Adolf Hitler, in Budapest. This event was also supported by István Tarlós, Fidesz Mayor of Budapest. However a proposal to name a street after Tormay was suspended by Tarlós following an international outcry about this. Fidesz supports the rehabilitation of Miklos Horthy, a controversial figure serving as regent of Hungary during the interwar period and World War II period.

==== Vilification of George Soros ====
Hungarian-born American billionaire George Soros, who is Jewish, has been repeatedly targeted by Fidesz in its campaigns and national surveys. These attacks, which among other things accuse him of masterminding a Europe-wide conspiracy to open Hungary's borders and flood the country with refugees, frequently reproduce antisemitic tropes. In March 2018, Orbán said of Soros: "We are fighting an enemy that is different from us. Not open, but hiding; not straightforward but crafty; not honest but base; not national but international; does not believe in working but speculates with money; does not have its own homeland but feels it owns the whole world."

==== Holocaust revisionism ====
In 2019 the Holocaust Remembrance Project published the Holocaust Revisionism Report in which they highlighted holocaust revisionism of EU countries and highlighted the position of Hungary in this. They stated that "The Hungarian (Fidesz) government is minimising its country's participation in the genocide, rehabilitating war criminals, and introducing anti-Semitic writers into the national curriculum." The report describes the Fidesz party as engaging in "dangerous memory politics".

==== Antisemitic comments by Fidesz politicians ====
In 2008, Zsolt Bayer, one of the founding members of Fidesz, wrote the following in Magyar Hírlap: "In 1967, Jewish journalists in Budapest were still vilifying Israel. Today, the same Jewish journalists are vilifying the Arabs. And the Fidesz. And us. Because they hate us more than we hate them. They are our reason-Jews - you understand: their very existence justifies antisemitism." More than a hundred Hungarian intellectuals protested against the opinion piece in an open letter, including Ibolya Dávid, leader of the Hungarian Democratic Forum, and Gábor Demszky, Mayor of Budapest.

In a 2009 television interview, then-Fidesz MP Oszkár Molnár said that "I love my homeland, love the Hungarians and give primacy to Hungarian interests over those of global capital – Jewish capital, if you like – which wants to devour the entire world, especially Hungary." He claimed that students in Jerusalem schools were taught in the Hungarian language, citing this as evidence of a Jewish conspiracy to take over Hungary. Molnár's comments were widely criticised by the Jewish community and other parties, but Fidesz refused to denounce him nor expel him from the party; Viktor Orbán, however, described the claims as "embarrassing".

In 2013, Magyar Narancs published audio recordings of Ferenc Haszilló, the Fidesz mayor of Kecel, saying that "the Jews control the country, but the gypsy children deserve a slap" and that "the parliament should reinstate the death penalty and execute five or six liberal Jewish politicians". Haszilló promised to leave the party after the leak, but he did not, and Fidesz nominated him for re-election as mayor in 2019. Lajos Kósa, the party's deputy leader, said Haszilló regretted what he had said earlier.

In 2015, Gábor Huszár, the Fidesz mayor of Szentgotthárd, said in response to the November terrorist attacks in Paris: "I want everyone to accept that what happened in Paris is clear proof that certain business circles, and I am saying this here, which is most likely the Jewish state, want to align the Christian Europe against Islam, so the establishment of this camp has nothing to do with the events in Paris." The mayor's remarks were condemned by Israel's embassy in Hungary, as well as by the Hungarian Socialist Party and Politics Can Be Different, who called for Huszár's resignation. In its response, Fidesz said that Huszár said what he said as a private citizen, so they had nothing to do with it.

=== Immigration ===
==== Depriving detained migrants of food ====
The European Court of Human Rights has rebuked the Hungarian government for failing to provide food to asylum seekers residing in Hungarian detention centres.

==== Vague law potentially outlawing aid to migrants ====
The "Stop Soros" law outlawing support or promotion of illegal immigration has been criticized for being so vague as to potentially criminalize providing humanitarian aid to immigrants; giving food for undocumented migrants on the street, distributing information about the asylum process, providing migrants with financial assistance, or even attending political rallies in support of immigrants' rights.

==== Exploiting immigration for political gain ====
The Fidesz government has been accused of using an illusory spectre of immigration for its political gain; despite decreasing numbers of migrants making their way into the region, the government escalated its rhetoric on immigration.

==== Increasing economic migration ====
Due to socioeconomic factors, the Orbán government increased the extent of economic migration into the country, despite Orbán's previous statements denouncing foreign workers. Reportedly, the government's anti-immigration sentiment has fueled social strife between Hungarian and foreign workers. Hungarian trade unions also voiced fears that the increase in low-wage foreign labourers could suppress overall wages.

=== LGBT issues ===
In 2021, the Hungarian parliament passed a bill that featured provisions banning depictions of LGBT persons in media or educational materials that may be viewed by underage persons. The stated goal of the provisions was to prevent underage persons from viewing content that promotes homosexuality or gender change. The law bans the portrayal of LGBT persons, characters, or symbols on television outside of watershed time, bans LGBT issues from being mentioned in school educational materials, bans advertisements that feature favourable portrayals of LGBT persons if underage persons may be the audience, and creates an official registry of sex educators permitted to conduct sex education classes in schools. As of November 2024, no educators have been allowed to do so. The law also put limits on sales of literature that features LGBT topics, requiring such children's books to be sold in closed packaging, and forbids the sale of such books or other media in the vicinity of churches or schools. The legislation was also seen as conflating homosexuality with paedophilia. Leaders of 17 EU countries signed a joint statement condemning of the legislation and threatening to challenge the legislation in court over human rights violations if it were not withdrawn. The legislation was also denounced by the president of the European Commission.

== Conflict with the EU ==
In general Fidesz supports and has implemented policies of "soft-Euroscepticism."

=== Conflict with EU institutions and the "dance of the peacock" strategy ===
Orbán was on multiple occasions also rebuffed by various institutions of the European Union. In a speech, Orbán boasted to his supporters that he had been out-maneuvering EU institutions by implementing contentious policies without excessively provoking them and incurring only painless criticism instead of any real push-back (a tactic he has dubbed "the dance of the peacock").

=== Push to suspend Hungary's voting rights within the EU in the European Parliament ===
In September 2018, the European Parliament voted to suspend Hungary's voting rights within the EU, accusing it of breaching democratic norms and EU's core values. Poland however vowed to veto the sanctions immediately after the European Parliament voted to pursue the sanctions against Hungary. The move was the first step in a procedural process to sanction the Hungarian government that could result in the country losing its EU voting rights were it to be successfully completed, marking the first instance of the punitive process' use in the history of the EU. "A report detailing Hungary's alleged breaches of democratic norms, which was used to justify European Parliament's disciplinary action, cited violations including weakening media plurality, crackdowns on civil society and moves towards limiting educational freedom." Members of the Hungarian government challenged the legality of the vote saying that the just made decision of not counting abstentions as votes cast is irregular and because only by violating rules was it possible to reach the necessary two-thirds majority. Péter Szijjártó, Hungary's FM stated "it's a collection of qualified lies" and they will challenge the vote with the EP's leadership

=== Comments regarding death penalty ===
On policy grounds, Orbán and his government also came into conflict with the EU by voicing support for the possible reintroduction of the death penalty within Hungary (EU rules prohibit the death penalty for all member states) and by clashing with the EU over the handling of the European migrant crisis.

=== Conflict with the EPP ===
Fidesz has also come into conflict with the EPP; after 12 member parties called for Fidesz's expulsion or suspension, Fidesz's membership was suspended by a mutual agreement. Orbán has also suggested that Fidesz is considering leaving the EPP voluntarily.

=== Fidesz's advertising campaign criticising the EU ===
Fidesz has also been condemned by EU politicians and institutions for launching a government campaign - involving ads, billboards, and letters sent to all citizens - that suggested that EU's immigration policy is being controlled by Soros (who is depicted standing behind and smiling with Jean-Claude Juncker with the subtext reading "‘You have the right to know what Brussels is planning to do ... compulsory relocation quotas"). In response to the political ad campaign, the leader of the EPP has demanded Orbán apologize for and renounce the criticism levied against EU by him and his party or face Fidesz's suspension from the EPP.

== Anti-government protests ==
=== Internet tax protests ===
After the government revealed a plan to tax internet users' traffic in 2014, up to 100,000 people gathered in a series of protests. Facing widespread opposition, the government reduced the proposed tax rates, however, discontent and protests continued. The design of the tax was also criticized by the European Commission. The plan was eventually scrapped by the government entirely.

=== Overtime law ===
In late 2018, the government amended the labour code to increase maximum overtime from 250h to 400h, and delaying the employee compensation deadline from 1 to 3 years. In some instances, the law would also allow employers to compensate workers at the regular hourly rate for overtime work. The changes were motivated by the country's labour shortage, and sparked a wave of protests and opposition. Opponents dubbed the proposed changes the "Slave law". The government says the labor reforms are necessary to provide much-needed support for businesses struggling to cope with a shortage of workers. The jobless rate in Hungary has dropped to a near all-time low of 3.7 percent, while the number of unfilled jobs has reportedly doubled to a record high in the last three years.

The protests that initially opposed the "Slave law" soon evolved to also voice opposition to the nature and actions of the ruling government in general, with multiple opposition parties joining the protests in solidarity. The protests, with the number of attendants peaking at about 15,000, have been one of the most significant shows of public opposition to the Fidesz government. A government spokesman dismissed the notion of popular support for the protests.

=== Budapest Pride criticism ===
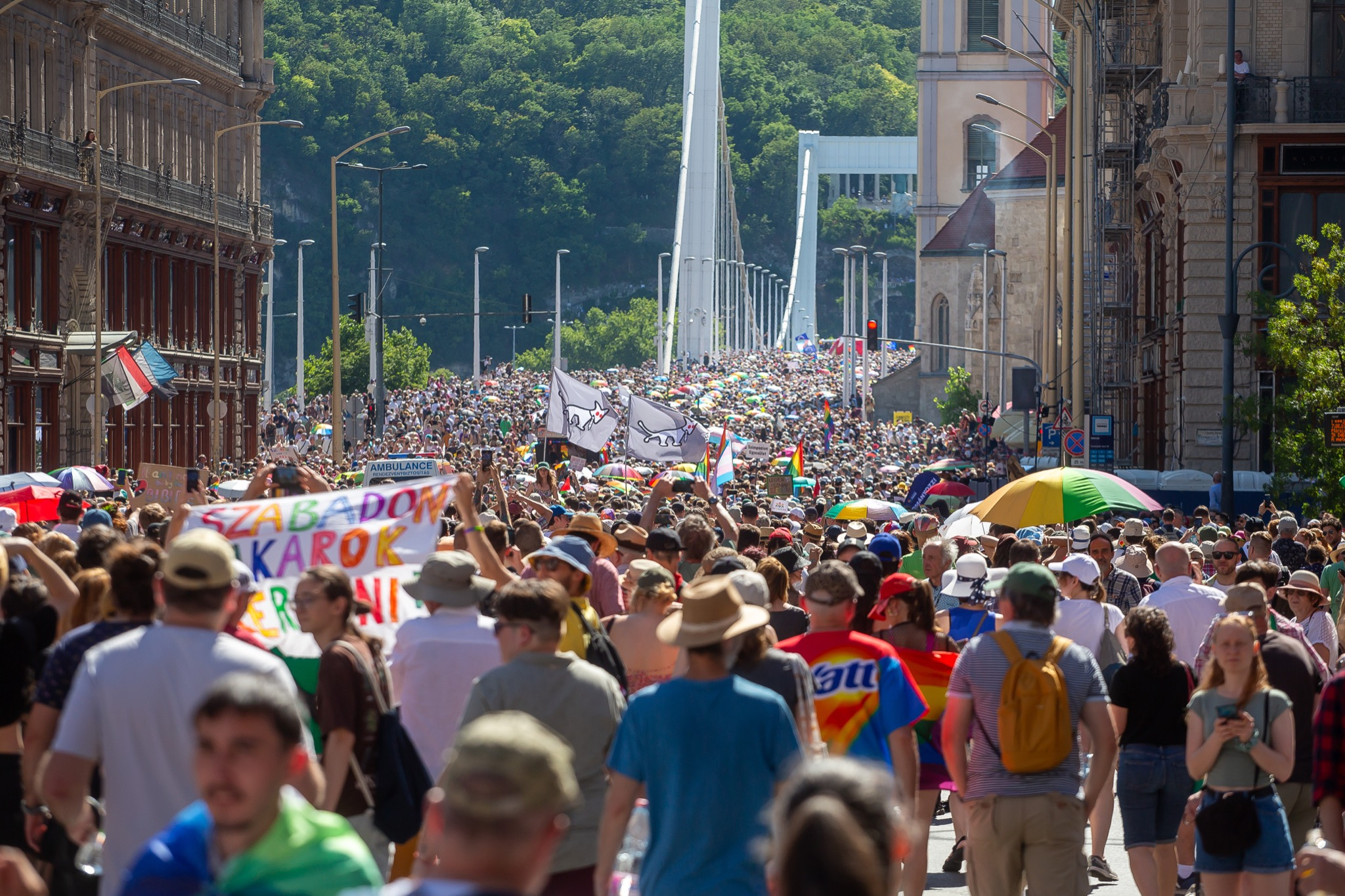
Thousands of people flooded the streets and the Elisabeth Bridge.

The 2025 Budapest Pride was held despite it being banned, becoming the largest Budapest Pride with between 100,000 and 200,000 people attending, many of whom were first-timers who stated that this march was not just for the protection of sexual minorities' rights, but also for the country's democratic future. The parade became the country's largest anti-government demonstration in years.

Protests broke out in Hungarian and European cities opposing the ban. Mayor of Budapest Gergely Karácsony, Commissioner for Human Rights of the Council of Europe Michael O'Flaherty, President of the European Commission Ursula von der Leyen, the UN High Commissioner for Human Rights Volker Türk, and many countries' politicians have all opposed the ban. Thirty-three embassies have issued a joint statement in support of LGBTQ people's rights. Twenty EU countries have also made a similar joint statement. Vice President of the far-right Our Homeland Movement party Előd Novák said that the government made a fool of themselves for making a law and then not executing it.
