= Samurai (disambiguation) =

A samurai is a member of the Japanese warrior caste.

Samurai may also refer to:

== Film and television ==
- The Last Samurai, a 2003 epic period action drama film directed and produced by Edward Zwick
- Samurai (2002 film), a 2002 Indian Tamil-language film starring Vikram
- Le Samouraï, a 1967 French film also known as The Samurai
- The Samurai (TV series), a Japanese historical fiction TV series of the 1960s
- Samurai Trilogy, a film trilogy starring Toshirō Mifune as Miyamoto Musashi
- Power Rangers Samurai, a series in the Power Rangers franchise
- Samurai (1978), a TV film produced by Universal Television for ABC
- "Samurai", an episode of Power Rangers: SPD

== Games ==
- Samurai, a wargame by Avalon Hill
- Samurai (board game), a German-style board game
- Samurai (Videopac game), a 1979 video game for the Magnavox Odyssey
- Samurai, the Indian name of the Nintendo Entertainment System video game console
- Samurai Shodown, name of a fighting game series by SNK Playmore
- Samurai (Dungeons & Dragons), a character class in the roleplaying game
- SAMURAI, a fictional rock band in the Cyberpunk universe, performed by Refused

== Literature ==
- Samurai!, an autobiographical book by Martin Caidin, based on the life and career of Saburō Sakai
- The Samurai (novel), a 1980 novel by Shusaku Endo

== Music ==
- Samurai (Die Apokalyptischen Reiter album), a heavy metal album released 2004
- Samurai (Matti Nykänen album), released 1993
- "Samurai" (song), a 1985 song by Michael Cretu
- "Samurai", song by Dschinghis Khan from Dschinghis Khan (album)
- Samurai, a 2021 mixtape by Beny Jr and el Guincho
- Samurai (Lupe Fiasco album), a hip-hop album released 2024

== People ==
- Samurai Jay (born 1998), Italian rapper and singer-songwriter

== Sports ==
- "Samurai Japan", the nickname of the Japan national baseball team
- "Samurai", the nickname of the Japan national Australian rules football team
- "Samurai Blue", the nickname of the Japan national football team

== Other ==
- Samurai (beverage), an energy drink in the Philippines and Vietnam
- Samurai (ride), a ride at Thorpe Park and Lagoon Amusement Park
- Samurai bond, a Japanese Yen-denominated bond issued by a foreign entity
- Suzuki Samurai, a small SUV
- SAMURAI, a 2008–2011 European Union surveillance research program
