= Bader Al Samari =

Saudi writer, novelists and screenwriter

- Born: 1974; Dhahran, Saudi Arabia
- Occupation(s): Writer, novelist, screenwriter

Bader Al Samari, (Arabic:بدر السماري) a Saudi screenwriter, novelist, and writer, was born in 1974. He has published two novels and two books. He consulted on the story for the movie "Born a King" which was written by Henry Fitzherbert.

Bader Al Samari was born in 1974, in Dhahran which is located in eastern Saudi Arabia. He worked as secretary for the "Story Club" in KSA and contributed in founding "Jasad Al Thakafa" website. He writes poems, stories, and critical readings and published them mainly in "Voice of Emirates" and "Takween" magazine. Al Samari's literary career began in 2011 when he published his first novel titled "Ibn Tariq". A year later, he published his second book "What Came From the Narrators' Mouths". Whereas, Al Samari published his third book "Narrators' Speeches" in 2013, which is a collection of words and speeches by narrative writers that he chose and translated. In 2014, he published his second novel "Iritiab" (Doubt) which was the bestselling novel in Riyadh Book Fair 2014.

Al Samari consulted on the story for the 2019 movie "Born a King" which tells the story of King Faisal bin Abdulaziz's visit to Britain in 1919, when he was only 13 years old. The idea of producing this movie came when Al Samari met with the Spanish producer Andres Gomez in 2015. Gomez told Al Samari that he had read a historical book about the history of King Faisal and that he wants to make a movie about him. The movie was released in 2019.

== Works ==
=== Novels ===
- "Tarraq's Son" (original title: Ibn Tarraq), 2011
- "Doubt" (original title: Irtiab), 2014

=== Books ===
- "What Came From the Narrators' Mouths" (original title: Ma Sakata Min Afwah Al Ruwat), 2012
- "Narrators' Speeches" (original title: Hadith Al Ruwat), 2013

=== Screenplay ===
- Born A King, 2019
