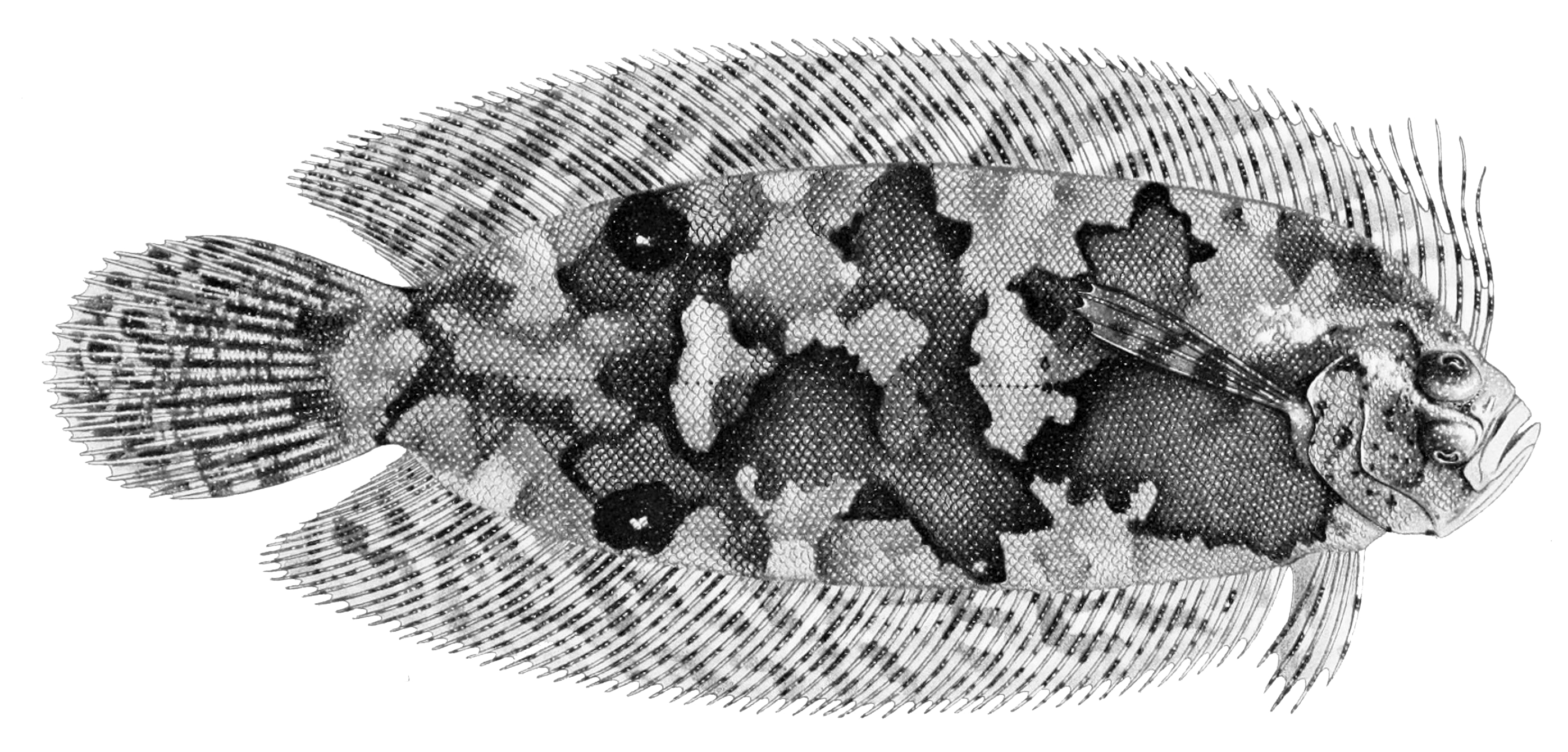
- Samariscus corallines

Scientific classification
- Kingdom: Animalia
- Phylum: Chordata
- Class: Actinopterygii
- Order: Carangiformes
- Suborder: Pleuronectoidei
- Family: Samaridae; Jordan & Goss, 1889

Genera
- Plagiopsetta; Samaretta; Samaris; Samariscus

= Samaridae =

Family of fishes

Samaridae (crested flounders) is a family of crested flounders, small flatfishes native to the Indo-Pacific. The family contains four genera with a total of 29 species.

== Taxonomy ==
Samaridae is one of eight families a part of the SuperFamily Soleioidea. This SuperFamily is of the suborder Pleuronectoidei within the order Pleuronectiformes. Samaridae were formerly classified as a subfamily of Pleuronectidae.

== Anatomy and morphology ==
Young flat fish are bilaterally symmetrical until they reach between 5 and 120mm in length when one eye shifts from the lower side to the upper side until it is adjacent to the other eye. Adult flat fish swim and lie on the side without eyes.

Adult Samaridae are not bilaterally symmetrical but do have symmetrical pelvic fins. They have a highly compressed body with eyes that bulge above the body surface which allows them to see out while buried beneath a surface.

Samaridae have countershaded coloring with a darker pigment on the top of the fish and a lighter pigment on bottom. They have a stabilizing dorsal fin on top of the fish that stems from a point in front of the eyes. They have a basic lateral line organ to detect the movement of the water around them and lack a postcletherium.

Samaridae can range between 4 and 23 centimeters at length depending on the species. Samaridae have no spines in their fins with a protruding lower jaw and an asymmetrical nose located on the lower side opposite the eyes.

== Habitat ==
The Samaridae are native to marine areas in the Indo-Pacific region, from South Africa to Hawaii and New Caledonia. They are found in tropical and subtropical areas in deep-water Benthic zones. They are found in saltwater only. Samaridae can also be found near coastal regions with coral reefs up to depths of 150 meters.

== Behavior ==
=== Locomotion ===
Samaridae are negatively buoyant and while they are able to swim through the water column, they spend most of their time on the ocean floor. While swimming, the flatfish keeps its head up through a mechanism of support from the median, pectoral, and pelvic fins.

Samaridae move across the sea floor through propulsion by the tail and assisted by the pectoral fins. Flatfish move into the water column by turning its body and propelling itself upwards through propulsion by the tail and body, and continue to move via the "swim and glide" method of short bursts of propulsion.

=== Burying ===
One way that Samaridae avoid predation is by burying themselves underneath the sand on the ocean floor. They do this by repeatedly hitting their head and body against the sand so it lifts up and falls down on top of the flatfish. This process lasts only a few seconds and is a very effective tool in avoiding detection by predators.

=== Reproduction ===
Samaridae reach sexual maturity between 1 and 15 years of age. Flatfish reproduction takes place over 3 stages: courtship, spawning rise, and a post-spawning return to the sea floor.

In Courtship, male flatfish follow female flatfish to the bottom of the sea floor. If the courtship is successful, they rise above the floor, the gametes are released, and then the flatfish return to the seafloor.

=== Feeding ===
Samaridae are carnivorous. Flatfish are predominantly visual feeders, meaning they use their eyes to scan their environments for prey. Flatfish are able to protrude their eyes and raise their head to enhance their ability to search for prey. Most visual feeders consume free moving prey or sedentary benthic prey. Samaridae also use the lateral line to detect motion in the water and track prey.

Predation by flatfish occurs in 3 stages: Pursuit, Stalking, and Ambush.

1. In Predation, flatfish use speed to overcome prey.
2. In Stalking, flatfish use stealthy motion to approach prey before pouncing.
3. In Ambush, flatfish use countershading and burying to remain still until prey are within striking distance.

== Human impact ==
=== Fishing ===
Fishing gear and seafloor trawling has an impact on flatfish species. Samaridae do not detect the approaching of trawling gear until it is less than 1 meter away. The net used encourages herding behavior, which lasts around 1 minute and ends when the fish either escapes or is caught in the net.

A decrease in water temperature can lead to slowing muscle contraction and a reduction in the speed and endurance of flatfish, making them easier to catch in trawls.
