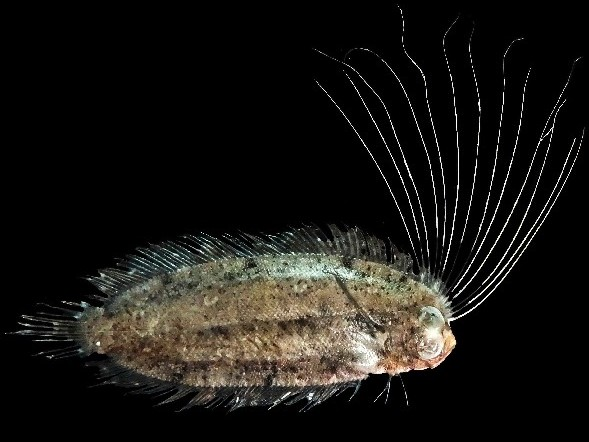
- Samaris cristatus

Scientific classification
- Kingdom: Animalia
- Phylum: Chordata
- Class: Actinopterygii
- Order: Carangiformes
- Suborder: Pleuronectoidei
- Family: Samaridae
- Genus: Samaris; Gray, 1831

Type species
- Samaris cristatus Gray, 1831

= Samaris =

Genus of fishes

Samaris is a genus of crested flounders native to the Indo-Pacific.

== Species ==
There are currently five recognized species in this genus:

- Samaris chesterfieldensis Mihara & Amaoka, 2004
- Samaris costae Quéro, Hensley & Maugé, 1989
- Samaris cristatus J. E. Gray, 1831 (Cockatoo righteye flounder)
- Samaris macrolepis Norman, 1927 (Large-scale crested righteye flounder)
- Samaris spinea Mihara & Amaoka, 2004
