= Dynasties (2002 TV series) =

Australian factual television show

Dynasties is an Australian factual television show, that looks at Australia's most famous and influential families. This observational documentary series began on the ABC in 2002.

== Episodes ==
=== Series 1 - 2002 ===
- Episode 1 | A Liberal Legacy
- Episode 2 | Quentin's Choice
- Episode 3 | The Wright Stuff
- Episode 4 | The Myers of Melbourne
- Episode 5 | Durack Dreaming
- Episode 6 | The De Bortolis Of Griffith

=== Series 2 -2003 ===
- Episode 1 | Wentworth
- Episode 2 | Rose
- Episode 3 | Boyd
- Episode 4 | Marika
- Episode 5 | Kidman
- Episode 6 | Belgiorno-Nettis

=== Series 3 - 2004 ===
- Episode 1 | The Street Family
- Episode 2 | The Clunies-Ross Family
- Episode 3 | The Ashton Family
- Episode 4 | The Frank Family
- Episode 5 | The Lee Family
- Episode 6 | The Anthony Family

=== Series 4 - 2005 ===
- Episode 1 | Roycroft
- Episode 2 | Archer
- Episode 3 | Forrest
- Episode 4 | Donovan
- Episode 5 | Lea
- Episode 6 | Durack
- Episode 6 | Aarons
- Episode 7 | Jones
- Episode 8 | Mora

=== Series 5 - 2006 ===
- Episode 1 | The Ansett Family
- Episode 2 | The Bullen Family
- Episode 3 | The McGuigan Family
- Episode 4 | The Hayes Family
- Episode 5 | The Zeccola Family
- Special | The Leahy Family
