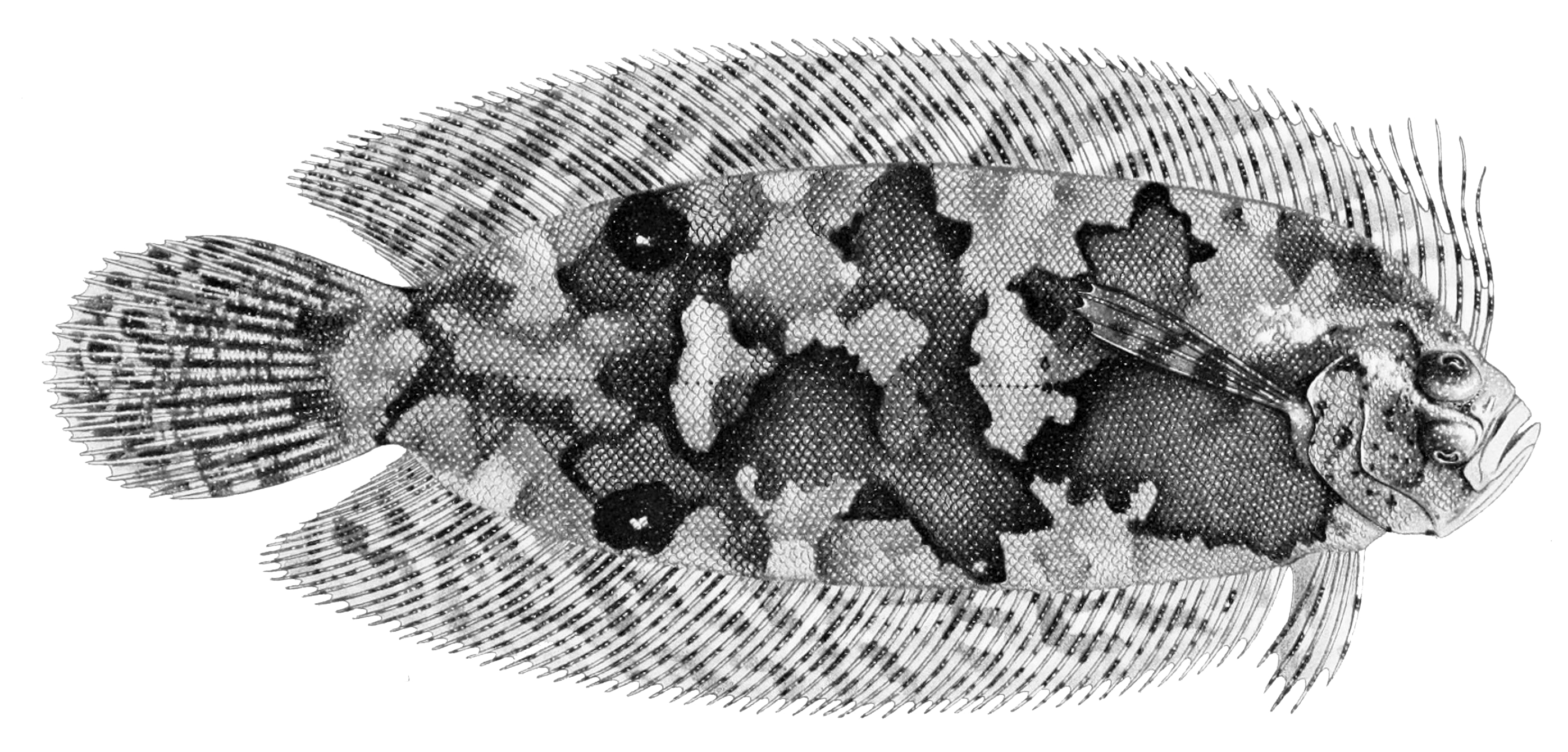
- Coralline-red flounder (S. corallinus)
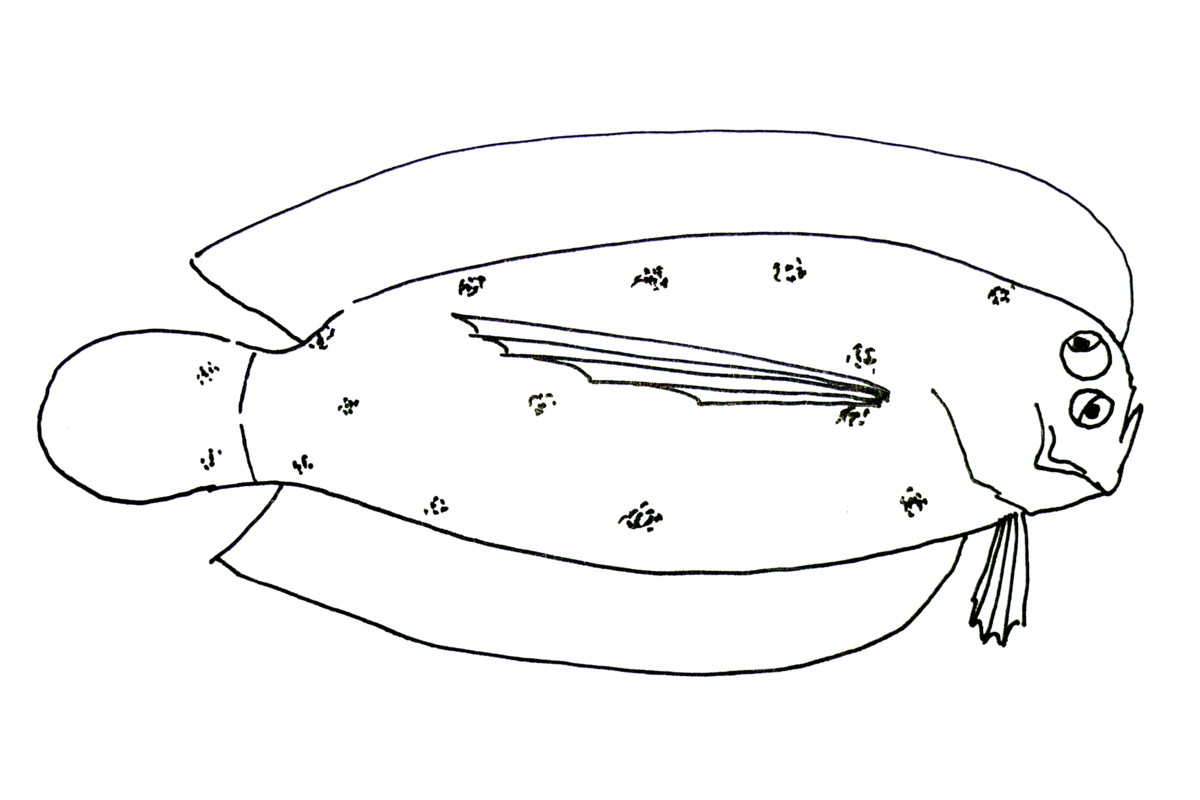
- Long-finned flounder (S. longimanus)

Scientific classification
- Kingdom: Animalia
- Phylum: Chordata
- Class: Actinopterygii
- Order: Carangiformes
- Suborder: Pleuronectoidei
- Family: Samaridae
- Genus: Samariscus; Gilbert, 1905

Type species
- Samariscus corallinus Gilbert, 1905

= Samariscus =

Genus of fishes

Samariscus is a genus of crested flounders native to the Indo-Pacific.

== Species ==
Twenty recognized species are in this genus:

- Samariscus asanoi Ochiai & Amaoka, 1962
- Samariscus corallinus Gilbert, 1905 (coralline-red flounder)
- Samariscus desoutterae Quéro, Hensley & Maugé, 1989
- Samariscus filipectoralis S. C. Shen, 1982
- Samariscus hexaradiatus Díaz de Astarloa, Causse & Pruvost, 2014
- Samariscus huysmani Weber, 1913 (Huysman's righteye flounder)
- Samariscus inornatus (Lloyd, 1909)
- Samariscus japonicus Kamohara, 1936
- Samariscus latus Matsubara & Takamuki, 1951 (deep-body righteye flounder)
- Samariscus leopardus Voronina, 2009
- Samariscus longimanus Norman, 1927 (longfinned flounder)
- Samariscus luzonensis Fowler, 1934 (Luzon righteye flounder)
- Samariscus macrognathus Fowler, 1934 (large-mouth righteye flounder)
- Samariscus maculatus (Günther, 1880) (spotted righteye flounder)
- Samariscus multiradiatus Kawai, Amaoka & Séret, 2008
- Samariscus neocaledonia Kawai, Amaoka & Séret, 2011 (New Caledonian righteye flounder)
- Samariscus nielseni Quéro, Hensley & Maugé, 1989 (Nielsen's righteye flounder)
- Samariscus sunieri Weber & de Beaufort, 1929 (Sunier's righteye flounder)
- Samariscus triocellatus Woods, 1960 (three-spot righteye flounder)
- Samariscus xenicus Ochiai & Amaoka, 1962
