= Corruption in Hungary =

Corruption in Hungary remains a significant problem as the country has posted declining performance in international assessments. In 2023, the country was identified as the worst-performing European Union country in Transparency International's Corruption Perception Index. This decline in Hungary's position in the index covers most of the past decade, highlighting a troubling trend.

== State-capture system and corruption ==
The systemic corruption that Hungary currently faces is attributed to the leadership of Prime Minister Viktor Orbán. Orbán's Fidesz government has changed Hungary's election system, redesigned its electoral districts, and eliminated checks and balances within governance, which was built over the past two decades. Even the judicial system was reshaped as the regime gained full control of state institutions.

The impact of Orbán's regime on corruption is demonstrated in Hungary's shift towards a state capture system, which involves Orbán and the ruling Fidesz party systematically controlling state institutions, resources, and decision-making so that they became instruments of political will and personal gain. As power is consolidated, Orbán and his circle of political elites control the flow of resources, entrenching corruption in the process. This is demonstrated in the case of public procurement.

It is reported that companies with close ties to Orbán and Fidesz are often awarded government contracts. This practice not only bypasses fair competition but also enables misappropriation of funds, as these are often diverted to politically connected individuals and organizations. In addition, the system leads to inflated costs and inefficiencies.

One notable case of corruption in public procurement is the "Elios case." This scandal involved Elios Innovatív Zrt., a company co-owned by Orbán's son-in-law, István Tiborcz. The company won numerous public contracts for street lighting projects, many of which were funded by the European Union. Investigations by the European Anti-Fraud Office (OLAF) revealed irregularities, including collusion, conspiracy, and inflated prices. The Hungarian government ultimately decided not to pursue legal action, further raising concerns about accountability.

The systemic nature of corruption in public procurement and other state agencies is exacerbated by the practice of mass clientelism. This is practiced by the Orbán regime to shore up and maintain political support. This reinforces the network of patronage and cronyism benefitting a small and politically connected elite with uninterrupted access to power and the central government's resources in exchange for their support of the Fidesz government. According to an anti-corruption watchdog, "personal, connection-based corruption not only exists in contemporary Hungary but has become stronger under Orbán." This transpired as the government openly embraced mass clientelism as a means to secure political support.

Notable cases of corruption tied to clientelism include Hungary's "Eastern Opening" policy, which sought closer ties with China. This initiative has been criticized for procurement-related corruption. A policy paper, for instance, revealed that bilateral projects with China have enriched Orbán's networks, further entrenching clientelist corruption. As clientelism becomes rampant, state resources such as workfare programs are also used to condition electoral support, particularly in economically vulnerable regions.

The misappropriation of European Union funds to Hungary is also indicative of corruption cases that stem from Orbán's state capture system and mass clientelism. EU funds intended for development and public welfare were reportedly funneled to businesses and individuals closely tied to Orbán and the Fidesz party. This practice contributes to the oligarchic system in Hungary, dominated by a small circle of politically connected individuals.

The most recent example of the misuse of EU funds was the case of the €1 billion aid that Hungary lost after it was frozen over allegations of corruption, particularly in public procurement. Another notable example involves the Economic Development and Innovation Operational Programme. It was reported that tender grants were manipulated by a structured corruption network that included senior officials and legal entities, who orchestrated the awarding of procurement wins.

== Media, checks and balances ==
In 2010, Freedom House cited the Hungarian media as the 40th freest in the world, but under Orbán's regime, the country fell to 87th place in 2017. This democratic backsliding has undermined Hungary's media outlets through the state-capture system in place. Aside from harassment, Orbán's allies have systematically accumulated over 500 media outlets, ensuring that Orbán and his populist narrative dominate the media landscape. The consolidation transpired under the Central European Press and Media Foundation (KESMA) in 2018. This foundation became the pro-government umbrella of the acquired media outlets, which were previously independent. KESMA's emergence allowed the media landscape to be dominated by reporting that is favorable to Orbán and his government. In this environment dissenting voices and reports on corruption-related issues are marginalized. The absence of information relating to corruption is seen as of national strategic importance and ensures the prevention of corruption investigations. The government's advertising budget also disproportionately favor these pro-government outlets, stifling independent journalism and further entrenching corruption.

== Police corruption ==
Hungarian criminologist Geza Finszter has named Hungary a fundamentally dishonest society. Due to this, real justice is nearly impossible to achieve. Government operations are not transparent. This leads to corruption, which is reflected in many aspects of its society, including politicians, judges, and the police force. Police force corruption affects the criminal investigators who have a greater amount of exposure to corruption than others. They are paid poorly, allowing well-endowed criminals to corrupt them. This corruption in the lower level of the police is not the biggest problem when it comes to police corruption in Hungary.

In the National police Organised Crime Division, high-ranking officers, with possible underworld ties, can choose to proceed or halt sensitive operations. In short if an investigation runs the risk of exposing political or other types of corruption, they tend to more often than not be shut down without much delay. According to Transparency International, many state-run institutions in Hungary are directed by government loyalists, allowing for an easy spread of corruption. It was also found that when it came to reporting corruption in Hungary, 70% of the population would not report instances of corruption due to a mistrust of authorities and a fear of the consequences for doing so. Transparency International claims that the government discourages its citizens when it comes to reporting corruption, as no adequate protection measures have been implemented to help whistleblowers.

Due to Hungary's geographical position which borders the former Yugoslavia and, its political history, it has become a major crossroads for the transportation of narcotics between Asia and Western Europe. According to the International Narcotics Control Strategy Report 2007, Hungarian border control and narcotics police seem to be tackling and resisting corruption to an extent. The report showed that the education of border police was making some difference when it came to the issue of corruption. Contrary to this however, it would appear that when it comes to prosecuting high-profile cases involving organised crime, including drug trafficking, sentences tend to be lenient. It would appear that corruption is systematic and prevalent throughout the entirety of the Hungarian Criminal Justice system reaching as high as Judges and, not just its police force. After being ranked in the bottom third of countries when it comes to corruption, and when looking at the ineffectiveness of the new anti-corruption laws that have been put in place, it is all too clear that corruption seems to be an accepted practice in Hungary's police force, at least for the foreseeable future.

== International rankings ==
Transparency International's 2025 Corruption Perceptions Index (CPI) scored Hungary at 40 on a scale from 0 ("highly corrupt") to 100 ("very clean"). When ranked by score, Hungary ranked 84th among the 182 countries in the Index, where the country ranked first is perceived to have the most honest public sector. For comparison with regional scores, the best score among Western European and European Union countries (Note: Austria, Belgium, Bulgaria, Croatia, Cyprus, Czechia, Denmark, Estonia, Finland, France, Germany, Greece, Hungary, Iceland, Ireland, Italy, Latvia, Lithuania, Luxembourg, Malta, Netherlands, Norway, Poland, Portugal, Romania, Slovakia, Slovenia, Spain, Sweden, Switzerland, and the United Kingdom.) was 89, the average score was 64 and the worst score was 40, which was shared by Hungary and Bulgaria. Transparency International commented in 2025 about Hungary's 2024 score of 41, "Prime Minister Victor Orbán's 15-year-long rule has been marked by systemic corruption and a continuous decline of the rule of law in Hungary (41), whose CPI score has dropped 14 points since 2012. Even the withholding of €20 billion in EU funds has failed to compel the Orbán-regime to restore rule of law and democracy." (The current version of the Corruption Perceptions Index was introduced in 2012.) For comparison with worldwide scores, the best score in 2025 was 89 (ranked 1), the average score was 42, and the worst score was 9 (ranked 181, in a two-way tie)..
