= Dynasty! =

1979 video game

- Developer: Magnavox
- Publishers: NA: Magnavox; PAL: Philips
- Platform: Odyssey²/Videopac
- Release: NA: August 1979; PAL: 1979
- Genre: Board game (Reversi)
- Modes: Single-player, Multi-player

Dynasty!, known in Europe as Videopac 15 - Samurai, is a 1979 video game published by Magnavox and Philips for the Magnavox Odyssey², also known as the Philips Videopac G7000. It is a computer version of the board game reversi, a variant of Othello.

== Gameplay ==
Dynsaty! is a version of reversi which allows players to compete against a computer or another player. Players take turns filling spaces on an 8x8 board with round green or red pieces. Players can capture their opponents pieces by surrounding them on either side. The winning player is the one with the most pieces on the board by the time the board is filled.

This version also allows each player to play with different length timers, allowing one player to handicap themselves. There is also a "Directional Dynasty" in which players only capture pieces in one direction of their choice as opposed to automatically capturing pieces in all directions.

A gameplay screenshot featuring a player playing against a computer.

== Reception ==
Brett Weiss writing in 2011 considered Othello for the Atari 2600 to be more of a challenge but thought the "Directional Dynasty" feature helped set it apart. In a comparison between Dynasty!, Othello for the Atari 2600, and Reversi for the Intellivision, French magazine Tilt considered all three to be too easy and saw them each as unsuitable for experienced reversi players. On the other hand, they thought the "Directional Dynasty" mode was an interesting challenge and kept players on their toes. Electronic Fun with Computers & Games thought the game had fairly good graphics and great playability.
