= The Dynasty (2025 film) =

2025 Hungarian documentary film

The Dynasty (Hungarian: A dinasztia) is a 2025 Hungarian documentary film about the kleptocratic business activities of the family of former Hungarian Prime Minister Viktor Orbán. Released on February 7, 2025 by Direkt36 after almost one year of work, it mainly discusses István Tiborcz, Orbán's son-in-law.

== Synopsis ==
Direkt36, Válasz Online, Telex, and Forbes journalists discuss the enrichment of István Tiborcz, the son-in-law of former Hungarian Prime Minister Viktor Orbán, what the precursors to this were as early as the 1990s, how Orbán and Lajos Simicska played a role in this, and how public procurements that the European Union's inspectors considered to be severely unlawful played a role in this.

In the film, Eva Vajda recounts the so called Fidesz headquarter case, where the party received real estate and sold it immediately to relatives to establish intransparent businesses, and the Kisfaludy tourist development program.

Hungarian-American journalist Bence X. Széchenyi, descendant of Hungarian nobleman and statesman Ferenc Széchényi, secretly recorded his attempt at applying for admission to Tiborcz's elite club, Botaniq Budai Klub, which was opened in 2023. A staff member showed him around, and told him that the club has around 170 members, that the point of the club is that "whatever happens here stays here", and that illegal gambling is taking place. The entrance fee was €4000 and the membership fee was €8000 per year. Széchenyi said that compared to other membership clubs that he visited, the prices here were "ridiculously high". The end of the film shows the reply of the club's owner, where they denied that illegal gambling is taking place, and the reply of Tiborcz, where he said that his success is "mainly due to the fact that I work with a good team of excellent managers with whom we make good business decisions".

== Production ==
The film was produced by Direkt36, which as of 2025 is one of the few investigative journalism teams in Hungary. Direkt36 staff were Kamilla Márton, András Pethő, and Dániel Szőke, together with director Máté Fuchs, co-director Bálint Bíró and other film professionals. The film was released after almost one year of work.

== Reaction ==
Within 24 hours of the film's release, it had received 1 million views, and after a week, it had received 2.7 million views.

Magyar Nemzet, a Hungarian newspaper that styled itself as "close to the current Hungarian government led by Viktor Orbán" wrote that as part of the Ukrainian intelligence operation to discredit Orbán "Direkt36, which calls itself an investigative portal and operates on the Telex platform, has already started to produce a discrediting video." The newspaper asked Direkt36 whether they received Ukrainian support, which they denied multiple times.

Fidesz–KDNP Communications Director Tamás Menczer wrote that "Viktor Orbán will be attacked with Ukrainian money and money from George Soros, according to a briefing of the Hungarian secret services at a meeting of the Parliament's National Security Committee three days ago. Direkt36's film attacking Viktor Orbán is the first element of the Ukrainian state's discrediting campaign." Máté Kocsis, then leader of the Fidesz parliamentary group, accused the press of using Ukrainian money to launch a discrediting campaign against Orbán. Kocsis presented no evidence to this effect, claiming that the secret services had informed the committee, that the Ukrainian state was using Hungarian and foreign journalists to discredit the Hungarian prime minister. Zoltán Sas, the chairman of the committee, stated that Direkt36 was not mentioned.

When Menczer was asked about evidence that the film was created using Ukrainian money, he wrote "I consider the whole film to be discrediting, because you – in accordance with foreign control, to Ferenc Gyurcsány and Péter Brussels [referring to Péter Magyar] – want to give the impression that 'everything is stolen'" and "I base my claim [...] on the statements made by Máté Kocsis."

On February 22, 2025, sheets of paper with the texts "Mafia dynasty" and "Hungarians are the poorest citizens of the European Union" were placed on the window of the baby shop of Tiborcz's wife's and Orbán's daughter, Ráhel Orbán.

Tiborcz said he has not watched the film, which he considers to be a politically motivated smear campaign against him.

When asked about the film, Orbán said he "does not watch this kind of stuff" and he "does not discuss economic matters with anyone".
