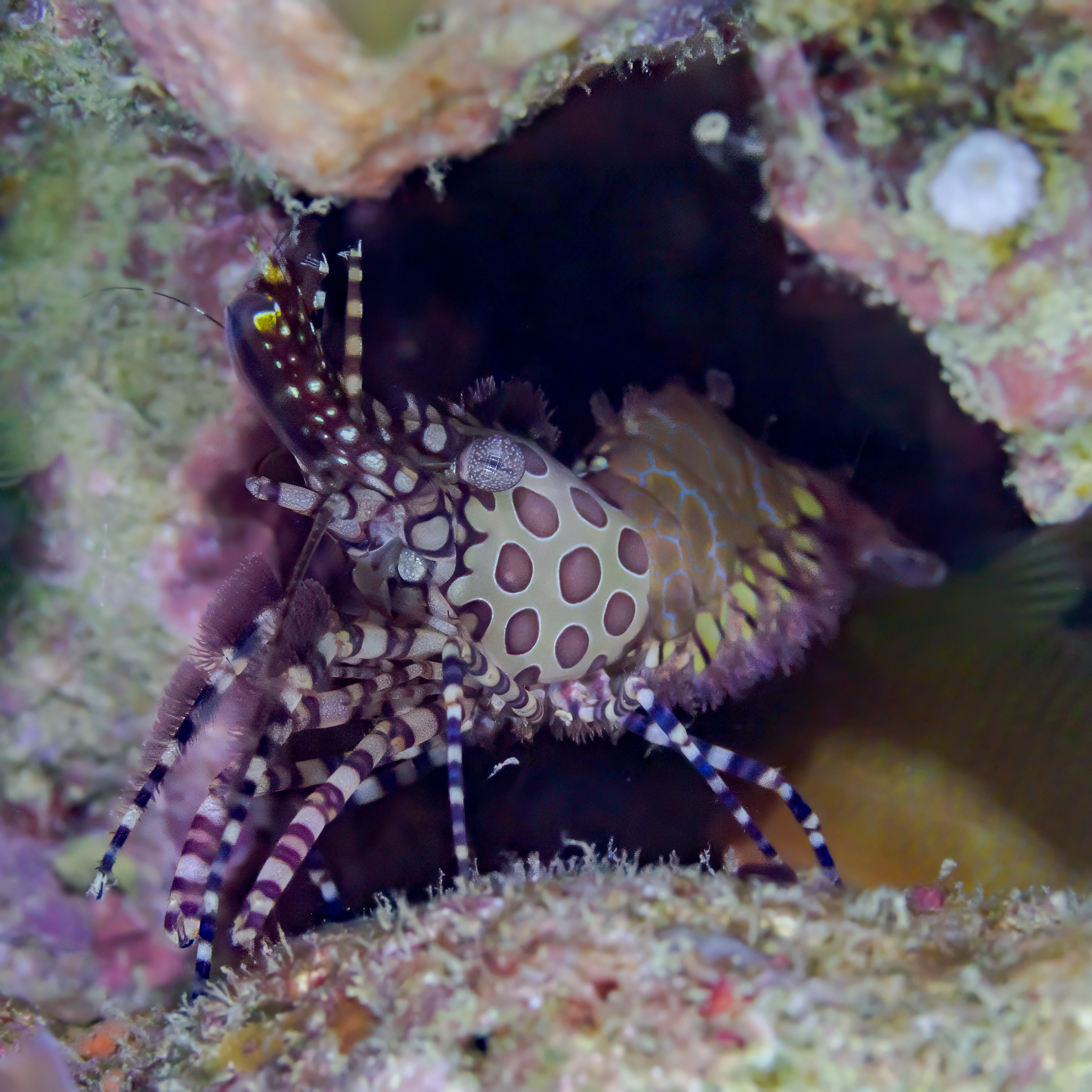

Scientific classification
- Kingdom: Animalia
- Phylum: Arthropoda
- Class: Malacostraca
- Order: Decapoda
- Suborder: Pleocyemata
- Infraorder: Caridea
- Family: Hippolytidae
- Genus: Saron
- Species: S. marmoratus

Binomial name
- Saron marmoratus (Olivier, 1811)

Synonyms
- List: Hippolyte gibberosus H. Milne Edwards, 1837; Hippolyte hemprichii Heller, 1861; Hippolyte leachii Guérin-Méneville, 1838; Hyppolite kraussii Bianconi, 1869; Nauticaris grandirostris Pearson, 1905; Palaemon marmoratus Olivier, 1811

= Saron marmoratus =

Species of crustacean

Saron marmoratus, commonly known as the marbled shrimp, is a species of cleaner shrimp in the family Hippolytidae. It is found in the Indo-Pacific region but in 2013 it was also found off the coast of Lebanon, probably having reached the Mediterranean by Lessepsian migration through the Suez Canal from the Red Sea. It is a popular species in aquaria due to its easy care.

== Description ==
Saron marmoratus is a hunch-backed species of shrimp. Its rostrum is slightly longer than its carapace and is strongly recurved, it has 1 or 2 spines on its dorsal margin, followed by 3 or 4 spines on the carapace, and there are 8-10 long spines on the ventral margin of the carapace. The dorsal margin of the carapace and the abdomen have tufts of setae, which are denser in the females. The males have elongated chaelae which are longer than body and the females possess an obvious brush-like structure of setae on the first pair of legs. The legs feature brown or blue transverse bands. They are variable in colour and the ground colour can be red, blue or brown, mottled with brown or green, the legs are marked with blue or brown transverse bans.

== Distribution ==
Saron marmoratus has an Indo-Pacific distribution. Its distribution extends from the Red Sea south to Madagascar and Mozambique east through the Persian Gulf, India, south east Asia through the southern Pacific, including Australia as far as Hawaii. In 2013 specimens were observed close to underwater caves off the coast of Lebanon, and it is likely that this species has undergone a Lessepsian migration through the Suez Canal from the Red Sea into the Levantine Sea.

== Biology ==
Saron marmoratus is occasionally seen on reefs but it is more frequently found among coral and coral rubble, in the infralittoral to sublittoral zone, within lagoons. It is quite an inactive species which relies on camouflage against the often encrusted substrate. When threatened, it quickly but stealthily swims into a hiding place but, if immediate danger threatens, it can shoot off very quickly and for some distance. It is nocturnal and it can vary the colour of its body so that at night it turns primarily red, camouflaging the shrimp in the twilight.

Saron marmoratus is an omnivore which sifts through the fine substrate at night searching for organic detritus, plankton and other edible items. It has also been known to scavenge on larger food items, such as fish, which fall to the sea bed. It normally does not forage below 12m in depth but it tends to remain close to the reefs. They have also been known to feed on coral and polyps.

== Human use ==
Saron marmoratus is in high demand for the aquarium hobby and fetch good prices in the marine aquarium trade. Specimens on the European market are usually collected from the Red Sea, while those for sale in North America are collected in Hawaii.

== Gallery ==
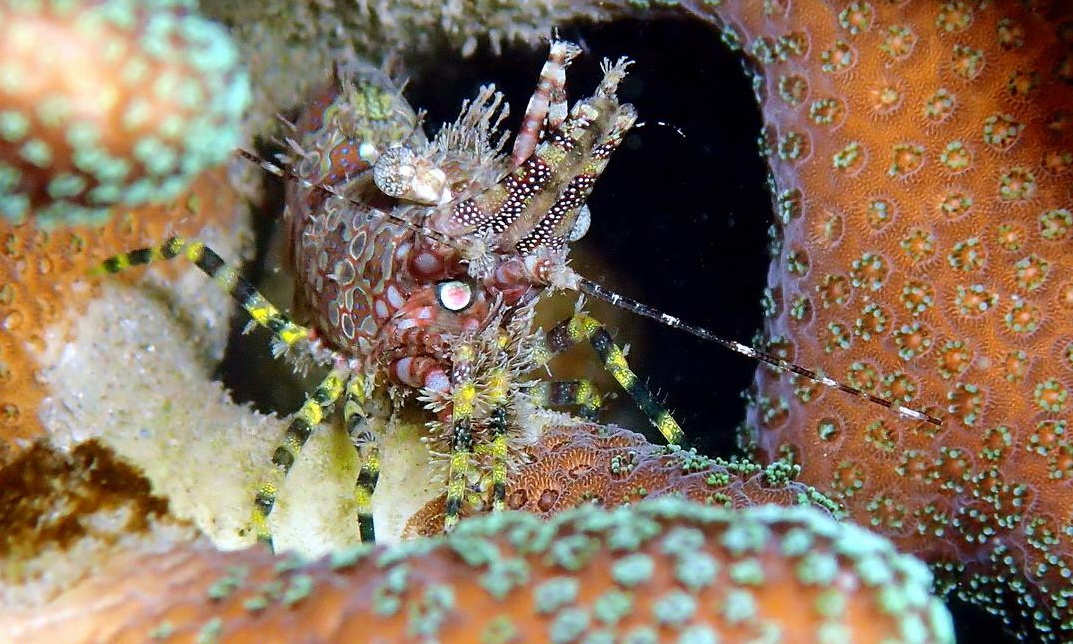
Saron marmoratus

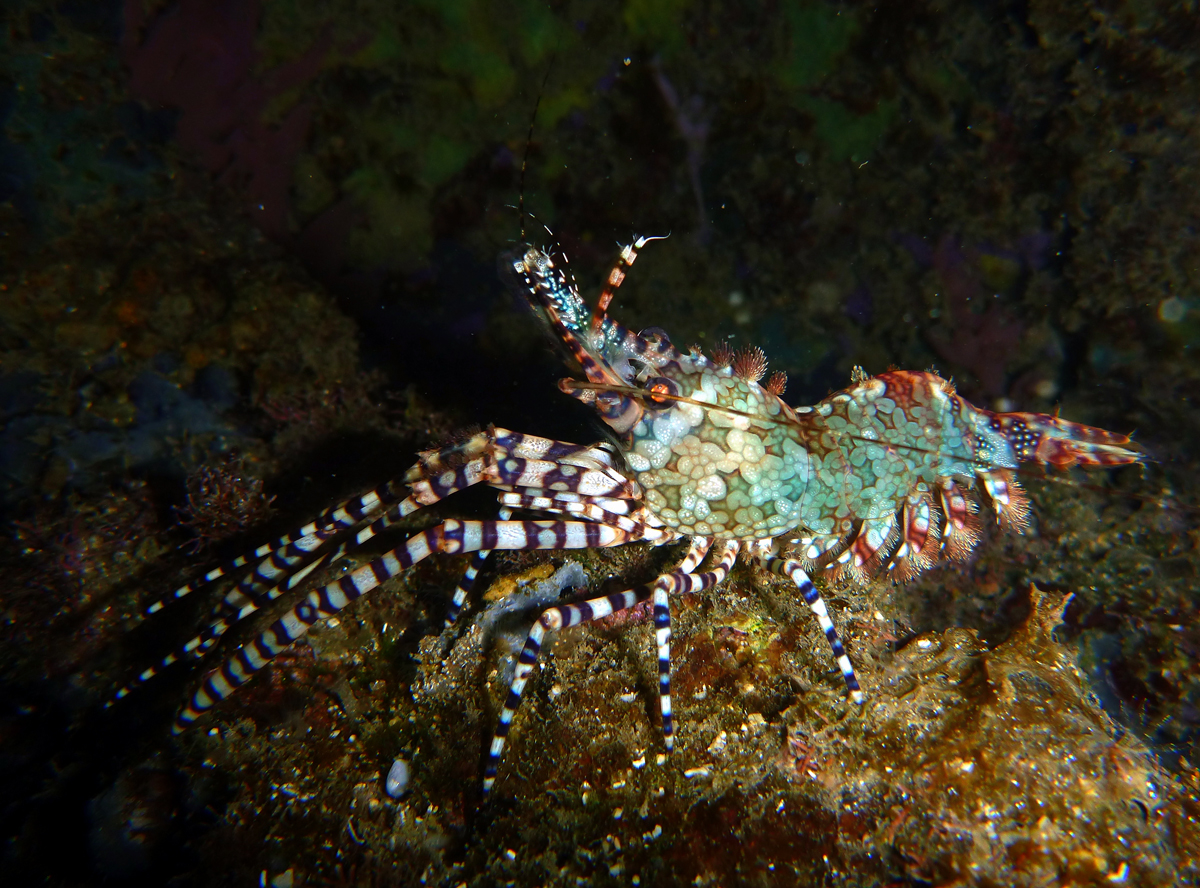
Saron marmoratus mâle - 2

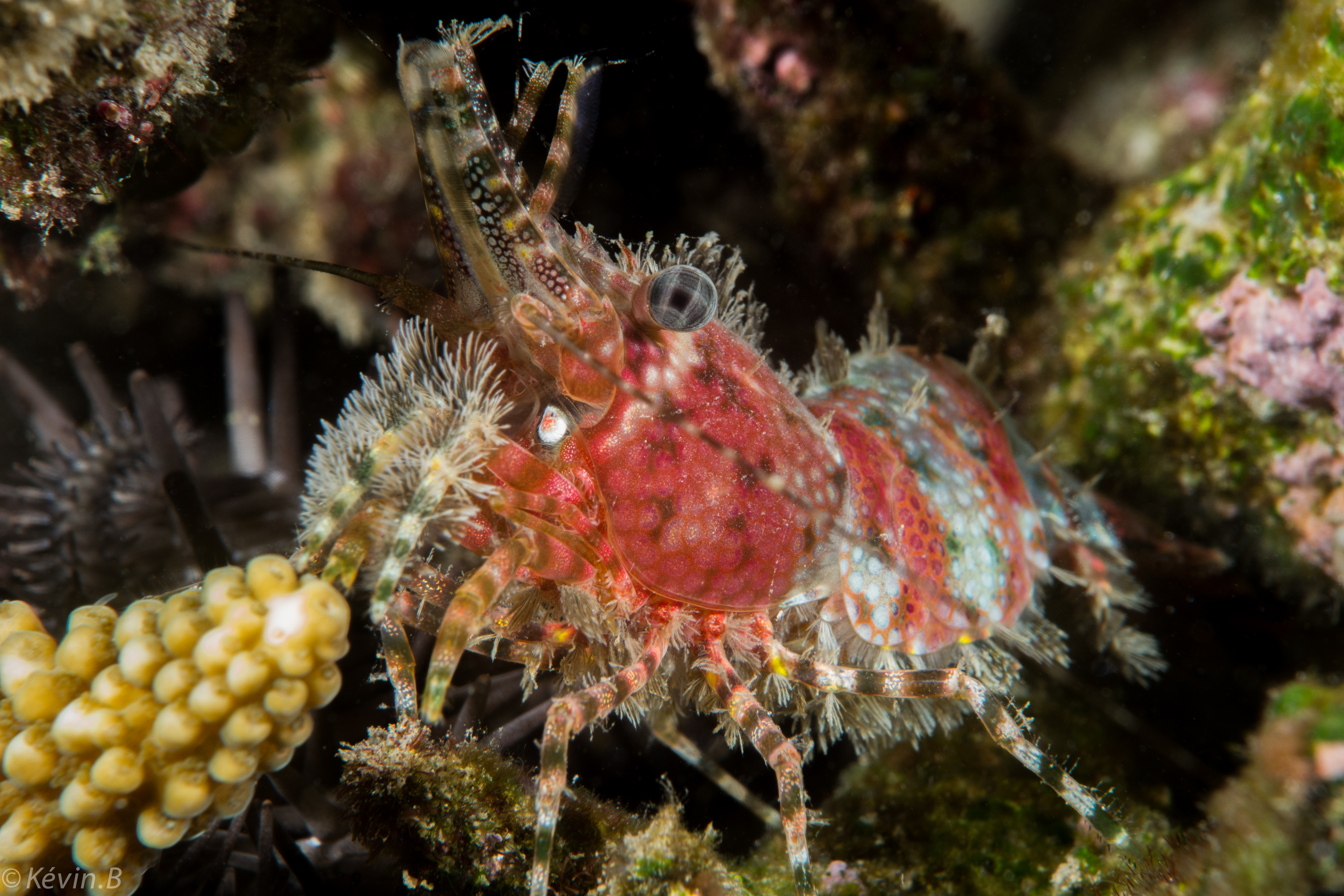
Saron marmoratus, Réunion

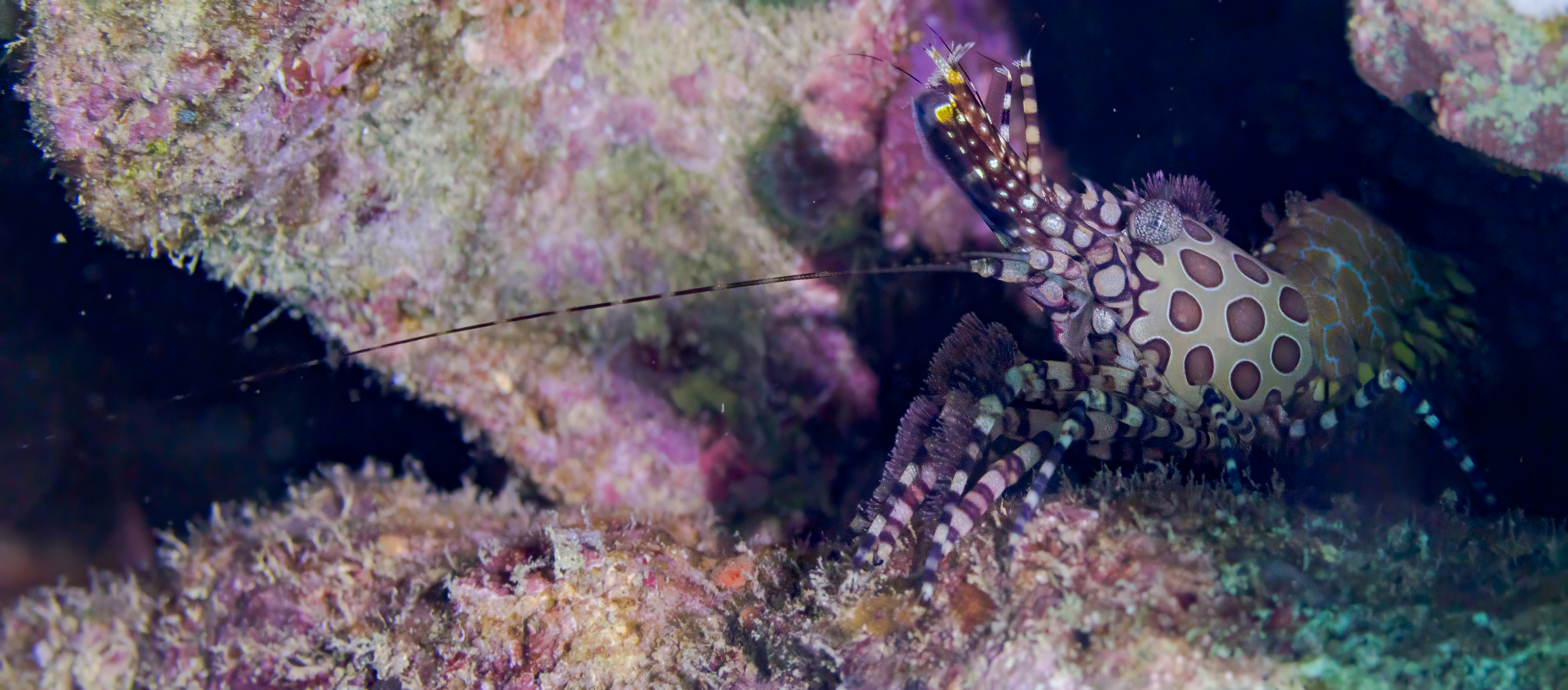
Saron marmoratus, Philippines
