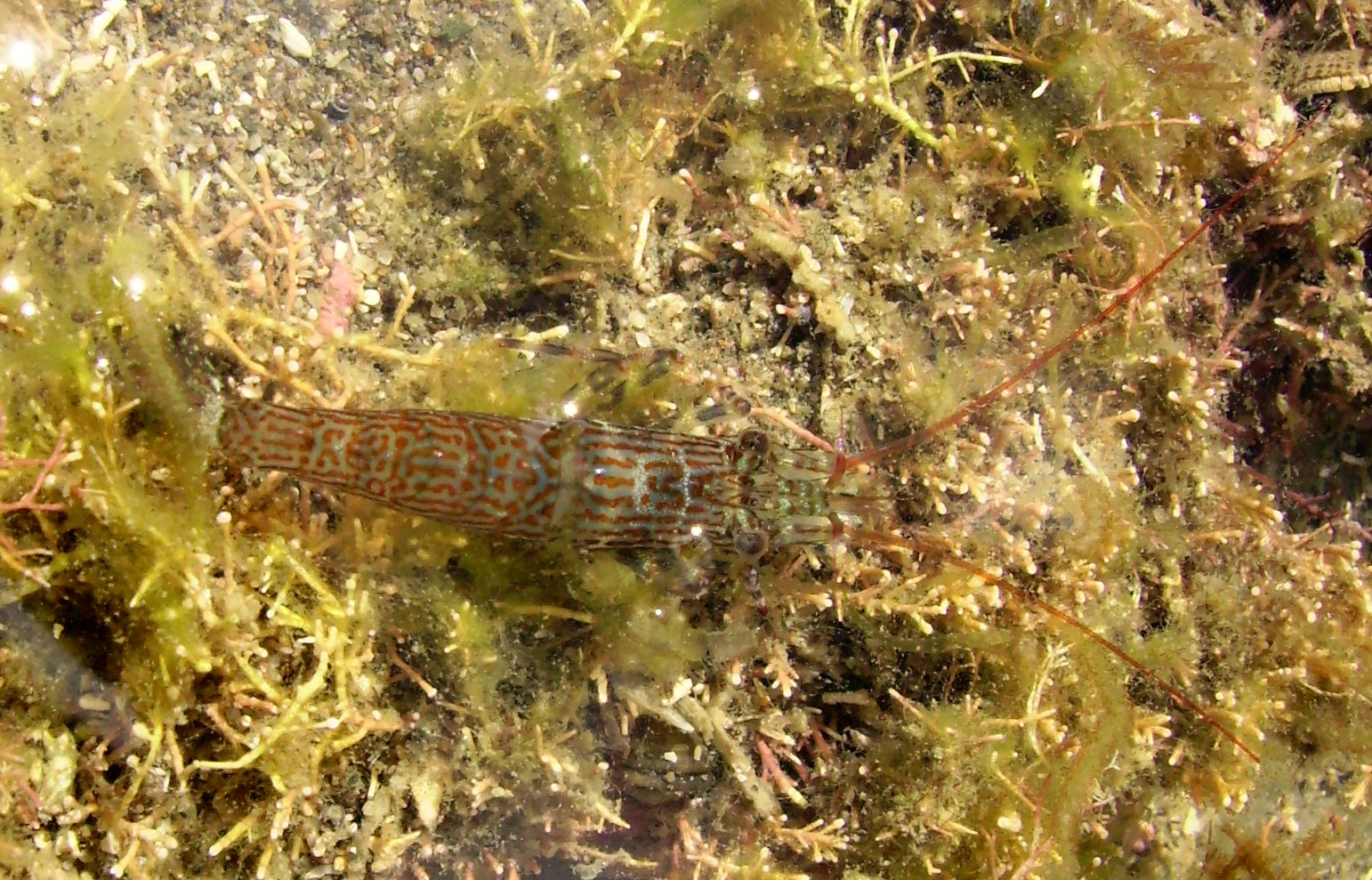

Scientific classification
- Kingdom: Animalia
- Phylum: Arthropoda
- Clade: Pancrustacea
- Class: Malacostraca
- Order: Decapoda
- Suborder: Pleocyemata
- Infraorder: Caridea
- Family: Hippolytidae
- Genus: Alope
- Species: A. spinifrons

Binomial name
- Alope spinifrons (H. Milne-Edwards, 1837)

= Alope spinifrons =

Species of crustacean

Alope spinifrons is a species of shrimp in the family Hippolytidae, the broken-back shrimps. It is widely distributed in New Zealand.
