= Hippolyte californiensis =

Scientific classification
- Kingdom: Animalia
- Phylum: Arthropoda
- Clade: Pancrustacea
- Class: Malacostraca
- Order: Decapoda
- Suborder: Pleocyemata
- Infraorder: Caridea
- Family: Hippolytidae
- Genus: Hippolyte
- Species: H. californiensis

Binomial name
- Hippolyte californiensis Holmes, 1895

Species of crustacean

Hippolyte californiensis, the California green shrimp, is a species of shrimp in the family Hippolytidae. It is native to the eastern Pacific Ocean. It was first described in 1895 by the zoologist S.J. Holmes from Bodega Bay, California. Of the 32 or so species in the genus Hippolyte, it is most closely related to H. obliquimanus and H. williamsi.

== Description ==
Three species of shrimp in the genus Hippolyte are known from the eastern Pacific Ocean. The California green shrimp is a very slender, green glass-like shrimp up to about 20 mm (0.8 in) in length, with females generally being larger than males. The carapace is extended forwards as a long rostrum.

== Distribution ==
The California green shrimp is known from the western coast of North America where it ranges in shallow water from Bodega Bay to the Gulf of California, but is uncommon southwards from Elkhorn Slough. It inhabits calm waters, hiding by day under rocks and in cracks.

== Ecology ==
The California green shrimp is a specialist feeder on the eel grass Zostera marina. It has been shown that it recognises clumps of eel grass visually, preferentially moving towards dark model clumps contrasting with their pale backgrounds. A pattern of vertical stripes in the model is more attractive than a plain-coloured, rectangular object, and a model with narrow stripes is more attractive than one with wide stripes. This shrimp congregates in large numbers at night around eel grass clumps, swimming in and out among the individual blades.

This species engages in rafting, being conveyed across the surface of the sea, carried along on buoyant objects such as floating clumps of seaweed, and this aids in the shrimp's dispersal to new locations.
