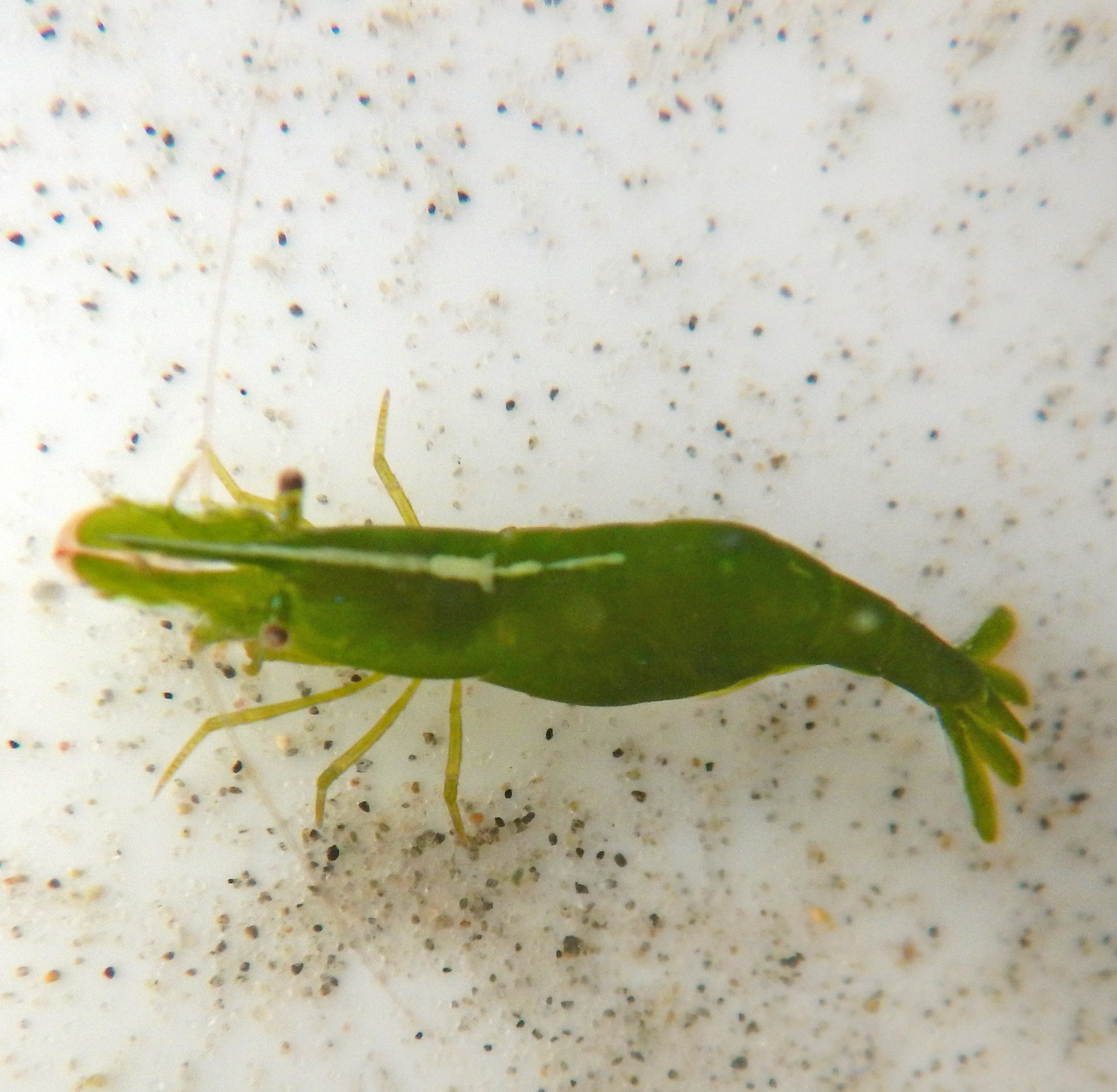

Scientific classification
- Kingdom: Animalia
- Phylum: Arthropoda
- Class: Malacostraca
- Order: Decapoda
- Suborder: Pleocyemata
- Infraorder: Caridea
- Family: Hippolytidae
- Genus: Hippolyte
- Species: H. varians

Binomial name
- Hippolyte varians Leach, 1814

Synonyms
- Hippolyte fascigera Gosse, 1853

= Hippolyte varians =

Species of shrimp

Hippolyte varians, also called the chameleon shrimp, is a species of broken-backed shrimp in the family Hippolytidae.

== Description ==
A prawn/shrimp of up to 3 cm (1.2 in) in length, appearing in many different colours: red, yellow, brown, green, transparent or blue. The colour can adapt to surroundings. During the night it usually becomes bluish-green. The common name "chameleon shrimp" and specific name varians ("varying, fluctuating") both refer to this colour change. It sometimes matches the seaweed on which it feeds, such as the green Ulva lactuca or the red Palmaria palmata.

The short carapace has a single spine. There is also a spine above each eye, and the telson has two pairs of lateral spines.

== Habitat ==
Hippolyte varians is found in waters as deep as 150 m (490 ft) throughout the eastern Atlantic.
