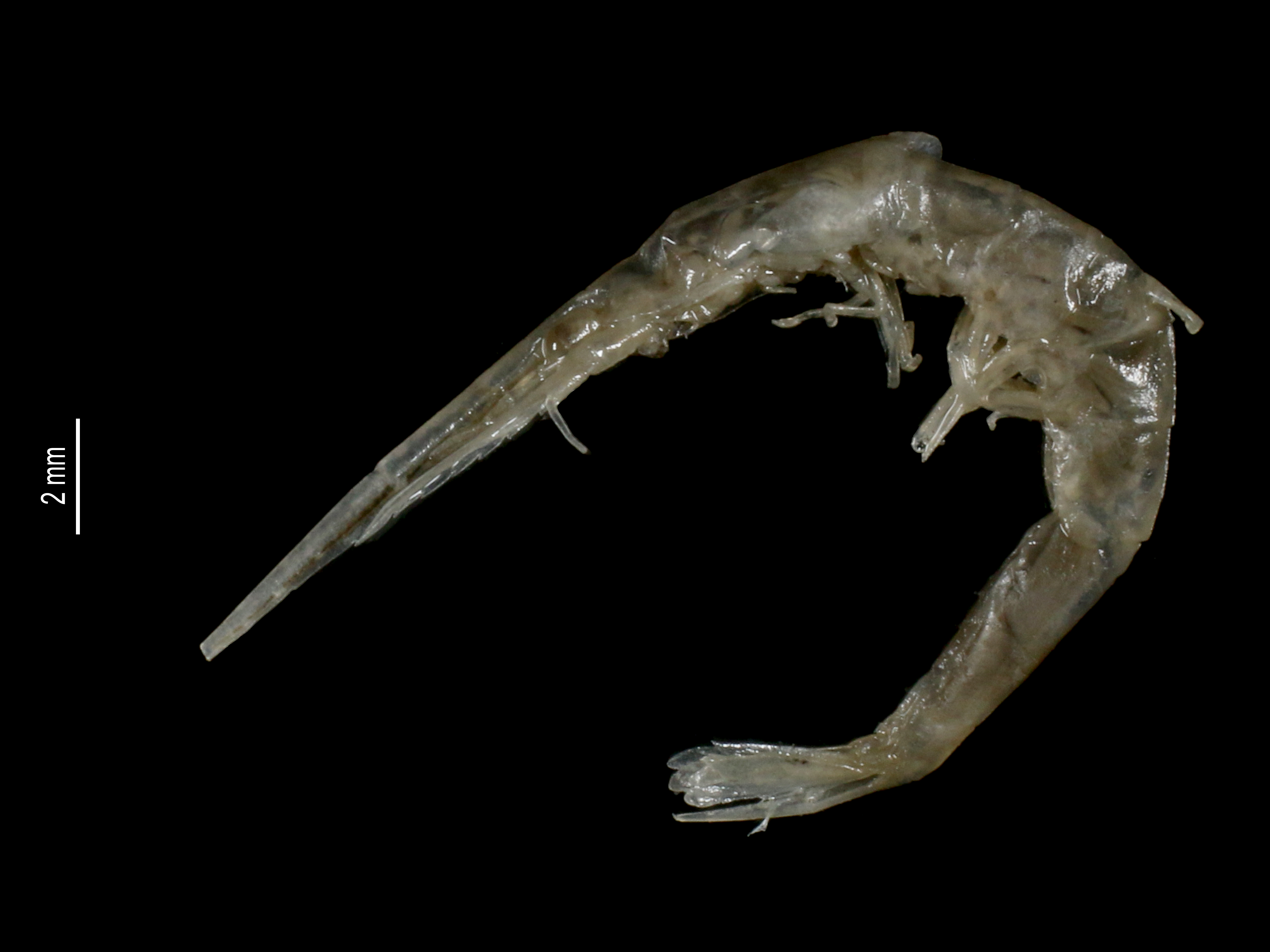

Scientific classification
- Kingdom: Animalia
- Phylum: Arthropoda
- Clade: Pancrustacea
- Class: Malacostraca
- Order: Decapoda
- Suborder: Pleocyemata
- Infraorder: Caridea
- Family: Hippolytidae
- Genus: Tozeuma
- Species: T. cornutum

Binomial name
- Tozeuma cornutum A. Milne-Edwards, 1881

= Tozeuma cornutum =

Species of crustacean

Tozeuma cornutum is a species of shrimp in the family Hippolytidae found throughout the Gulf of Mexico and the Caribbean. The shrimp has a commensal relationship with the soft coral species Antillogorgia americana, similar to other species of caridean shrimp.

== Description ==
Similar to other species in the genus Tozeuma, T. cornutum has an elongated, slender body with an extended rostrum that is 1.1 to 1.3 times longer than its carapace. The rostrum is smooth, with 7 to 11 teeth along the ventral margin. T. cornutum can be distinguished from similar species of Tozeuma in the western Atlantic by a dorsal hook projecting from its third abdominal segment.
