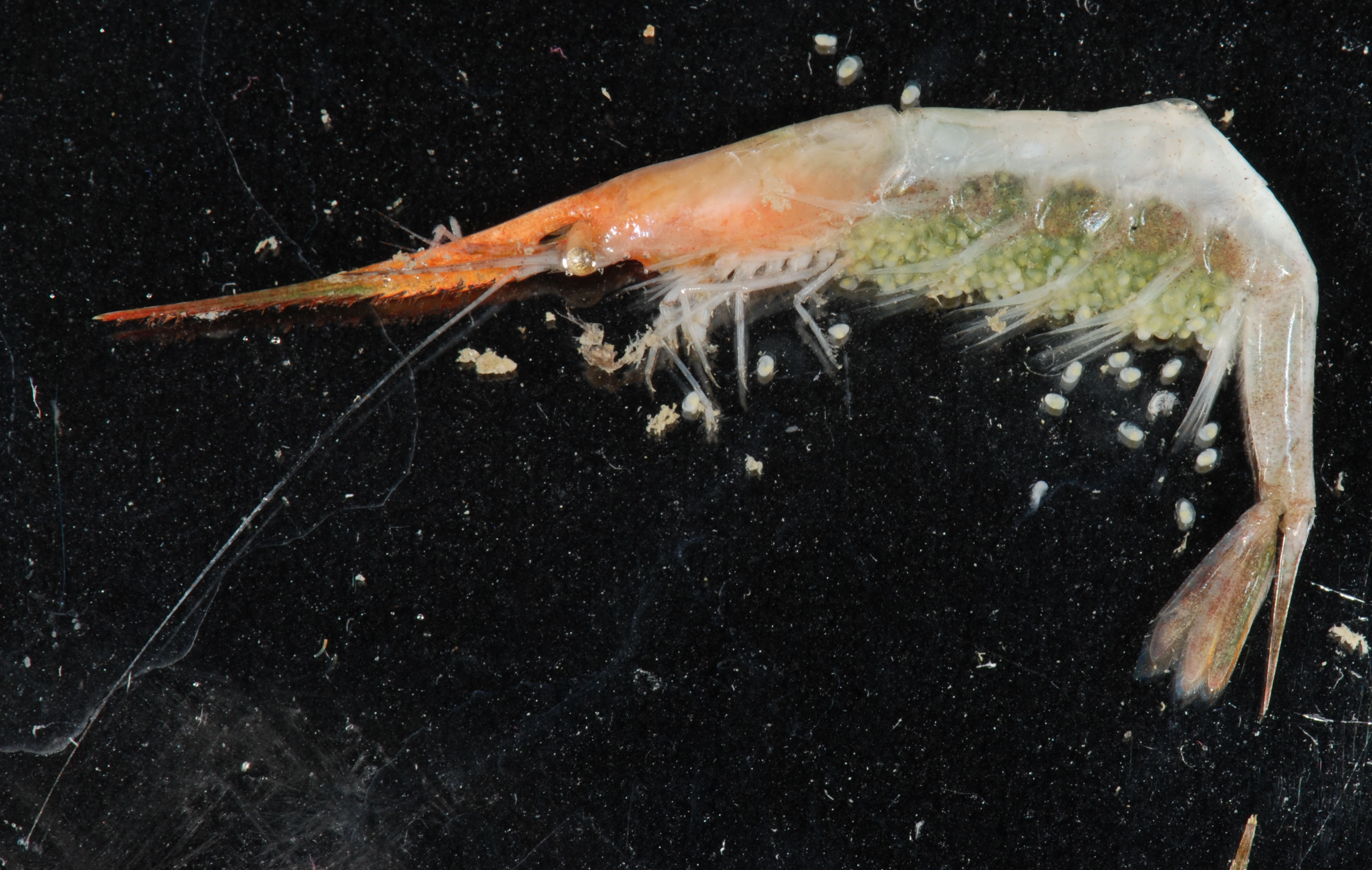

Scientific classification
- Kingdom: Animalia
- Phylum: Arthropoda
- Clade: Pancrustacea
- Class: Malacostraca
- Order: Decapoda
- Suborder: Pleocyemata
- Infraorder: Caridea
- Family: Hippolytidae
- Genus: Tozeuma
- Species: T. carolinense

Binomial name
- Tozeuma carolinense Kingsley, 1878

= Tozeuma carolinense =

Species of crustacean

Tozeuma carolinense, commonly known as the arrow shrimp or the seagrass arrow shrimp, is a species of shrimp in the family Hippolytidae.

== Description ==
T. carolinense has a long slender body that can grow up to 5 cm (2 in) long. Similar to other species in the genus Tozeuma, the rostrum of T. carolinense is long and sharp. The upper surface of the rostrum is smooth, while the lower surface is toothed. The carapace is somewhat translucent and colored green, white, red, brown, or purple.

== Distribution ==
T. carolinense can be found throughout the Gulf of Mexico, the Caribbean Sea, and the East Coast of the United States. However, the shrimp is less common north of Cape Hatteras.

== Ecology ==
T. carolinense is a cryptic species through both form and behavior. The slender body and colorations allow the shrimp to blend with seagrass. When threatened by predators, the shrimp will avoid the predator and align itself with seagrass. Often even when disturbed, the shrimp will remain motionless to continue blending in with the environment.
