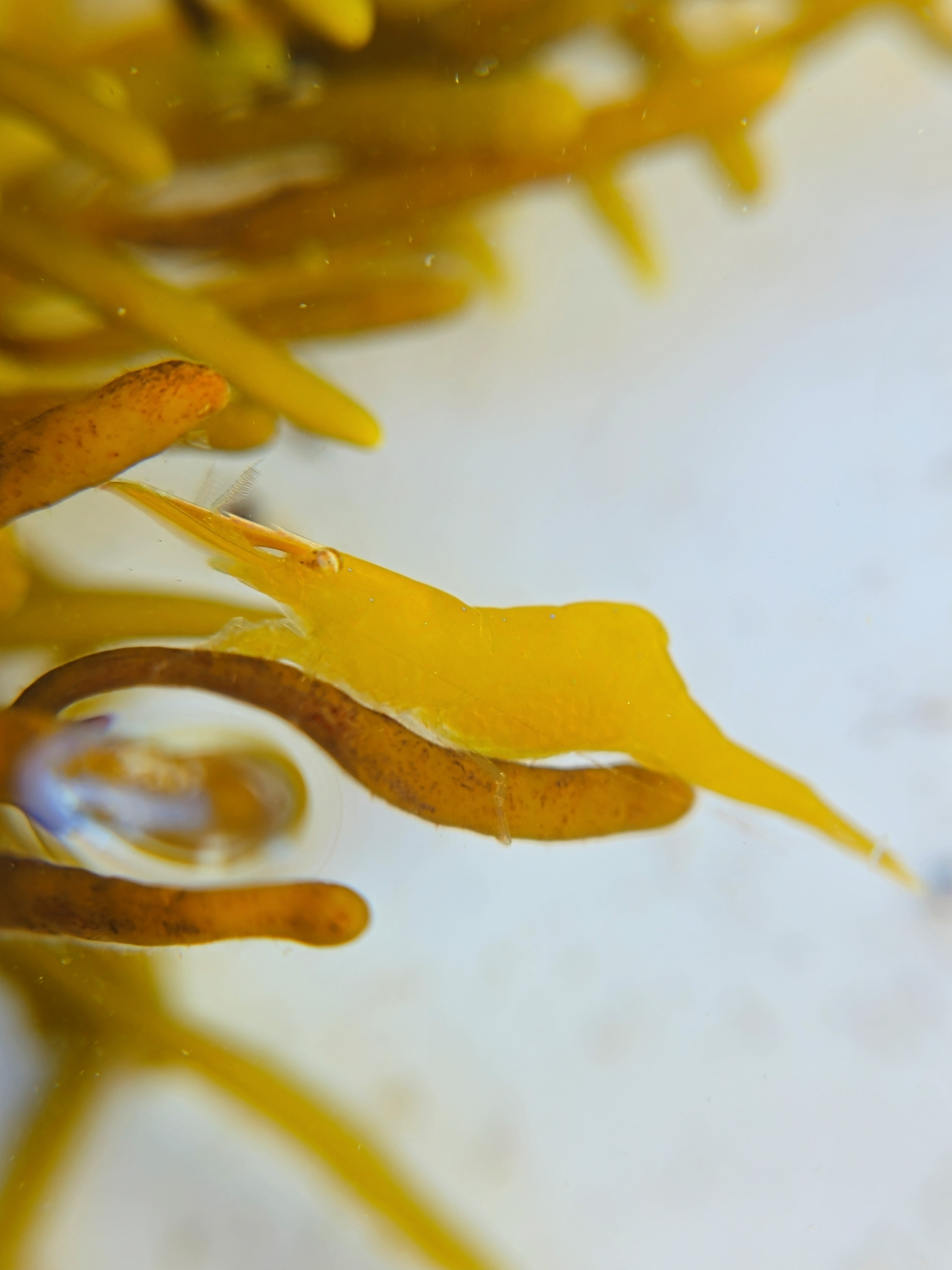

Scientific classification
- Kingdom: Animalia
- Phylum: Arthropoda
- Clade: Pancrustacea
- Class: Malacostraca
- Order: Decapoda
- Suborder: Pleocyemata
- Infraorder: Caridea
- Family: Hippolytidae
- Genus: Hippolyte
- Species: H. bifidirostris

Binomial name
- Hippolyte bifidirostris (E. J. Miers, 1876)

Synonyms
- Virbius bifidirostris E. J. Miers,

= Hippolyte bifidirostris =

Species of crustacean

Hippolyte bifidirostris is a chameleon shrimp of the family Hippolytidae, found around New Zealand at depths of 18–36 metres (59–118 ft). It may also occur on Australia's Great Barrier Reef, but that record may need to be confirmed.
