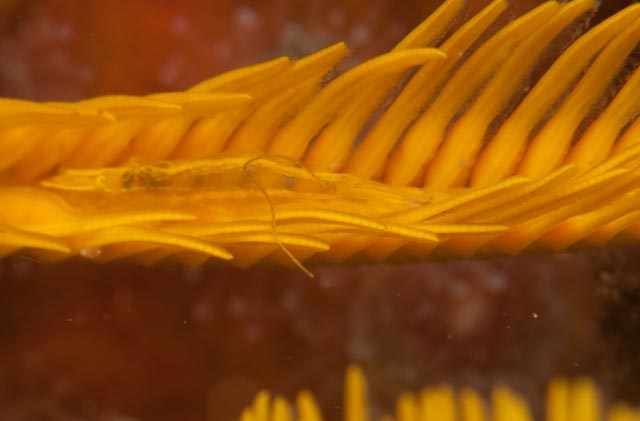

Scientific classification
- Kingdom: Animalia
- Phylum: Arthropoda
- Clade: Pancrustacea
- Class: Malacostraca
- Order: Decapoda
- Suborder: Pleocyemata
- Infraorder: Caridea
- Family: Hippolytidae
- Genus: Hippolyte
- Species: H. catagrapha

Binomial name
- Hippolyte catagrapha d'Udekem d'Acoz, 2007

= Crinoid shrimp =

Species of shrimp

The crinoid shrimp, or feather star shrimp Hippolyte catagrapha, is a species of shrimp in the family Hippolytidae

== Description ==
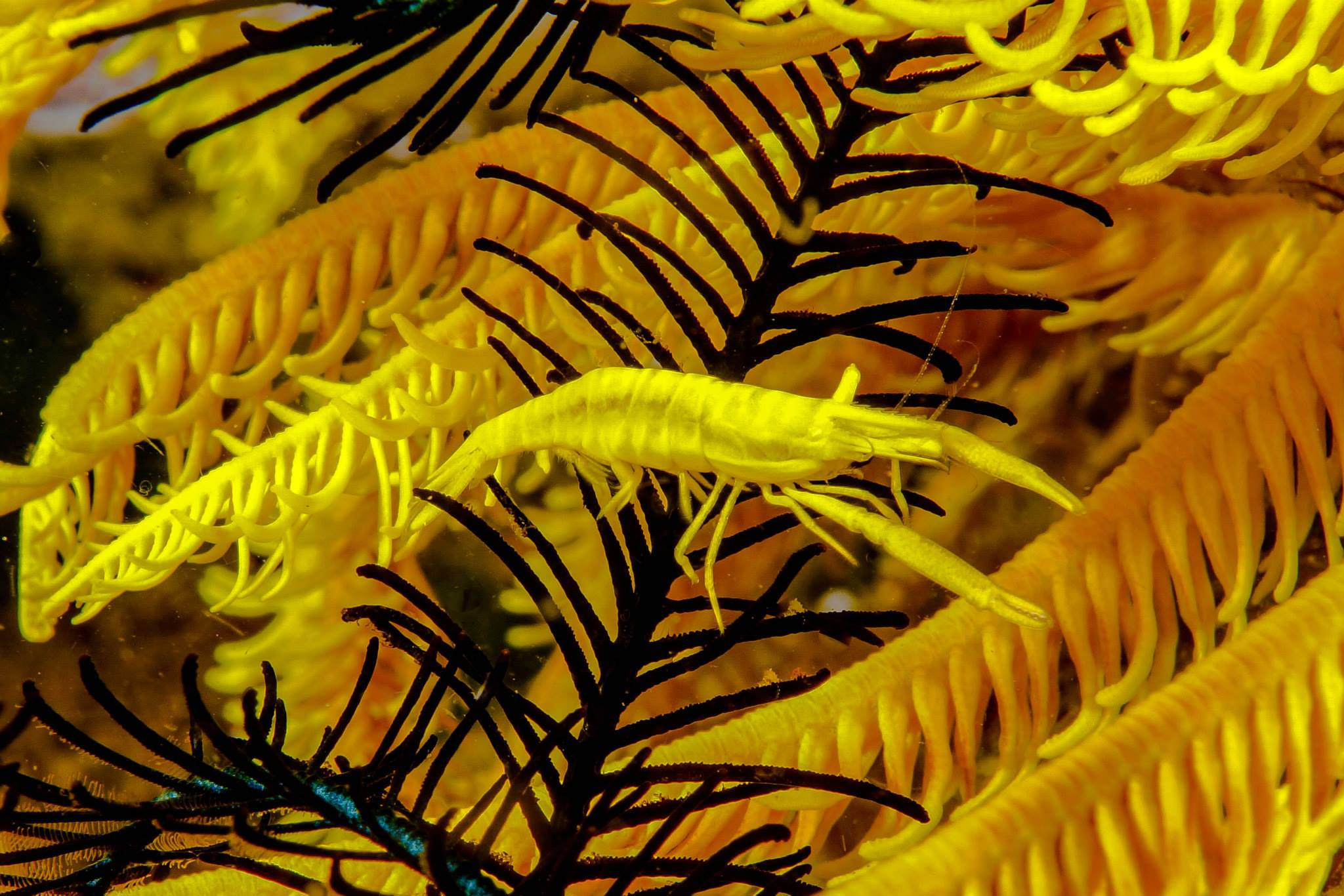
Crinoid Shrimp, Twin Rocks, Anilao, Philippines

Crinoid shrimps grow to up to 3 cm in total length. They are well camouflaged shrimps which live on a host crinoid, the elegant feather star, Tropiometra carinata.

== Distribution ==
These animals are found off the South African coast in False Bay and have been seen from 10 to at least 30 m underwater. They are probably endemic to this area. There is evidence however, that these shrimp exist elsewhere in the world with the species recently observed in the Philippines.

== Ecology ==
These shrimps have so far only been seen in association with crinoids. They probably eat the wastes of their host.
