= Thorella =

Thorella may refer to:

- Thorella (crustacean), a genus of shrimp in the family Hippolytidae
- Thorella, a genus of flowering plants in the family Apiaceae; synonym of Caropsis
