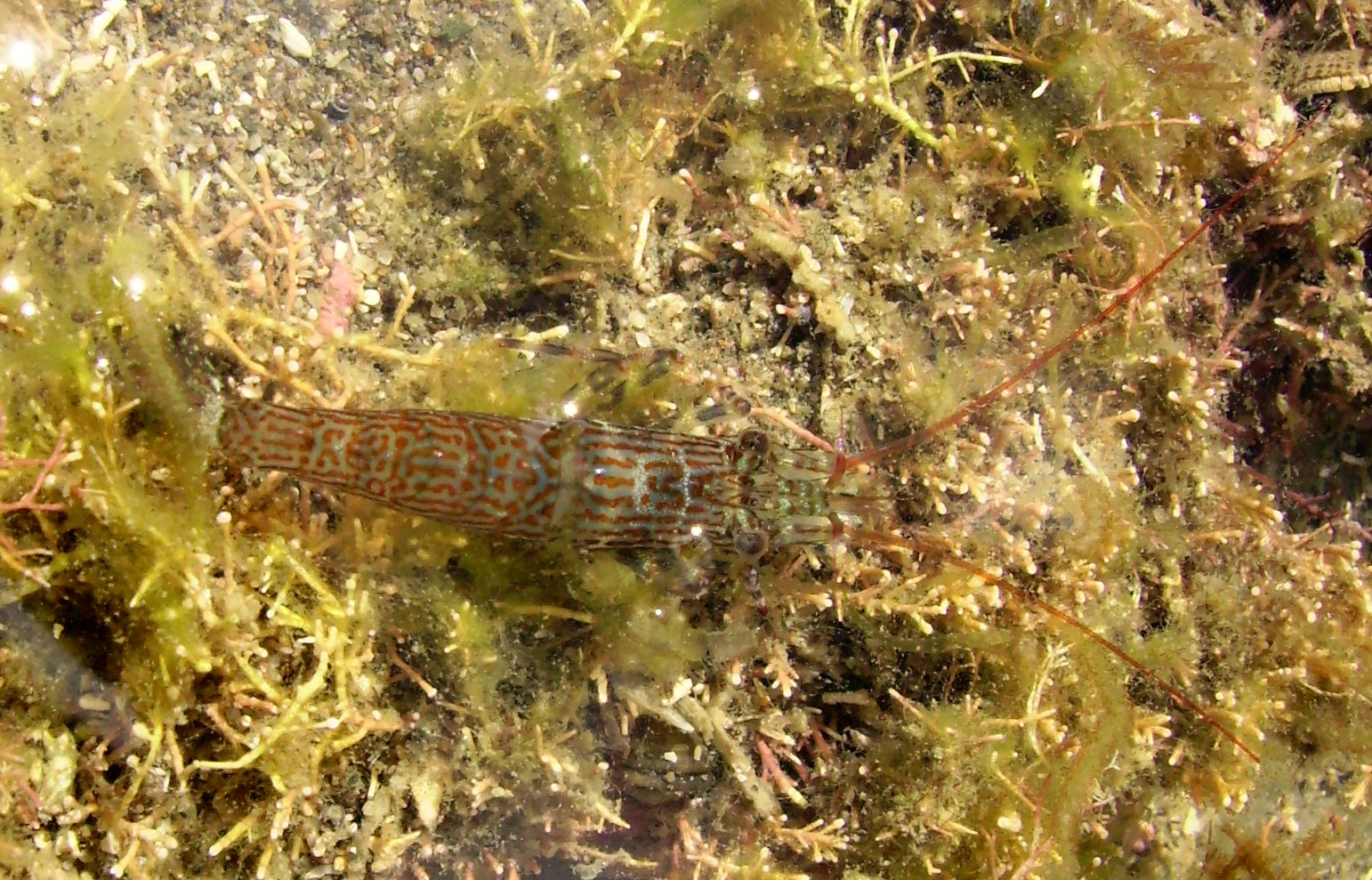
- Alope spinifrons

Scientific classification
- Domain: Eukaryota
- Kingdom: Animalia
- Phylum: Arthropoda
- Class: Malacostraca
- Order: Decapoda
- Suborder: Pleocyemata
- Infraorder: Caridea
- Family: Hippolytidae
- Genus: Alope; White, 1847

Species
- Alope orientalis (De Man, 1906); Alope spinifrons (H. Milne-Edwards, 1837)

= Alope (crustacean) =

Genus of crustaceans

Alope is a genus of shrimp in the family Hippolytidae, comprising two species:

- Alope orientalis is widely distributed across the Indo-West Pacific.
- Alope spinifrons is endemic to New Zealand, and is found throughout that country's coasts.
