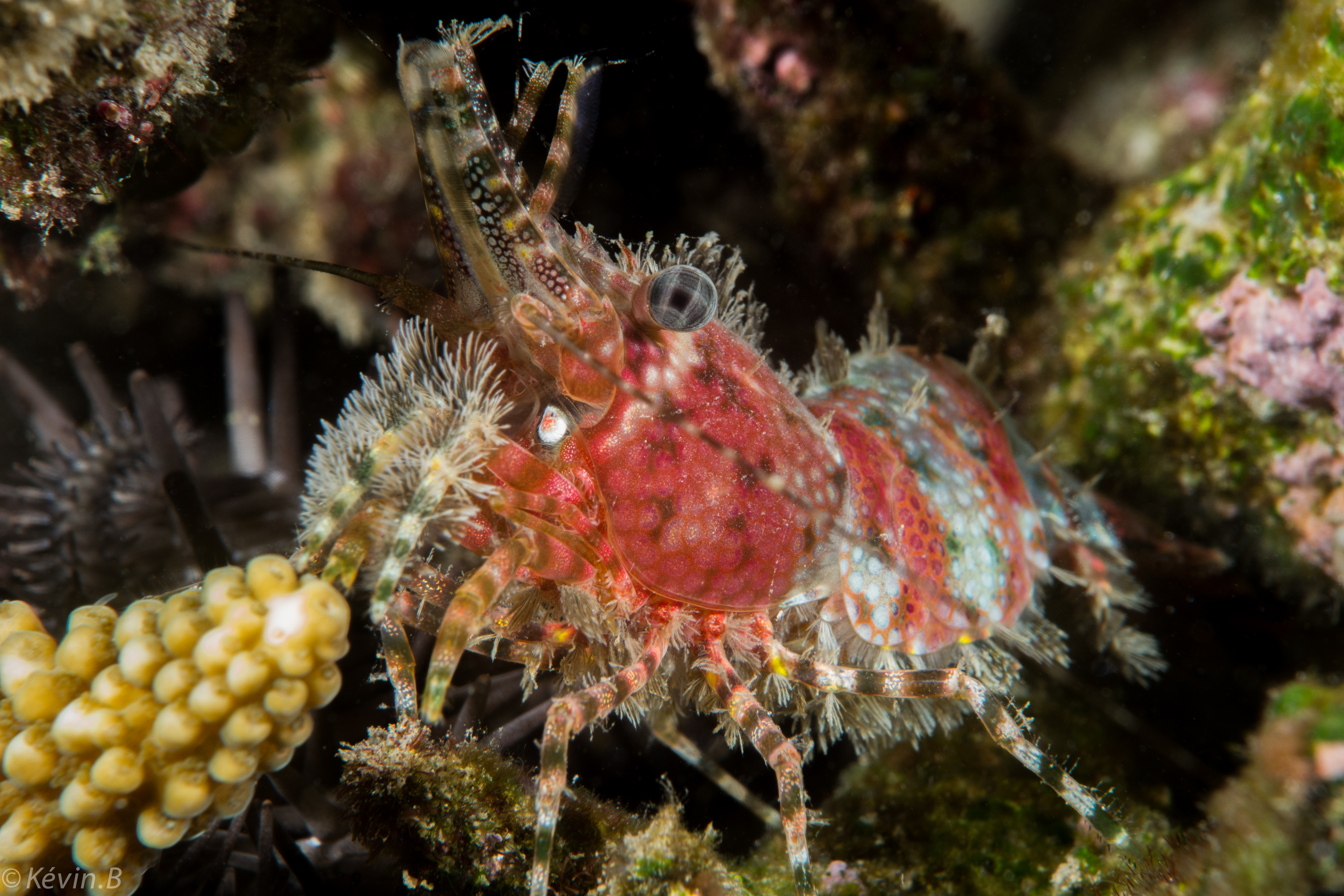
- Saron marmoratus

Scientific classification
- Kingdom: Animalia
- Phylum: Arthropoda
- Clade: Pancrustacea
- Class: Malacostraca
- Order: Decapoda
- Suborder: Pleocyemata
- Infraorder: Caridea
- Family: Hippolytidae
- Genus: Saron; Thallwitz, 1891

Type species
- Hippolyte gibberosus H. Milne Edwards, 1837

= Saron (crustacean) =

Genus of crustaceans

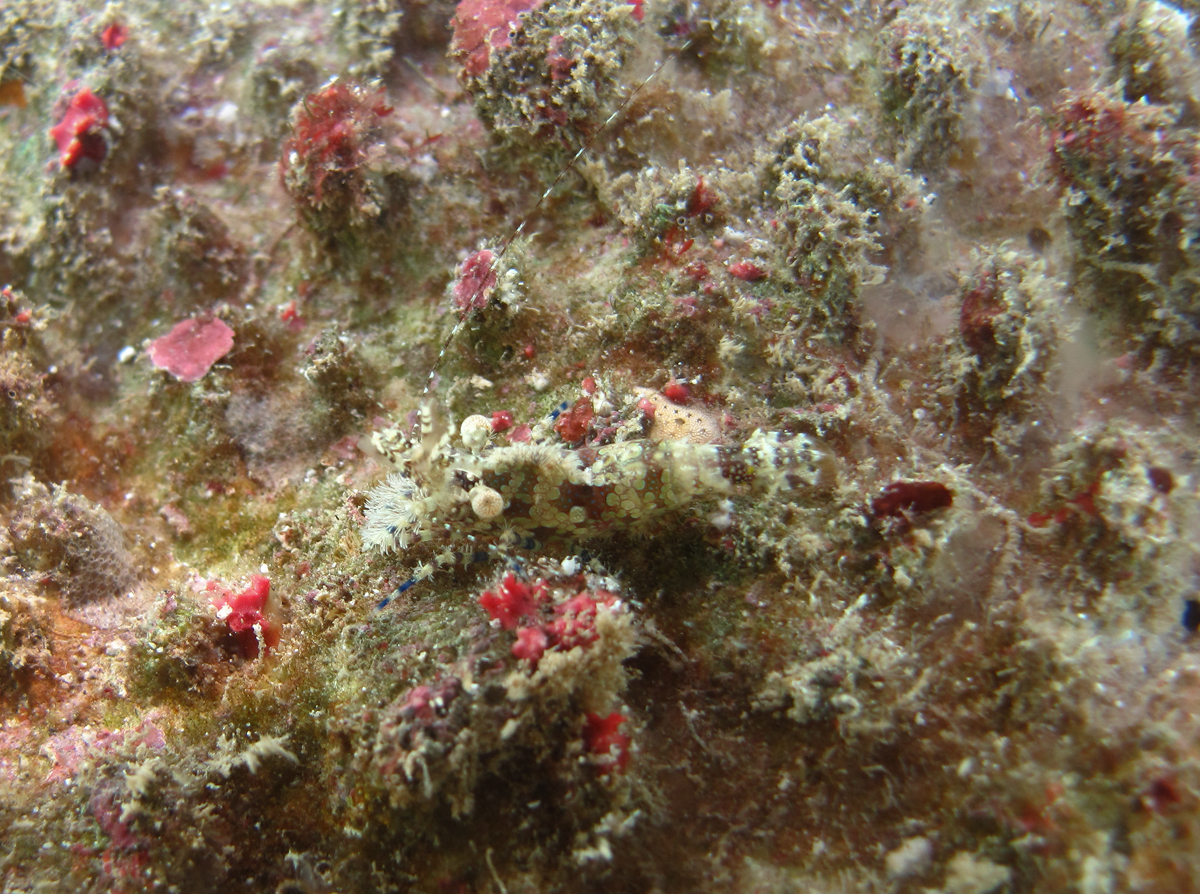
Saron neglectus

Saron is a small genus of caridean prawns in the cleaner shrimp family Hippolytidae, These are common on the reefs of the Indo-Pacific region and it is possible that there may be many more species yet to be described due to the high variability in colour observed. Some species are kept in the marine aquarium trade.

== Species ==
As of 2023, the World Register of Marine Species lists four species in the genus Saron:

- Saron inermis Hayashi in Debelius, 1983
- Saron marmoratus (Olivier, 1811)
- Saron neglectus de Man, 1902
- Saron rectirostris Hayashi, 1984
