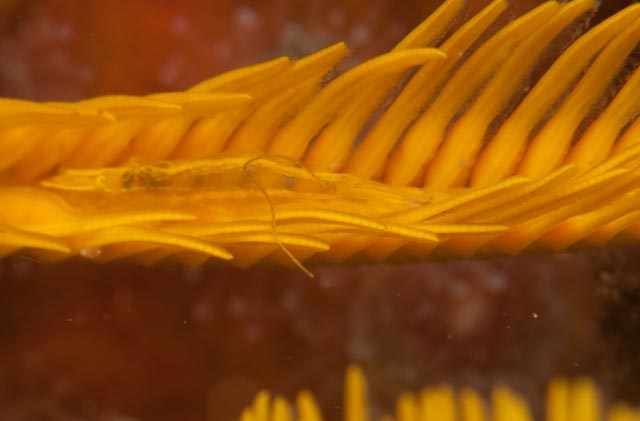
- Hippolyte catagrapha on host crinoid, Tropiometra carinata

Scientific classification
- Kingdom: Animalia
- Phylum: Arthropoda
- Clade: Pancrustacea
- Class: Malacostraca
- Order: Decapoda
- Suborder: Pleocyemata
- Infraorder: Caridea
- Family: Hippolytidae
- Genus: Hippolyte; Leach, 1814

Synonyms
- List: Alcyonohippolyte Marin, Chan & Okuno, 2011; Bellidia Gosse, 1877; Carida Rafinesque, 1814; Hippolite Leach, 1814; Hippolytus Leach, 1814; Hyppolite Leach, 1814; Nectoceras Rafinesque, 1817; Virbius Stimpson, 1860

= Hippolyte (crustacean) =

Genus of crustaceans

Hippolyte is a genus of shrimp in the family Hippolytidae, containing the following species:

- Hippolyte acuta (Stimpson, 1860)
- Hippolyte australiensis (Stimpson, 1860)
- Hippolyte bifidirostris (Miers, 1876)
- Hippolyte californiensis Holmes, 1895
- Hippolyte caradina Holthuis, 1947
- Hippolyte catagrapha d'Udekem d'Acoz, 2007
- Hippolyte cedrici Fransen & De Grave, 2019
- Hippolyte chacei Gan & X Li, 2019
- Hippolyte clarki Chace, 1951
- Hippolyte coerulescens (Fabricius, 1775)
- Hippolyte commensalis Kemp, 1925
- Hippolyte dossena (Marin, Okuno & Chan, 2011)
- Hippolyte edmondsoni Hayashi, 1981
- Hippolyte garciarasoi d'Udekem d'Acoz, 1996
- Hippolyte holthuisi Zariquiey Álvarez, 1953
- Hippolyte inermis Leach, 1816
- Hippolyte jarvinensis Hayashi, 1981
- Hippolyte karenae Fransen & De Grave, 2019
- Hippolyte kraussiana (Stimpson, 1860)
- Hippolyte lagarderei d'Udekem d'Acoz, 1995
- Hippolyte leptocerus (Heller, 1863)
- Hippolyte leptometrae Ledoyer, 1969
- Hippolyte longiallex d'Udekem d'Acoz, 2007
- Hippolyte multicolorata Yaldwyn, 1971
- Hippolyte nanhaiensis Gan & X Li, 2019
- Hippolyte ngi Gan & X Li, 2017
- Hippolyte nicholsoni Chace, 1972
- Hippolyte niezabitowskii d'Udekem d'Acoz, 1996
- Hippolyte obliquimanus Dana, 1852
- Hippolyte orientalis Heller, 1861
- Hippolyte palliola Kensley, 1970
- Hippolyte pleuracantha (Stimpson, 1871)
- Hippolyte prideauxiana Leach, 1817
- Hippolyte proteus (Paulson, 1875)
- Hippolyte sapphica d'Udekem d'Acoz, 1993
- Hippolyte singaporensis Gan & X Li, 2017
- Hippolyte varians Leach, 1814
- Hippolyte ventricosa H. Milne Edwards, 1837
- Hippolyte williamsi Schmitt, 1924
- Hippolyte zostericola (Smith, 1873)
