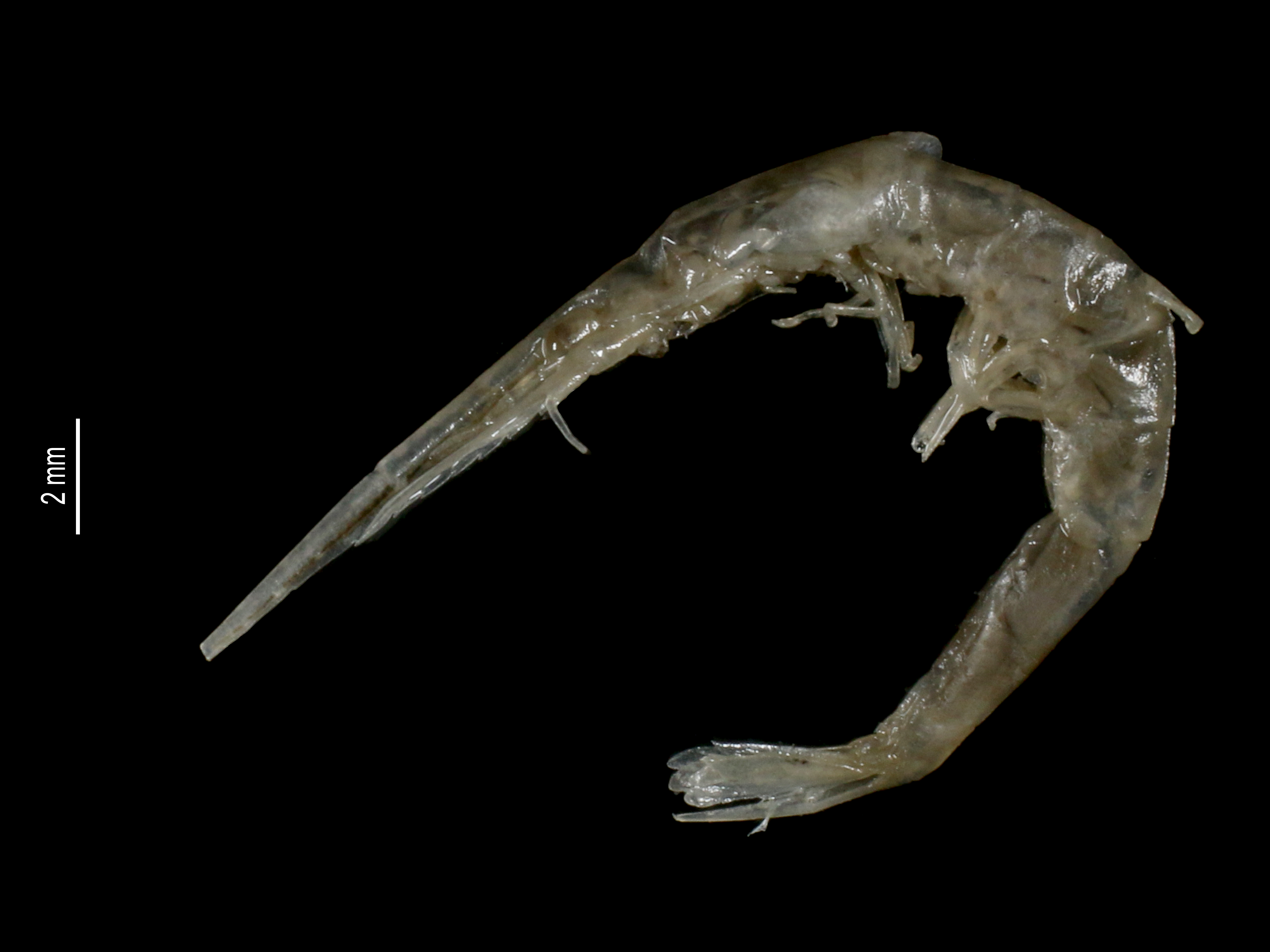
- Tozeuma cornutum

Scientific classification
- Kingdom: Animalia
- Phylum: Arthropoda
- Clade: Pancrustacea
- Class: Malacostraca
- Order: Decapoda
- Suborder: Pleocyemata
- Infraorder: Caridea
- Family: Hippolytidae
- Genus: Tozeuma; Stimpson, 1860

Type species
- Tozeuma lanceolatum Stimpson, 1860

= Tozeuma =

Genus of caridean prawns

Tozeuma is a genus of caridean prawns in the cleaner shrimp family Hippolytidae. The genus has a global distribution in temperate and tropical marine and estuarine environments.

The World Register of Marine Species lists 11 species in the genus Tozeuma:

- Tozeuma armatum Paulson, 1875
- Tozeuma carolinense Kingsley, 1878
- Tozeuma cornutum A. Milne-Edwards, 1881
- Tozeuma elongata Baker, 1904
- Tozeuma erythraeum Nobili, 1904
- Tozeuma kimberi Baker, 1904
- Tozeuma lanceolatum Stimpson, 1860
- Tozeuma novaezealandiae Borradaile, 1916
- Tozeuma pavoninum Spence Bate, 1864
- Tozeuma serratum A. Milne-Edwards, 1881
- Tozeuma tomentosum Baker, 1904

== Etymology ==
When Stimpson originally named the genus, he incorrectly translated the Greek word for "arrow", Toxeuma, as Tozeuma. However, Toxeuma was already the name for a genus of wasp in the Pteromalidae family, so it would have been invalid if spelled correctly.
