= Thorella cobourgi =

Scientific classification
- Domain: Eukaryota
- Kingdom: Animalia
- Phylum: Arthropoda
- Class: Malacostraca
- Order: Decapoda
- Suborder: Pleocyemata
- Infraorder: Caridea
- Family: Hippolytidae
- Genus: Thorella; Bruce, 1982
- Species: T. cobourgi

Binomial name
- Thorella cobourgi Bruce, 1982

Genus of crustaceans

Thorella cobourgi is a species of shrimp in the family Hippolytidae. It is found in south-eastern Asia and Australia and is the only species in the monotypic genus Thorella.
