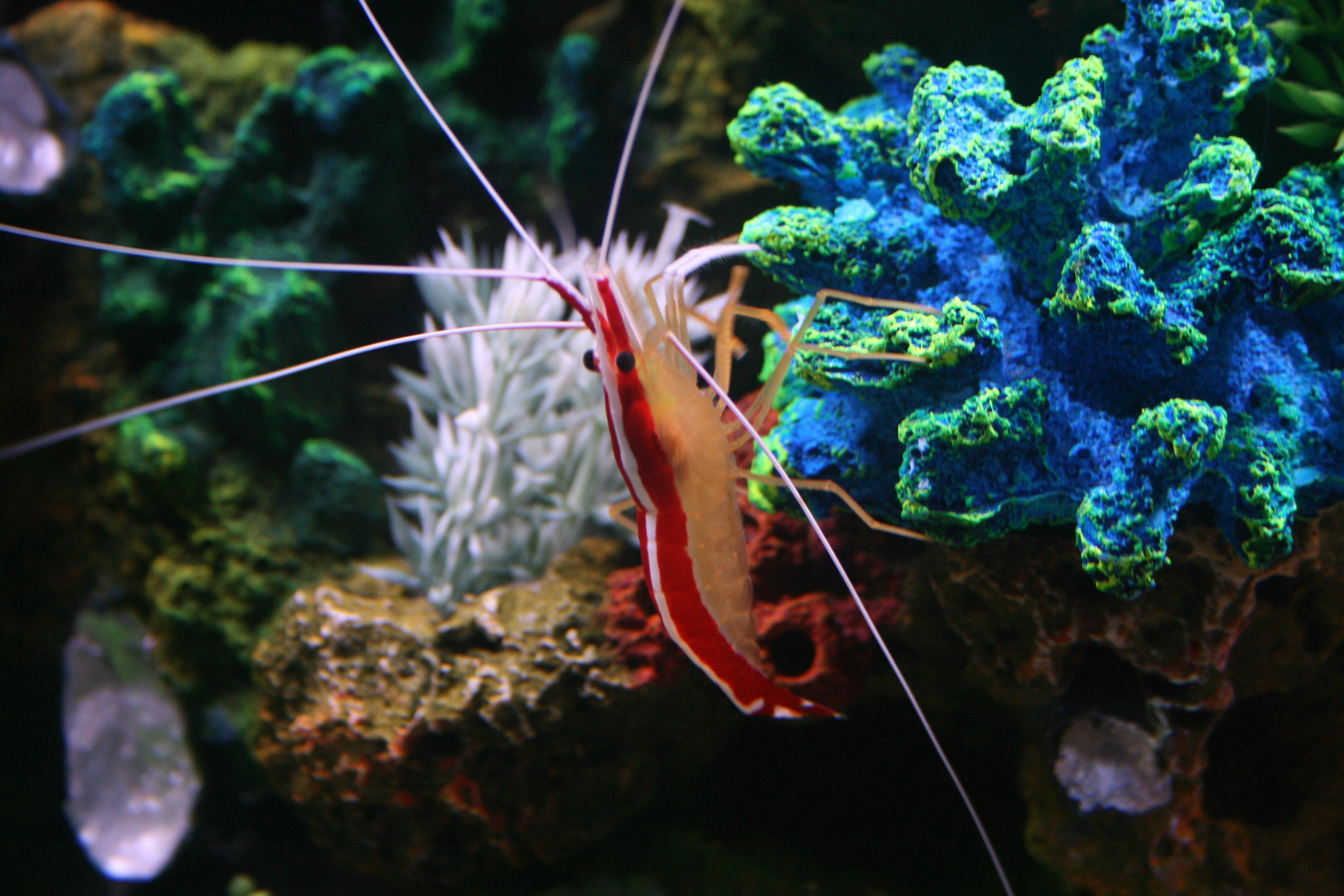
- Lysmata amboinensis

Scientific classification
- Kingdom: Animalia
- Phylum: Arthropoda
- Clade: Pancrustacea
- Class: Malacostraca
- Order: Decapoda
- Suborder: Pleocyemata
- Infraorder: Caridea
- Superfamily: Alpheoidea
- Family: Hippolytidae; Spence Bate, 1888

= Hippolytidae =

Family of crustaceans

Hippolytidae is a family of cleaner shrimp, also known as broken-back shrimp or anemone shrimp. The term "broken-back shrimp" also applies to the genus Hippolyte in particular and "cleaner shrimp" is sometimes applied exclusively to Lysmata amboinensis.

== Taxonomy ==
Formerly, the circumscription of the family Hippolytidae included several additional taxa that have now been transferred to Bythocariidae, Lysmatidae, Merguiidae, and Thoridae. As of June, 2023, there are 16 genera recognised in the family Hippolytidae sensu stricto:

- Alope White, 1847
- Caridion Goës, 1864
- Chorismus Spence Bate, 1888
- Eumanningia Crosnier, 2000
- Gelastocaris Kemp, 1914
- Gelastreutes AJ Bruce, 1990
- Hippolyte Leach, 1814
- Latreutes Stimpson, 1860
- Leontocaris Stebbing, 1905
- Merhippolyte Spence Bate, 1888
- Nauticaris Spence Bate, 1888
- Phycocaris Kemp, 1916
- Saron Thallwitz, 1891
- Thorella Bruce, 1982
- Tozeuma Stimpson, 1860
- Trachycaris Calman, 1906
