= Rivière au Doré Ouest =

Location
- Country: Canada
- Province: Quebec
- Region: Saguenay–Lac-Saint-Jean
- Regional County Municipality: Le Domaine-du-Roy Regional County Municipality

Physical characteristics
- Source: Little lake
  - location: La Doré
  - coordinates: 48°42′49″N 72°47′07″W
  - elevation: 290 m (950 ft)
- Mouth: Ditton River
  - location: La Doré
  - coordinates: 48°42′56″N 72°37′28″W
  - elevation: 160 m (520 ft)
- Length: 16.9 km (10.5 mi)

Basin features
- Progression: Rivière aux Saumons (Ashuapmushuan River), Ashuapmushuan River, Lac Saint-Jean, Saguenay River, Saint Lawrence River

The rivière au Doré Ouest (English: Doré West River) is a tributary of rivière au Doré, flowing in the municipality of La Doré, in the Le Domaine-du-Roy Regional County Municipality, in the administrative region of Saguenay–Lac-Saint-Jean, in the province of Quebec, in Canada.

The Doré Ouest river valley is mainly served by a few forest roads, the chemin de la shop, the chemin du lac Rond and the rue des Peupliers (route 167).

Forestry (mainly forestry) is the main economic activity in the upper part of this valley; agriculture, in the middle and lower part.

== Geography ==
The rivière au Doré Ouest originates at the mouth of a small lake (length: 1.0 km (0.62 mi); altitude: 290 m (950 ft)) in a forest area in the municipality of La Doré. This source is located at:

- 1.9 km (1.2 mi) south-east of a curve in the course of the Rivière aux Trembles;
- 10.0 km (6.2 mi) south-west of the village center of La Doré;
- 26.0 km (16.2 mi) west of downtown Saint-Félicien;
- 11.8 km (7.3 mi) south-west of the mouth of the river at Doré Ouest.

From its source, the rivière au Doré Ouest flows over 16.9 km (10.5 mi) with a drop of 130 m (430 ft), especially in the agricultural and village areas at the end of the route, according to following segments:

- 4.6 km (2.9 mi) southeasterly in a straight line, to the outlet (coming from the south) of three lakes, including Lac Doré;
- 7.2 km (4.5 mi) towards the north-east by forming a large loop towards the south to bypass a mountain, then towards the east at the end of the segment, until the discharge (coming from the south-east) several lakes;
- 4.3 km (2.7 mi) north across a small lake (length: 0.26 km (0.16 mi); altitude: 181 m (594 ft)), then forming a large curve towards the west by winding in places and collecting a stream (coming from the west), up to the outlet (coming from the south) of two lakes including Lac Jos-Gagnon;
- 0.8 km (0.50 mi) towards the northeast by crossing the chemin du lac Rond, up to rue des Peupliers (route 167, which the river cuts at 0.7 km (0.43 mi) north-west of the center of the village La Doré;
- 3.0 km (1.9 mi) towards the east by forming a big curve towards the north in agricultural area to bypass the village La Doré and by collecting two streams (coming from the south), until its mouthpiece.

The "rivière au Doré" river flows on the south bank of the rivière au Doré. This confluence is located at:

- 1.9 km (1.2 mi) north-east of the center of the village of La Doré;
- 15.0 km (9.3 mi) west of downtown Saint-Félicien;
- 24.2 km (15.0 mi) west of the mouth of the Ashuapmushuan River;
- 36.9 km (22.9 mi) northwest of downtown Roberval.

From the mouth of the West Doré river, the current descends the course of the rivière au Doré over 4.4 km (2.7 mi), the course of the rivière aux Saumons on 8.2 km (5.1 mi), the course of the Ashuapmushuan river towards the southeast on 18 km (11 mi), then crosses Lac Saint-Jean towards is on 41.1 km (25.5 mi) (ie its full length), follows the course of the Saguenay river via the Petite Décharge on 172.3 km (107.1 mi) eastwards to Tadoussac where it merges with the estuary of Saint Lawrence.

== Toponymy ==
The term "Doré" refers to a species of fish.

The toponym "Rivière au Doré Ouest" was formalized on December 5, 1968, at the Place Names Bank of the Commission de toponymie du Québec.

== See also ==
- List of rivers of Quebec
