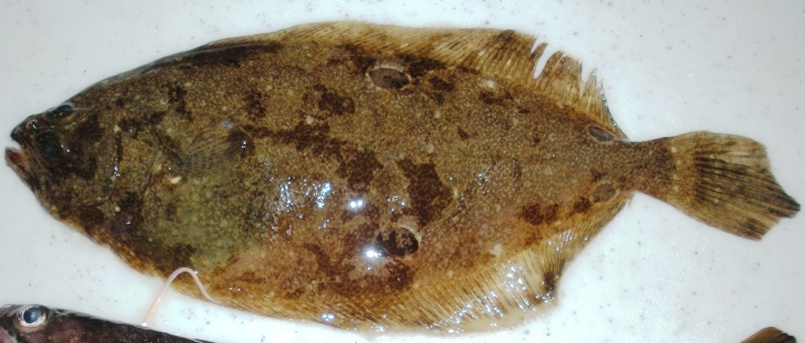

Conservation status
- Least Concern (IUCN 3.1)

Scientific classification
- Kingdom: Animalia
- Phylum: Chordata
- Class: Actinopterygii
- Order: Carangiformes
- Suborder: Pleuronectoidei
- Family: Paralichthyidae
- Genus: Hippoglossina
- Species: H. oblonga

Binomial name
- Hippoglossina oblonga (Mitchill, 1815)

Synonyms
- Paralichthys oblongus (Mitchill, 1815); Pleuronectes oblongus Mitchill, 1815

= Hippoglossina oblonga =

Fourspot flounder

Species of fish

Hippoglossina oblonga (the fourspot flounder, American fourspot flounder or simply four-spot), is a flatfish and member of the large-tooth flounder family Paralichthyidae. This species has been placed in the genus Paralichthys by some authorities.

== Description ==
As with most left-eye flounders they can change the color and pattern of their dark side to match the surrounding bottom, and are also capable of rapidly burrowing into muddy or sandy bottoms. The back, which may vary in overall color from light brown to dark gray, is marked with four large and quite conspicuous black "eye-like" spots edged with a much lighter color, two of them situated at each margin of the body. The teeth are sharp and well developed. The underside is pale pinkish, almost translucent in certain areas. Data collected from fishing trawlers suggests adults average about 10 to 12 inches (25 to 30 cm) long with 16 inches (41 cm) likely being the maximum size. Adults are predatory and mostly piscivorous, preying on any small fish such as sand lance and Atlantic silverside, as well as squid.

== Habitat ==
A range in the western Atlantic from the Gulf of Maine, and perhaps as far north as Nova Scotia, south to Florida, preferring water depths of at least 12 fathoms (70 ft; 20 m) and as far out as to the continental shelf. Little is documented of the breeding and seasonal migratory habits of this fish.

== Commercial fishing, angling, and food quality ==
The fourspot flounder is most often taken commercially by fishing trawlers. Due to its small size and lack of abundance inshore it is not prized or even well known by recreational anglers who may often mistake this flounder for its relative the Summer Flounder Paralichthys dentatus, as it shares a similar offshore range, appearance, and feeding habits. In addition to the obvious four spots and more translucent underside, the fourspot flounder can also be identified from the Summer Flounder by its slightly more elongated shape and proportionately larger eyes. The meat is white and considered to have a very mild taste like that of the summer flounder and southern flounder (Paralichthys lethostigma).
