= Cran =

Cran may refer to:

- C-RAN, cellular network architecture
- Comprehensive R Archive Network
- Cran (unit), of uncleaned herring
- Representative Council of France's Black Associations

== Surname ==
- Chris Cran (born 1949), a Canadian painter
- James Cran (born 1944), a British politician

== Places ==
- Mount Cran, a mountain in New Zealand
- Rivière des Sept Crans, a river in Quebec, Canada
- Rivière du Cran, a river in Quebec, Canada
