= P. adspersus =

P. adspersus may refer to:

- Palaemon adspersus, the Baltic prawn, a shrimp species
- Paralichthys adspersus, the fine flounder, a flatfish species
- Pseudophilautus adspersus, a frog species
- Pternistis adspersus, the red-billed spurfowl, a bird species
- Pyxicephalus adspersus, the African bullfrog, a frog species
