= Indienne River =

Location
- Country: Canada
- Province: Quebec
- Region: Saguenay–Lac-Saint-Jean
- Regional County Municipality: Le Domaine-du-Roy

Physical characteristics
- Source: Little mountain lake
  - location: Lac-Ashuapmushuan
  - coordinates: 48°34′25″N 72°53′08″W
  - elevation: 447 m (1,467 ft)
- Mouth: Ditton River
  - location: Lac-Ashuapmushuan
  - coordinates: 48°35′27″N 72°52′36″W
  - elevation: 431 m (1,414 ft)
- Length: 2.8 km (1.7 mi)

Basin features
- Progression: Rivière aux Saumons (Ashuapmushuan River), Ashuapmushuan River, Lac Saint-Jean, Saguenay River, Saint Lawrence River

The Indienne river ("Indienne" is the female form in French of "Indian") is a tributary of Lac Le Barrois (lake in the upper area of the rivière aux Saumons), flowing in the unorganized territory of Lac-Ashuapmushuan, in the MRC of Le Domaine-du-Roy Regional County Municipality, in the administrative region of Saguenay–Lac-Saint-Jean, in the province of Quebec, in Canada.

The Doré river valley is mainly served by forest roads.

Forestry (mainly forestry) is the main economic activity in the upper part of this valley; recreotourism activities, second.

== Geography ==
The Indian river draws its source at the mouth of Lake Vienne (length: 3.6 km (2.2 mi) of Y shape; altitude: 447 m (1,467 ft)) in the forest area of the unorganized territory of Lac-Ashuapmushuan. This lake is fed to the northwest by the Nevers stream. The mouth of Lake Vienna is located at:

- 23.3 km (14.5 mi) south-west of the village center of La Doré;
- 33.5 km (20.8 mi) southwest of downtown Saint-Félicien;
- 2.1 km (1.3 mi) south of the mouth of the Indian River.

From its source, the Indian River flows for 2.8 km (1.7 mi) north in a straight line, with a drop of 16.0 m (52.5 ft), entirely in forest area and crossing an area of marshland at the end of the journey.

The Indian river flows at the bottom of the Indian bay, on the southern shore of Lac Le Barrois which is a lake in the upper part of the rivière aux Saumons. This confluence is located at:

- 6.9 km (4.3 mi) west of Lake Clarvaux;
- 2.5 km (1.6 mi) south of the mouth of Lac Le Barrois.

From the mouth of the Indiennne river, the current crosses Lac Le Barrois to the north for 2.8 km (1.7 mi), then descends the course of the Rivière aux Salmon on 44.7 km (27.8 mi), the course of the Ashuapmushuan River towards the southeast on 18 km (11 mi), then crosses Lac Saint-Jean towards is on 41.1 km (25.5 mi) (ie its full length), follows the course of the Saguenay river via the Petite Décharge on 172.3 km (107.1 mi) eastwards to Tadoussac where it merges with the estuary of Saint Lawrence.

== Toponymy ==
The toponym "Indian river" was formalized on September 22, 1976, at the Place Names Bank of the Commission de toponymie du Québec.

== See also ==
- List of rivers of Quebec
