= Rivière au Doré =

Location
- Country: Canada
- Province: Quebec
- Region: Saguenay–Lac-Saint-Jean
- Regional County Municipality: Le Domaine-du-Roy Regional County Municipality

Physical characteristics
- Source: Little lake
  - location: La Doré
  - coordinates: 48°47′16″N 72°44′30″W
  - elevation: 253 m (830 ft)
- Mouth: Ditton River
  - location: Saint-Félicien
  - coordinates: 48°37′16″N 72°44′30″W
  - elevation: 150 m (490 ft)
- Length: 20.5 km (12.7 mi)

Basin features
- Progression: Rivière aux Saumons (Ashuapmushuan River), Ashuapmushuan River, Lac Saint-Jean, Saguenay River, Saint Lawrence River

The Rivière au Doré is a tributary of rivière aux Saumons, flowing in the municipalities of La Doré and the town of Saint-Félicien, in the Le Domaine-du-Roy Regional County Municipality, in the administrative region of Saguenay–Lac-Saint-Jean, in the province of Quebec, in Canada.

The Doré river valley is mainly served by the chemin du rang Saint-Eugène (route 167).

Forestry (mainly forestry) is the main economic activity in the upper part of this valley; agriculture, in the middle and lower part.

== Geography ==
The Doré river draws its source at the mouth of a small lake (length: 0.2 km (0.12 mi) of triangular shape; altitude: 253 m (830 ft)) in forest area in the municipality from La Doré. This source is located at:

- 0.7 km (0.43 mi) east of the course of the Pémonca River;
- 10.7 km (6.6 mi) north-west of the village center of La Doré;
- 26.7 km (16.6 mi) northwest of downtown Saint-Félicien;
- 15.3 km (9.5 mi) north-west of the mouth of the Doré river.

From its source, the Rivière au Doré flows over 20.5 km (12.7 mi) with a drop of 103 m (338 ft), especially in agricultural and village areas at the end of the route, depending on the segments following:

- 6.6 km (4.1 mi) first on 1.8 km (1.1 mi) towards the northeast to a bend in the river, then towards the southeast by collecting the discharge (coming from the south west) of a lake, crossing Lac des Hôtes (length: 0.4 km (0.25 mi); altitude: 171 m (561 ft), to the north shore of lac Ouitouche Nord;
- 1.2 km (0.75 mi) south-east across Lake Ouitouche North (altitude: 171 m (561 ft)) over its full length to its mouth. Note: Lac Ouitouche Nord is fed by the outlet (from the west) of four lakes. Lake Ouitouche Nord has a large peninsula attached to the southwest shore;
- 0.4 km (0.25 mi) towards the east by cutting the istm connecting lakes Ouitouche North and Ouitouche South, crossing Lake Ouitouche South (length: 0.8 km (0.50 mi); altitude: 168 m (551 ft)), to its mouth. Note: Lac Ouitouche Sud is mainly fed by the discharge (coming from the south) of a lake and the discharge (coming from the southwest) of some small lakes including Lac Rond;
- 2.6 km (1.6 mi) to the east relatively in a straight line, in agricultural area, collecting a stream (coming from the north) and collecting the discharge (coming from the west) of some lakes including Lac Lamarre, to chemin du Rang Saint-Eugène (route 167);
- 5.3 km (3.3 mi) crossing a small lake, collecting the discharge (from the north) of a small lake, cutting avenue Desjardins at 1.7 km (1.1 mi) north- east of the center of the village La Doré, turning southeast, until the confluence of the river Doré Ouest (coming from the west). Note: This segment of river drains a large area of marsh (length: 7.9 km (4.9 mi) with nine streams, passing on the southwest side of this marsh;
- 4.4 km (2.7 mi) towards the east by forming a loop towards the north by collecting a stream (coming from the northwest) in court, to its mouth.

The Rivière au Doré flows on the north bank of the Rivière aux Saumons, facing a small island and upstream from rapids around another island in the Rivière aux Saumons. This confluence is located at:

- 11.4 km (7.1 mi) west of downtown Saint-Félicien;
- 20.7 km (12.9 mi) north-west of the mouth of the Ashuapmushuan river;
- 33.4 km (20.8 mi) northwest of downtown Roberval.

From the mouth of the rivière au Doré, the current descends the course of the rivière aux Saumons on 8.2 km (5.1 mi), the course of the river Ashuapmushuan to the south-east on 18 km (11 mi), then crosses Lake Saint-Jean east on 41.1 km (25.5 mi) (ie its full length), follows the course of the Saguenay river via the Petite Décharge on 172.3 km (107.1 mi) eastward to Tadoussac where it merges with the estuary of Saint Lawrence.

== Toponymy ==
The term "Golden" refers to a species of fish.

The toponym “Rivière au Doré” was formalized on December 5, 1968, at the Place Names Bank of the Commission de toponymie du Québec.

== See also ==
- List of rivers of Quebec
