= Rivière aux Trembles =

Rivière aux Trembles Old name: "Pémonca River"

Location
- Country: Canada
- Province: Quebec
- Region: Saguenay–Lac-Saint-Jean
- Regional County Municipality: Le Domaine-du-Roy Regional County Municipality

Physical characteristics
- Source: Little lake
  - location: Lac-Ashuapmushuan
  - coordinates: 48°46′00″N 73°00′26″W
  - elevation: 440 m (1,440 ft)
- Mouth: Ashuapmushuan River
  - location: Lac-Ashuapmushuan
  - coordinates: 48°44′45″N 72°47′55″W
  - elevation: 272 m (892 ft)
- Length: 23.4 km (14.5 mi)

Basin features
- Progression: Pémonca River, Ashuapmushuan River, Lac Saint-Jean, Saguenay River, Saint Lawrence River
- Tributaries
  - left: (upstream) discharge from some lakes, including Dalle, Estillac, at Dinner and Faillant, discharge from Lake Commana, discharge from several lakes including Pacaus, Rénald and Figeac, discharge from a small lake, discharge from Lake Allegrin.
  - right: (upstream) stream, discharge from several lakes including Tesser and at Valère, stream, discharge from Lake Provin, stream, discharge from Lake Quenne, stream, discharge from a set of lakes including Auvray, Cassis and Dazé, discharge from Lake Aubord.

The rivière aux Trembles (English: Aspen River) is a tributary of Pémonca River, flowing in the unorganized territory of Lac-Ashuapmushuan, in the Le Domaine-du-Roy Regional County Municipality, in the administrative region of Saguenay–Lac-Saint-Jean, in the province from Quebec, to Canada.

The Trembles river valley is mainly served by forest roads. Its course more or less marks the southern limit of the Ashuapmushuan Wildlife Reserve.

Forestry (mainly forestry) is the main economic activity in this valley; recreational tourism activities, second, main because of the Ashuapmushuan wildlife reserve.

== Geography ==
The Trembles river has its source at the mouth of a small lake (altitude: 440 m (1,440 ft)). This source is located in a forest area in the municipality of La Doré, at:

- 2.6 km (1.6 mi) east of the course of the rivière du Cran;
- 1.4 km (0.87 mi) north of a mountain peak (altitude: 569 m (1,867 ft));
- 43 km (27 mi) west of downtown Saint-Félicien.

From its source, the Trembles river flows on 23.4 km (14.5 mi) with a drop of 168 m (551 ft), especially in agricultural and village areas at the end of the route, depending on the segments following:

- 5.0 km (3.1 mi) to the east, collecting at the beginning of the segment the discharge (coming from the south) from Lac Aubord and at the end of the segment the discharge (coming from the north) from Lac Allegrin, to a river bend, corresponding to a stream (coming from the north);
- 9.4 km (5.8 mi) towards the north-east, forming a loop towards the south at the start of the segment, then going up towards the north-east relatively in a straight line, collecting the discharge (coming from the north) from the Lake du Héron, the outlet of Lac de la Dalle, collecting 4 streams (coming from the south), and turning east at the end of the segment, up to a bend in the river;
- 5.0 km (3.1 mi) towards the south-east while bending towards the east at the end of the segment, until the discharge (coming from the south) of a set of lakes including Vert, du Cordon, and stirrup;
- 4.0 km (2.5 mi) to the north, forming a loop to the southeast to collect the discharge (coming from the southeast) of a stream, to its mouth.

The Rivière aux Trembles pours into the bottom of a narrow bay to the south-east of Lac à la Truite, which turns out to be one of the two head lakes of the Pémonca river. This confluence is located at:

- 28.0 km (17.4 mi) north-west of downtown Saint-Félicien;
- 11.7 km (7.3 mi) south-west of the mouth of the Pémonca River.

From the mouth of the Trembles river, the current of the Pémonca River descends on 15.8 km (9.8 mi) the course of the Pémonca River, the current descends the course of the Ashuapmushuan river on 37.6 km (23.4 mi), then crosses Lake Saint-Jean east on 41.1 km (25.5 mi) (i.e. its full length), follows the course of the Saguenay River via the Petite Décharge on 172.3 km (107.1 mi) eastwards to Tadoussac where it merges with the estuary of Saint Lawrence.

== Toponymy ==
The toponym "rivière Pémonca" was formalized on December 5, 1968, at the Place Names Bank of the Commission de toponymie du Québec.

== See also ==
- List of rivers of Quebec
