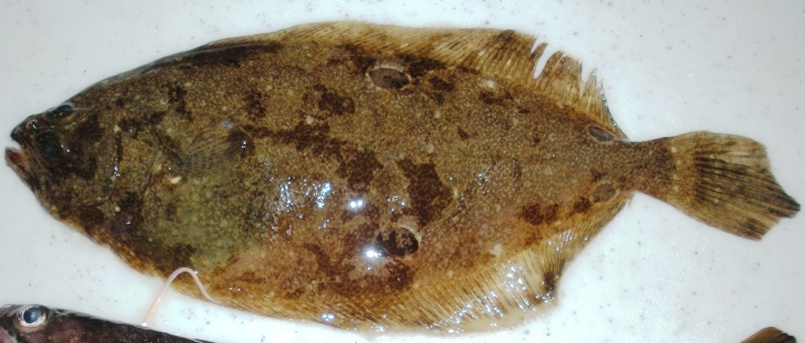
- Hippoglossina oblonga

Scientific classification
- Kingdom: Animalia
- Phylum: Chordata
- Class: Actinopterygii
- Order: Carangiformes
- Suborder: Pleuronectoidei
- Family: Paralichthyidae
- Genus: Hippoglossina; Steindachner, 1876

Type species
- Hippoglossina macrops Steindachner 1876

Synonyms
- Lioglossina Gilbert, 1890

= Hippoglossina =

Genus of fishes

Hippoglossina is a genus of large-tooth flounders native to the coastal Pacific waters of the Americas. A single species, H. oblonga is found along the Atlantic coast of United States and Canada, but it is frequently placed in Paralichthys instead of Hippoglossina.

== Species ==
The currently recognized species in this genus are:

- Hippoglossina bollmani C. H. Gilbert, 1890
- Hippoglossina macrops Steindachner, 1876 (bigeye flounder)
- Hippoglossina montemaris F. de Buen, 1961
- Hippoglossina mystacium Ginsburg, 1936
- Hippoglossina oblonga (Mitchill, 1815) (American fourspot flounder) – often placed in Paralichthys instead
- Hippoglossina stomata C. H. Eigenmann & R. S. Eigenmann, 1890 (bigmouth flounder)
- Hippoglossina tetrophthalma (C. H. Gilbert, 1890) (fourspot flounder)
