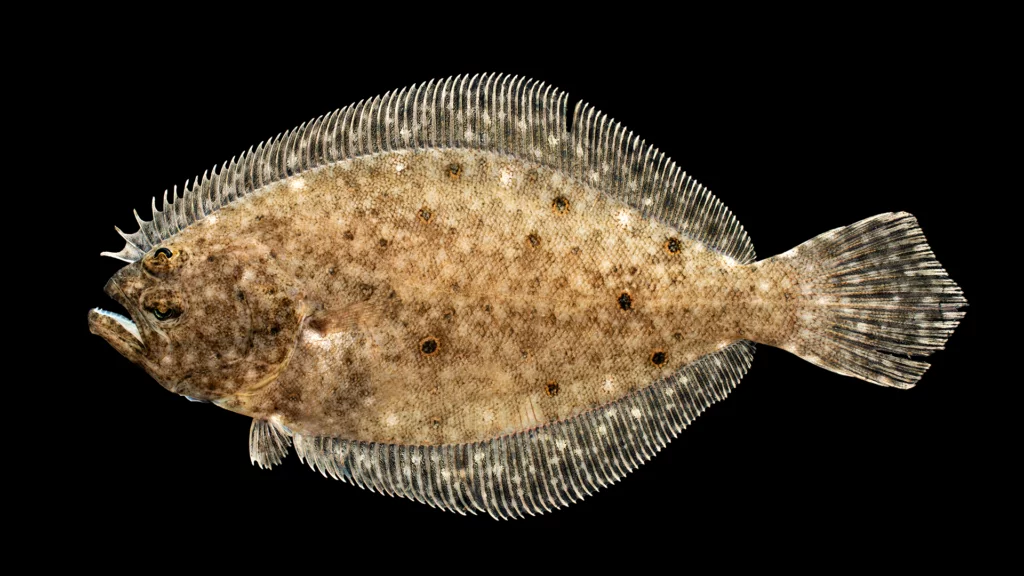

Conservation status
- Least Concern (IUCN 3.1)

Scientific classification
- Kingdom: Animalia
- Phylum: Chordata
- Class: Actinopterygii
- Division: Teleostei
- Order: Carangiformes
- Suborder: Pleuronectoidei
- Family: Paralichthyidae
- Genus: Paralichthys
- Species: P. dentatus

Binomial name
- Paralichthys dentatus (Linnaeus, 1766)

Synonyms
- Pleuronectes dentatus Linnaeus, 1766

= Summer flounder =

Summer flounder (fluke)

Species of fish

The summer flounder or fluke (Paralichthys dentatus) is a marine flatfish that is found in the Atlantic Ocean off the East Coast of the United States and Canada. It is especially abundant in waters from North Carolina to Massachusetts.

They have laterally-compressed bodies meaning that their body is flattened side-to-side. Covering the body are eye-like spots.

== Habitat ==
The summer flounder has a range in the western Atlantic from Nova Scotia to Florida, possibly farther south where the summer flounder may mix and be confused with its close relative the southern flounder (Paralichthys lethostigma) which lacks the eye-like spots of the summer flounder. Paralichthys dentatus is most common to the coastal and shelf waters off of the northeast U.S. where they are commonly called Fluke. In the spring months fluke leave their winter stay in the deep ocean waters, where spawning occurs, to move into the inshore waters along beaches, inlets, bays, estuaries, canals, and creeks where they will stay until autumn or even early winter.

== Description ==
They typically grow around 38.1-50.8 cm (15 to 20 inch) in length and weighs around (0.4-1.3 kg 1 to 3 lbs) though they may grow as heavy as 9 kg (26 lbs). The average summer flounder reaches sexual maturity at 2 years and lives up to 20 years. Females are often the largest and oldest specimens. The maximum observed age for females is 17 years while males have a maximum observed age of 15 years.

There are typically 5 to 14 ocellated (eye-like) spots on the body. The teeth are quite sharp and well developed on both upper and lower jaws.

== Behavior ==
Adults are highly predatory and considered mostly piscivorous. They are often lie buried with only their head exposed to ambush prey. Prey items includes sand lance, menhaden, atlantic silverside, mummichog killifish, small bluefish, porgies, squid, shrimp, and crabs. While primarily considered a bottom fish, they are rapid swimmers over short distances and can become very aggressive, feeding actively at mid-depths, even chasing prey to the surface.

They are capable of rapidly burrowing into muddy or sandy bottoms.

Like most members of the left-eye flounders, they have exceptional capacity for dynamic camouflage being able to change the color and pattern of their dark side to match the surrounding bottom. They are able to match the substrate with a high degree of precision, including the different sizes of grains and artificial checkerboards. However since their eyes face away from the bottom, it is unknown if this process is vision-mediated.

== Commercial fishing, angling, and food quality ==
Commercial methods for summer flounder typically include trawling. Recreational fishing is typically done while drifting in a boat or casting from shore using a wide variety of methods which include live or cut baits on a bottom rig, artificial lures, or weighted jigs tipped with strip baits. It is considered an excellent food fish with firm, mild-tasting white flesh.

== Management ==
The summer flounder is often considered to be, by far, the most important flounder along the Atlantic coast as it is important to both the commercial fishing industry and very popular for recreational fishing in the northeast United States. In addition to commercial fishing, businesses such as recreational charters, party boats, bait and tackle stores, and any number of businesses associated with boating and angling may depend on a viable summer flounder angling season. Because of this importance there has been much debate and concern over summer flounder populations and government imposed recreational size and creel regulations which currently vary from state to state. Recent debate has centered on whether summer flounder are on the decline due to overfishing, and this has made the summer flounder an important species of topic in the reauthorization of the Magnuson-Stevens Fishery Conservation and Management Act of 2006.

The Mid-Atlantic Fishery Management Council provides management of the summer flounder species. The management of summer flounder is established between the U.S.-Canadian border to North Carolina's southern border. Due to summer flounder migrating between federal and state waters, the management council works in conjunction with the Atlantic State Marine Fisheries Commission and the National Marine Fisheries Service (NMFS).
