= Pémonca River =

Location
- Country: Canada
- Province: Quebec
- Region: Saguenay–Lac-Saint-Jean
- Regional County Municipality: Le Domaine-du-Roy Regional County Municipality

Physical characteristics
- Source: Lac à la Truite and Lake Crapaud
  - location: Lac-Ashuapmushuan
  - coordinates: 48°45′59″N 72°48′17″W
  - elevation: 272 m (892 ft)
- Mouth: Ashuapmushuan River
  - location: La Doré
  - coordinates: 48°42′56″N 72°37′28″W
  - elevation: 169 m (554 ft)
- Length: 15.8 km (9.8 mi)

Basin features
- Progression: Ashuapmushuan River, Lac Saint-Jean, Saguenay River, Saint Lawrence River

The Pémonca river is a tributary of Ashuapmushuan River, flowing in the unorganized territory of Lac-Ashuapmushuan and in the municipality of La Doré, in the Le Domaine-du-Roy Regional County Municipality, in the administrative region of Saguenay–Lac-Saint-Jean, in the province of Quebec, in Canada.

The Pémonca river valley is mainly served by rang Saint-Eugène road (route 167), Pémonca road and forest roads.

Forestry (mainly forestry) is the main economic activity in this valley.

== Geography ==
The Pémonca river draws its source at the mouth of Trout Lake (length: 2.6 km (1.6 mi); altitude: 272 m (892 ft)) which is linked by the northwest to the Lake du Crapaud (length: 1.1 km (0.68 mi); altitude: 272 m (892 ft)). Lac à la Truite is fed by the outlet (coming from the east) from Lac Villard, by the Rivière aux Trembles (coming from the south-east), by the outlet from Étang aux Beavers (coming from South West). Lac du Crapaud is fed mainly by the outlet (coming from the west) of lakes Donnery and Sécheras.

The mouth of Lac à la Truite is located in a forest area in the municipality of La Doré, at:

- 7.1 km (4.4 mi) south-west of the hamlet Pémonca;
- 11.4 km (7.1 mi) south-west of the mouth of the Pémonca river
- 12.8 km (8.0 mi) west of the village center of La Doré;
- 29.3 km (18.2 mi) west of downtown Saint-Félicien.

From its source, the Pémonca river flows over 15.8 km (9.8 mi) with a drop of 103 m (338 ft), especially in the agricultural and village areas at the end of the route, according to the following segments:

- 9.8 km (6.1 mi) towards the north-east by forming a mouth towards the south-east, by collecting the discharge (coming from the north) from Lake Armiens, and the discharge (coming from the north) from Lake Billy; turning north to a bend in the river corresponding to the outlet (from the west) of lakes Boran and Verville; then north-east in a deep valley, to the outlet (coming from the north) of Lake Sarry. Note: This segment turns out to be the southern limit of the Ashuapmushuan Wildlife Reserve;
- 6.0 km (3.7 mi) towards the east first by crossing the chemin du rang Saint-Eugène (route 167), forming a large curve towards the south, while forming numerous streamers, as well as passing under the railway bridge, to its mouth.

The Pémonca River flows on the southwest bank of the Ashuapmushuan River, either opposite Trembles Island (length: 1.3 km (0.81 mi)) and upstream of another island. This confluence is located upstream of five series of rapids including the Little fall at the Bear and the Great fall at the Bear, and at:

- 22.0 km (13.7 mi) northwest of downtown Saint-Félicien;
- 30.8 km (19.1 mi) north-west of the mouth of the Ashuapmushuan river.

From the mouth of the Pémonca River, the current descends the course of the Ashuapmushuan River on 37.6 km (23.4 mi), then crosses Lake Saint-Jean east on 41.1 km (25.5 mi) (ie its full length), follows the course of the Saguenay River via the Petite Décharge on 172.3 km (107.1 mi) eastwards to Tadoussac where it merges with the estuary of Saint Lawrence.

== Toponymy ==
The term "Pémonca" is used to designate a river, a hamlet, a lake and rapids, all located in the same area. This term is of Innu origin, meaning "the river is bordered by sand". The 1914 Dictionary of the rivers and lakes of the province of Quebec refers to the toponym "Pemonka river". Formerly, the upper course of the Pémonca river was designated "Trembles river". The Innu designate this river "Mingouche".
