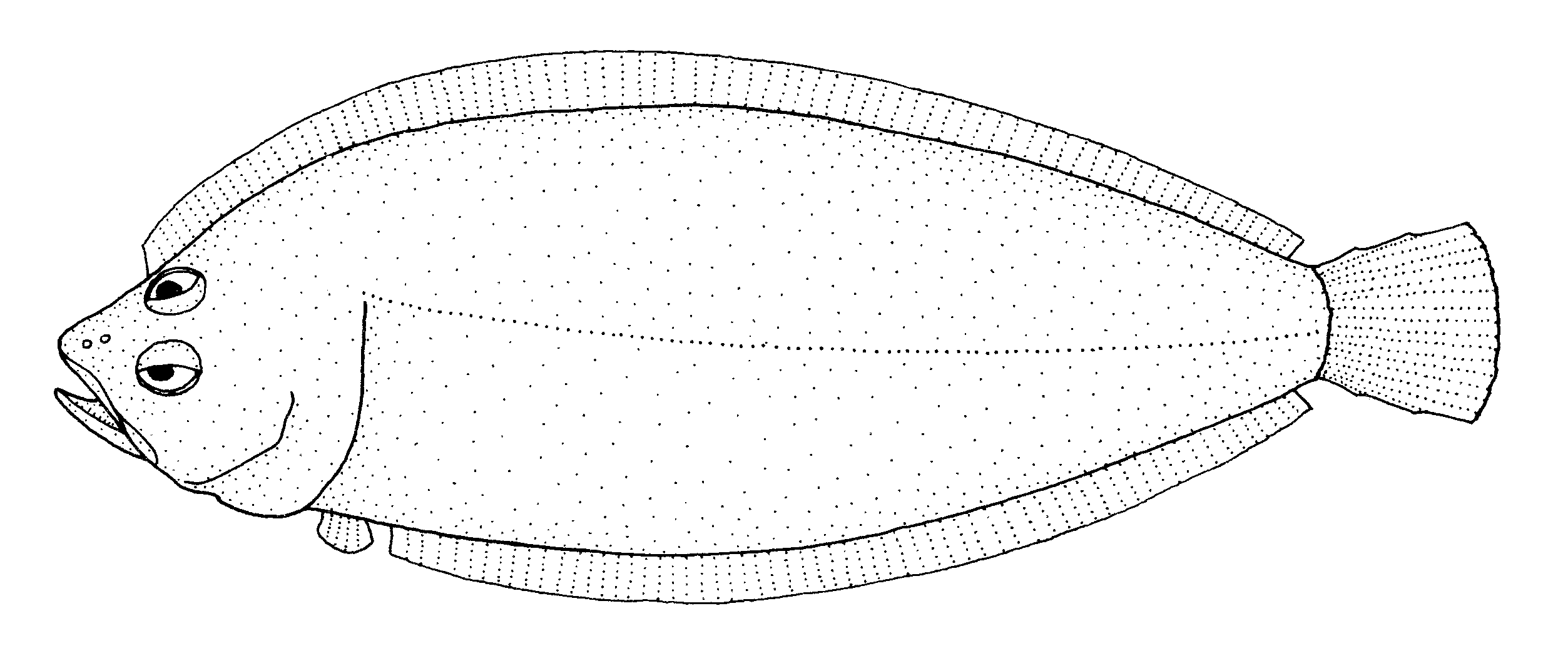
- Drawing by Dr Tony Ayling

Scientific classification
- Domain: Eukaryota
- Kingdom: Animalia
- Phylum: Chordata
- Class: Actinopterygii
- Order: Carangiformes
- Suborder: Pleuronectoidei
- Family: Achiropsettidae
- Genus: Neoachiropsetta; Kotlyar, 1978
- Species: N. milfordi

Binomial name
- Neoachiropsetta milfordi (M. J. Penrith, 1965)

= Armless flounder =

Species of fish

Neoachiropsetta milfordi, the armless flounder or finless flounder, is a species of southern flounder, the only member of the genus Neoachiropsetta. It is found in Antarctic and subantarctic waters, in depths of between 100 and 1,000 metres (330 and 3,280 ft), and grows to a length of 57 centimetres (22 in).
