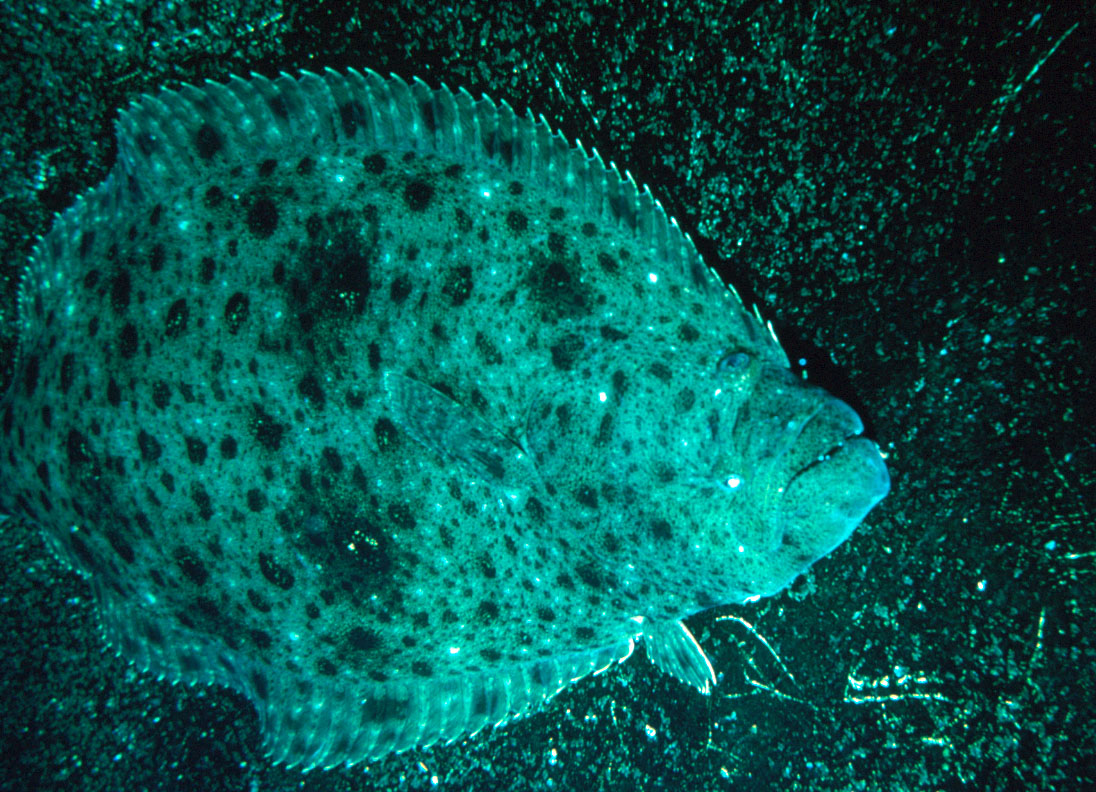

Conservation status
- Least Concern (IUCN 3.1)

Scientific classification
- Kingdom: Animalia
- Phylum: Chordata
- Class: Actinopterygii
- Order: Carangiformes
- Suborder: Pleuronectoidei
- Family: Paralichthyidae
- Genus: Paralichthys
- Species: P. californicus

Binomial name
- Paralichthys californicus (Ayres, 1859)

Synonyms
- Hippoglossus californicus Ayres, 1859

= California halibut =

Species of fish

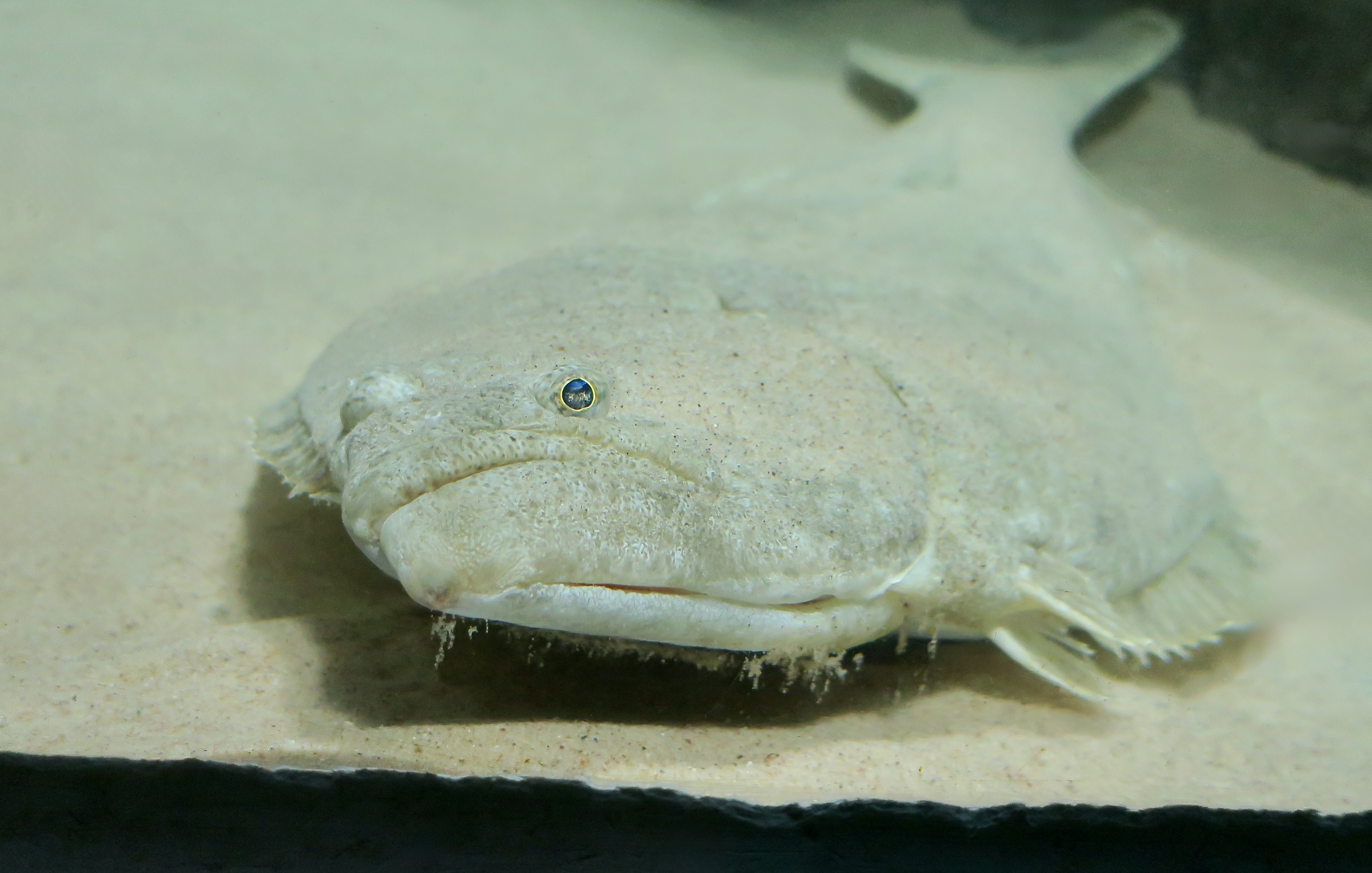
A California halibut at OdySea Aquarium.

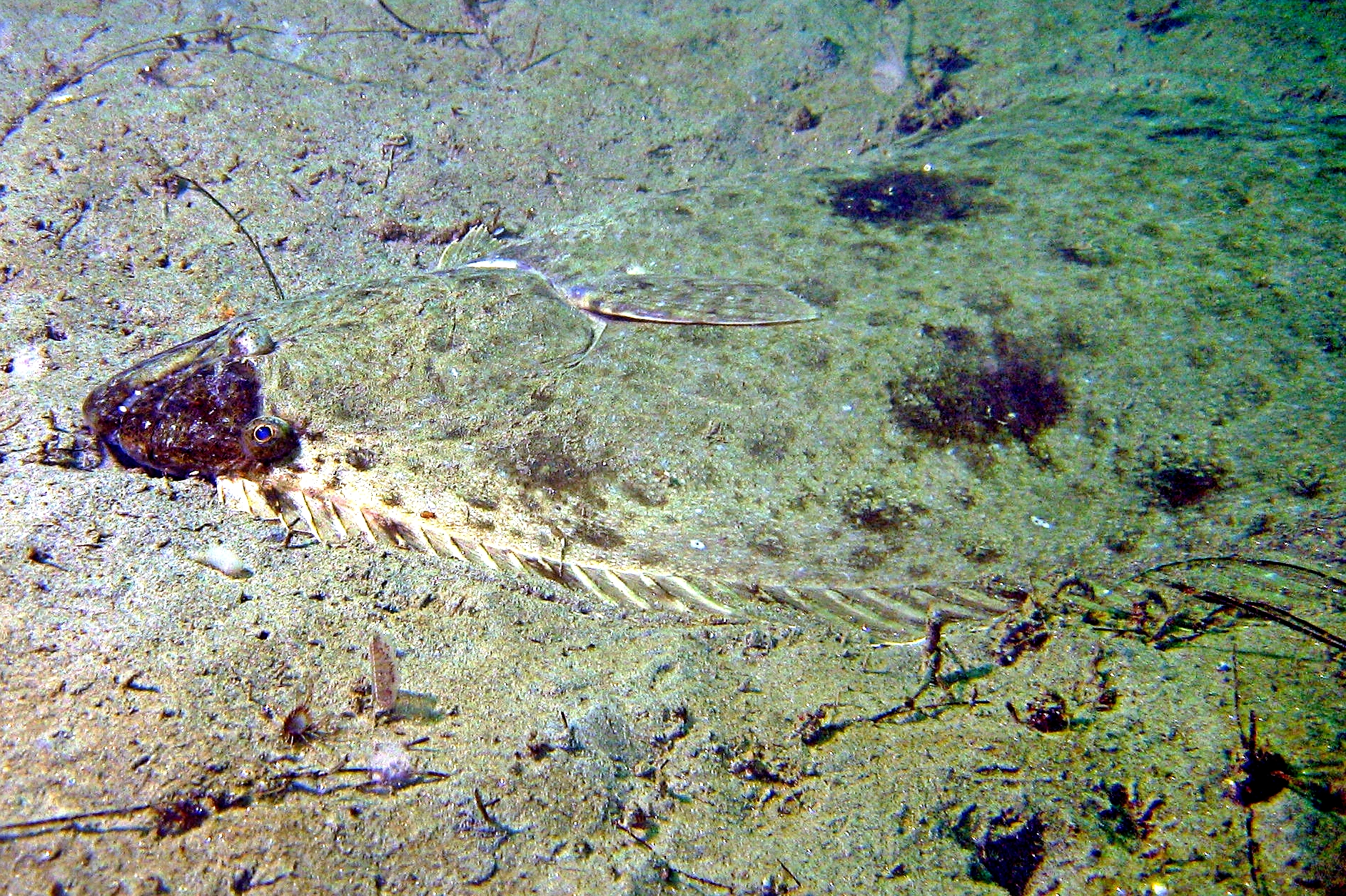
A well camouflaged California halibut

The California halibut or California flounder (Paralichthys californicus) is a large-tooth flounder native to the waters of the Pacific Coast of North America from the Quillayute River in Washington to Magdalena Bay in Baja California Sur.

This is a demersal fish, living primarily in the lower water column as adults. They inhabit near shore regions and are free swimming. This is an unusual fish in that one eye migrates around from one side to the other as it grows from an upright fry or baby fish into an adult fish that lies on its side. This results in the adult fish having two eyes on the up-side as it lies on the ocean floor. Most flatfish are generally either right-eyed or left-eyed dominant, but the California halibut is unusual in having a roughly even number of each type.

Like other flatfish, the halibut hides under sand or loose gravel, camouflaging into the sea floor. They are aggressive predators, using this camouflage to effectively ambush prey such as fishes and invertebrates.

== Description ==
California halibut typically weighs 6 to 30 pounds (3 to 23 kg), with the largest reported weighing 72 pounds (32.7 kg). It is rare, but they can grow up to 60 inches (1.52 m), and their average length is 12 to 24 inches (30 to 61 cm). The largest fish of this species are females since they grow faster, and males do not grow as large. The legal catch limit that applies to all commercial and recreational halibut fisheries is 22 inches and around 4 pounds, and this growth takes them about 3 to 5 years to reach.

This is an unusual fish in that one eye has to migrate around from one side to the other as it grows from a baby fish (fry) into an adult fish that lies on its side. The adult has two eyes on the up-side as it lies on the bottom. Differing from most flatfish species, the California halibut does not show a preference for the side of eye development, with roughly equal left and right sided eye development.

Their body coloration is grayish brown with darker brown spots. They are known to change color and pattern to mimic substrates, serving as incredible camouflage into benthic mud, gravel, and sand. They use this for avoiding predators and to ambush prey.

A fish that closely resembles the California halibut is the Pacific halibut (Hippoglossus stenolepis), which is a larger species found in the northern Pacific Ocean. While the Pacific halibut has a similar flat body shape, it is generally larger and can reach 300 pounds (140 kg), and can be distinguished by its slightly different coloration and the position of the eyes. Additionally, the Pacific halibut inhabits colder waters than the California halibut.

== Distribution and habitat ==
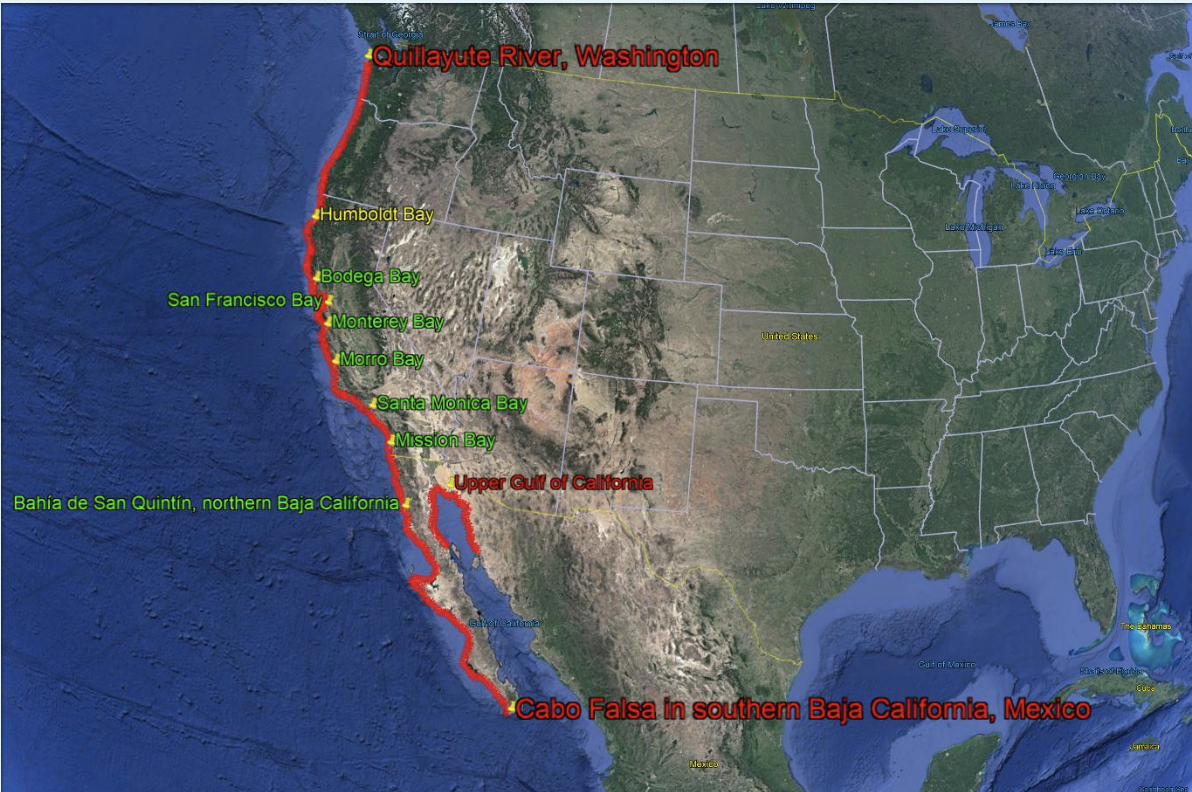
The geographic range for halibut is indicated by a red line and red labels, and the common range is indicated by green labels. Source: https://marinespecies.wildlife.ca.gov/california-halibut/the-species/

The geographic range for California halibut extends from the Quillayute River in northern Washington to Cabo Falsa (22°50'N) in southern Baja California, Mexico. Halibut have also been reported in the upper Gulf of California. They are most commonly encountered within Bodega Bay, northern California, to Bahía de San Quintín, northern Baja California. In association with warm water events, halibut are occasionally common in Humboldt Bay. Within these regions, adult California halibut reside on the seabed, in shallow water areas. However, they are known to go as deep as 317 m.

== Diet and predators ==
Halibut are carnivorous ambush predators that feed on fishes and invertebrates. They lie camouflaged in sediment and will swim up off the seabed to feed on schooling fish and invertebrates such as northern anchovy and market squid. While common prey items vary with geographic location and life stage, other prey generally include species of shrimps, crabs, croakers, flatfish, gobies, herring, mackerel, midshipman, sand lance, saury, sculpins, silversides, and surfperch.

Larger adult halibut are considered a cryptic top predator in the benthic community since this aggressive and carnivorous predator is often elusive in nature and are at a low risk of predation due to their relatively large adult size. Other than humans, marine mammals and larger shark species have been documented to eat adult halibut. However, during juvenile stages, halibut have more predators and are likely eaten by a wide variety of species such as sharks and rays, osprey, cormorants, and terns, and marine mammals such as seals, sea lions, and dolphins.

== Biology and ecology ==
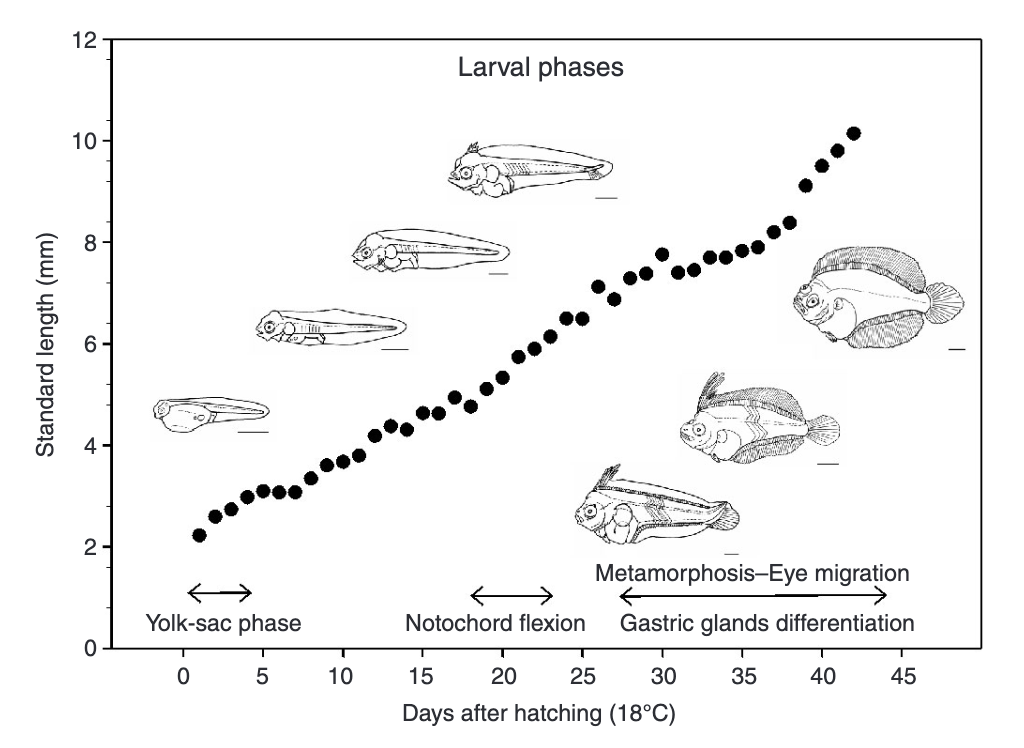
Growth in standard length of California halibut from hatching to the completion of metamorphosis.

California halibut have a maximum lifespan of around 30 years, although individuals rarely live beyond 15 years, and typically only females reach this older age. Like other flatfish, California halibut undergo a unique metamorphosis during their early life stages, transforming from symmetric larvae to asymmetric juveniles. Initially, as larvae, they inhabit the water column, but as they metamorphose, they develop an eye on one side of their head and become bottom-dwelling flatfish. This adaptation allows them to shift from pelagic to benthic habitats, where they spend most of their lives.

These halibut are broadcast spawners with high fecundity, meaning they produce thousands of offspring in each spawning cycle. Spawning occurs primarily from spring to summer, with males and females gathering in offshore waters to release their eggs and sperm into the open water, allowing fertilization to happen externally. This strategy disperses fertilized eggs widely, increasing the chances of larval survival. The spawning season's peak varies by latitude, occurring earliest in Mexican waters and progressing northward through southern and central California. Though spawning occurs outside estuaries, bays like San Francisco Bay serve as essential nursery habitats for juvenile growth and maturation.

Temperature-dependent sex determination is observed in California halibut. When raised at 15 °C, they develop into an equal amount of females and males, but at higher temperatures (19 °C and 23 °C), more males are produced. Additionally, while most flatfish species have a set eye preference, California halibut can develop as either left- or right-eyed, a trait that occurs during metamorphosis around 42 days post-hatching, where one of their eyes migrate over their head to join the same side as their other eye. Juveniles that survive this stage are resilient, particularly to changes in salinity, though older juveniles may have reduced tolerance.

Recruitment success, or survival into adulthood, varies significantly by region, with central California exhibiting higher variability due to factors like upwelling and sea surface temperature, which can impact larval survival rates. This recruitment variability, influenced by abiotic factors, is critical for maintaining healthy population levels, as insufficient recruitment to adulthood can threaten population stability.

== Industry and recreation ==
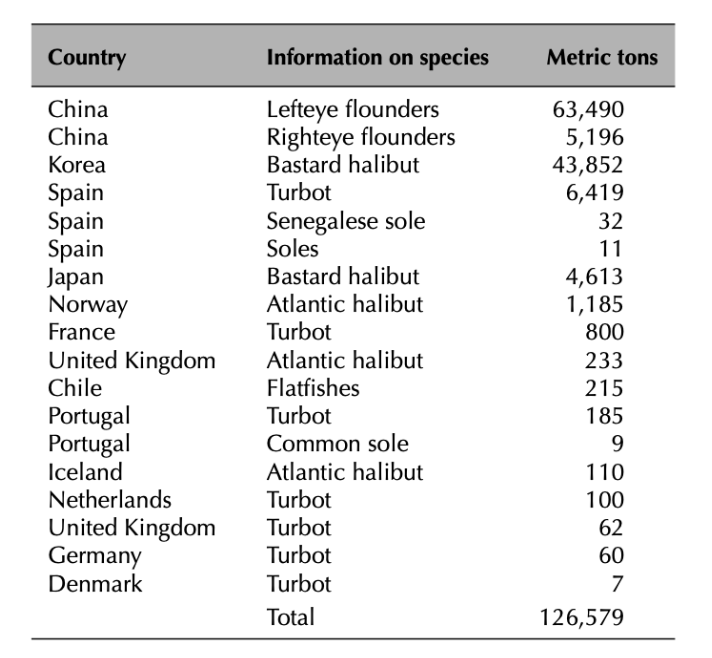
Flatfish aquaculture production by country (FAO 2006)

On the Pacific coast, the California halibut supports important recreational and commercial fisheries throughout its range from the Oregon–Washington border in the United States to the southern part of Baja California in Mexico.

Fishing for both recreational and commercial purposes is open year-round, except that trawling is prohibited from March 15 to June 15 within the California halibut Trawl Grounds in Southern California . Commercial hook-and-line fishing and recreational fishing are permitted throughout the state, except in designated protected areas. The gill net fishing is limited to Southern California, specifically south of Point Arguello. While the trawl fishing is allowed statewide, it must occur outside of state waters. Halibut fishing is commonly conducted from ports ranging from Bodega Bay to San Diego, occasionally extending further north to the port of Eureka. In 2019, halibut fishing activities were reported from all major port complexes across the state.

Various institutions in California, including the University of California – Davis, the California halibut Hatchery in Redondo Beach, and the Hubbs-SeaWorld Research Institute in San Diego, have partnered with organizations in Mexico, such as CICESE in Ensenada and CIBNOR in La Paz, Baja California Sur. Together, they aim to establish the biological groundwork needed to advance the aquaculture of this species, focusing on both juvenile production for stock enhancement and the cultivation of market-sized individuals.

Halibut is a highly valued flatfish and a significant commodity in California. Although available year-round, it is especially abundant in the summer and is commonly found in California's restaurants, grocery stores, and farmers' markets. It can also be purchased directly at the dock, either whole or live. Halibut is rarely frozen, as freezing negatively affects its texture, which contributes to the artisanal nature of this fishery and keeps much of the product local within California.
