= Pseudomancopsetta =

Scientific classification
- Kingdom: Animalia
- Phylum: Chordata
- Class: Actinopterygii
- Division: Teleostei
- Order: Carangiformes
- Suborder: Pleuronectoidei
- Family: Achiropsettidae
- Genus: Pseudomancopsetta; Evseenko, 1984
- Species: P. andriashevi

Binomial name
- Pseudomancopsetta andriashevi Evseenko, 1984

Species of fish

Pseudomancopsetta andriashevi, the Pygmy flounder, is a species of southern flounder known from deep waters off of the southern coast of Chile as well as from around the Crozet Islands and Prince Edward Islands where it occurs at depths of from 200 to 365 metres (656 to 1,198 ft). This species grows to a length of 11 centimetres (4.3 in) SL. This species is the only known member of its genus.
