= Finless flounder =

Scientific classification
- Kingdom: Animalia
- Phylum: Chordata
- Class: Actinopterygii
- Order: Carangiformes
- Suborder: Pleuronectoidei
- Family: Achiropsettidae
- Genus: Achiropsetta; Norman, 1930
- Species: A. tricholepis

Binomial name
- Achiropsetta tricholepis Norman, 1930

Synonyms
- Achiropsetta heterolepis Evseenko, 1987; Mancopsetta argentina Lahille, 1939; Mancopsetta tricholepis (Norman, 1930)

Species of fish

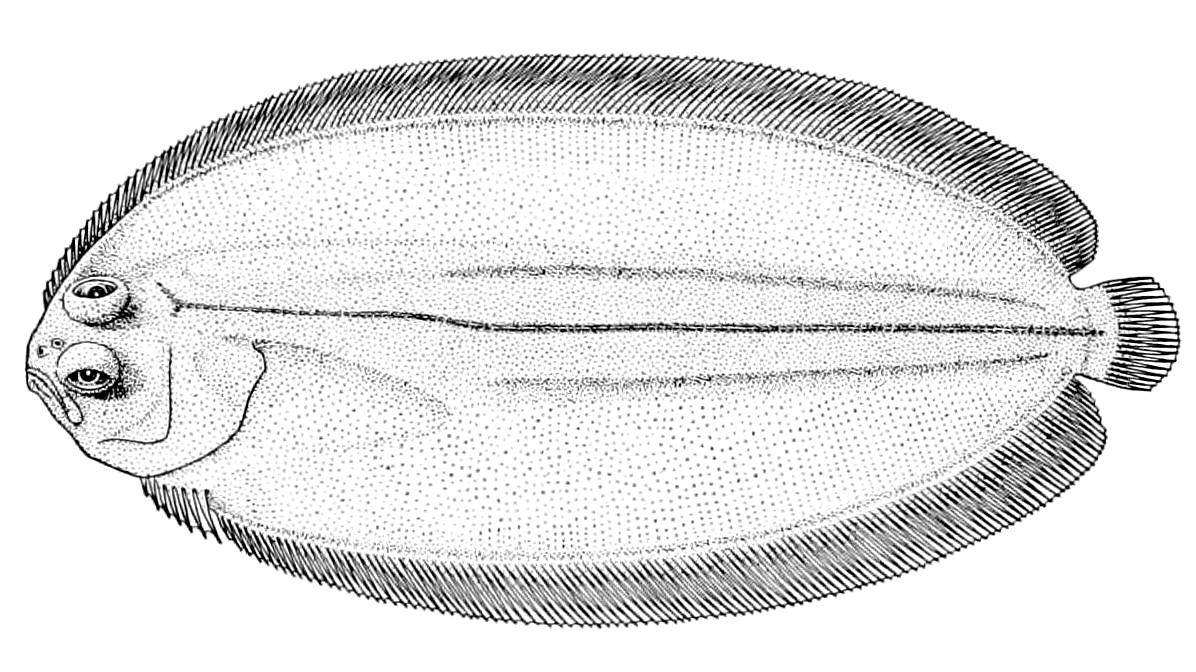
Illustration of the finless flounder

Achiropsetta tricholepis, the Finless flounder or Prickly flounder, is a species of southern flounder with a southern circumpolar distribution. It lives in the Southwest Atlantic Ocean off Patagonia, the Falkland Islands and the Burdwood Bank, and also off the Ob Bank, Kerguelen Islands, Crozet Islands, and the Campbell Plateau. It is usually caught in depths of 21 to 1,186 metres (69 to 3,891 ft). This species can grow to 39 centimetres (15 in) TL.
