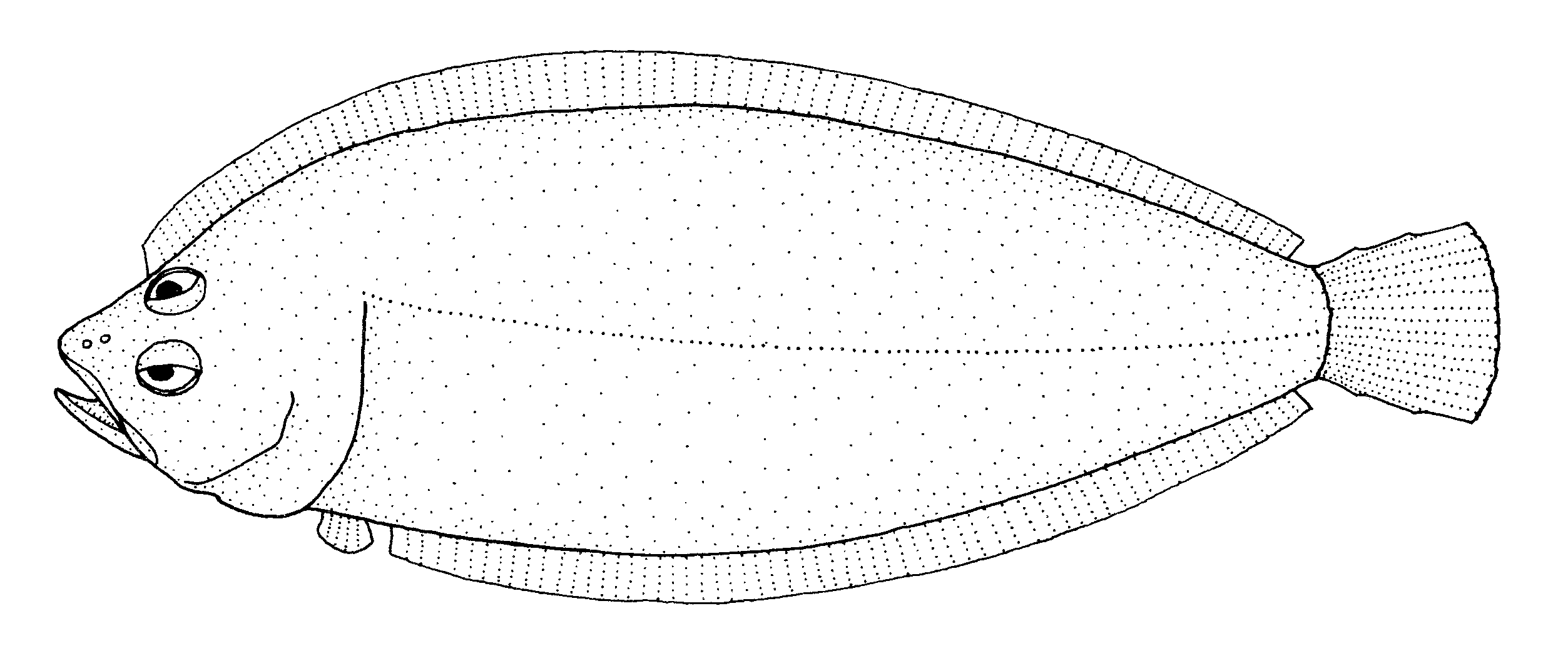
- Armless flounder Neoachiropsetta milfordi

Scientific classification
- Kingdom: Animalia
- Phylum: Chordata
- Class: Actinopterygii
- Order: Carangiformes
- Suborder: Pleuronectoidei
- Family: Achiropsettidae; Heemstra, 1990

Type genus
- Achiropsetta Norman, 1930

Genera
- Achiropsetta; Mancopsetta; Neoachiropsetta; Pseudomancopsetta

= Southern flounder =

Southern flounders

Family of fishes

The southern flounders or armless flounders are a small family, Achiropsettidae, of flounders found in Antarctic and sub-Antarctic waters. There are four genera, each with one species.

The bodies of southern flounders are greatly compressed, with both eyes on the left side of their heads. The caudal fin is separate, and the pectoral fins are rudimentary or entirely absent; none of the fins has spines. The lateral line is straight and well-developed. The family varies considerably in size, from 11 cm (4.3 in) of Pseudomancopsetta andriashevi to the 57 cm (22 in) length of Neoachiropsetta milfordi.

Little is known of the habits of the species in this family.

== See also ==
- Paralichthys lethostigma, another species of a different order also sometimes called a "southern flounder"
