= Antarctic armless flounder =

Scientific classification
- Domain: Eukaryota
- Kingdom: Animalia
- Phylum: Chordata
- Class: Actinopterygii
- Order: Carangiformes
- Suborder: Pleuronectoidei
- Family: Achiropsettidae
- Genus: Mancopsetta; T. N. Gill, 1881
- Species: M. maculata

Binomial name
- Mancopsetta maculata (Günther, 1880)

Species of fish

The Antarctic armless flounder (Mancopsetta maculata) is a species of southern flounder found on subantarctic shelves, around Antarctic islands, and banks off East Antarctica. This species can grow to a length of 50 centimetres (20 in) SL. It lives in depths of from 100 to 1,115 metres (328 to 3,658 ft).
