= Creel (basket) =

Wicker basket used for carrying fish or blocks of peat

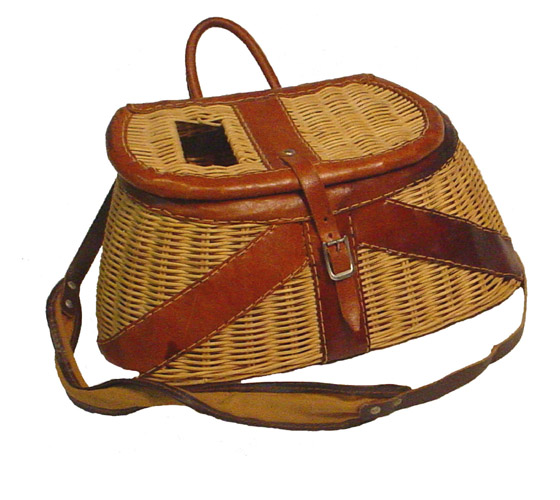
Angler's creel

A creel is a wicker basket usually used for carrying fish or blocks of peat. It is also a fish trap used to catch lobsters and other crustaceans.

In modern times, the term has come to encompass various types of wicker baskets used by anglers or commercial fishermen to hold fish or other prey. The word is also associated with agriculture and some domestic baskets.

In the North Sea herring industry of the nineteenth and twentieth centuries, the creel was a basket used to measure the volume of a catch. The standard measures were creel, which were made in officially approved volumes of one half and one quarter cran (another unit for measuring fresh herring).

An angler's creel is designed to function as an evaporative cooler when lined with moss and dipped into the creek to keep the catch chilled. Caught fish are inserted through a slot in the top, held in place by a small leather strap.

Creels are also the high sides added to a towed trailer, making it more suitable for carrying loose materials such as turf.

== Etymology ==
According to the first edition of the Oxford English Dictionary and the Dictionary of the Older Scottish Tongue, the origin of the word is uncertain. However, the Middle English Dictionary asserts that it derives from Old French "grëil, gräil, grëille, gräille a grill (from L[atin] cratīcula)".

The term "creel" is also attested in Hiberno-English with the same basic meaning of a "wicker basket to transport turf", and thought to derive from Irish críol for basket. The term crïol "basket" is attested in Old/Middle Irish (The OED recognized the similarity to the Old Irish críol, but discounted this etymology based on vowel analysis). Arthur C. L. Brown attempted to show that Irish criol was the word origin of Old French graal (as in Holy Grail), but this is refuted by other scholars. (Note: William A. Nitze criticized the particulars of the etymology, but agrees the idea must have been Celtic, and "the Grail--which in Chretien is partly Christianized-must ultimately go back to the Dagda's Cauldron or its Welsh or Breton equivalent")

== Creels in Scotland ==
The word creel is also used in Scotland to refer to a device used to catch lobsters and other crustaceans. Made of woven netting (similar to that used in traditional fishing net) over a frame of plastic tubing and a slatted wooden base, this type of creel is analogous in function to a lobster pot. Several creels put out on one line can be referred to as a "leader".

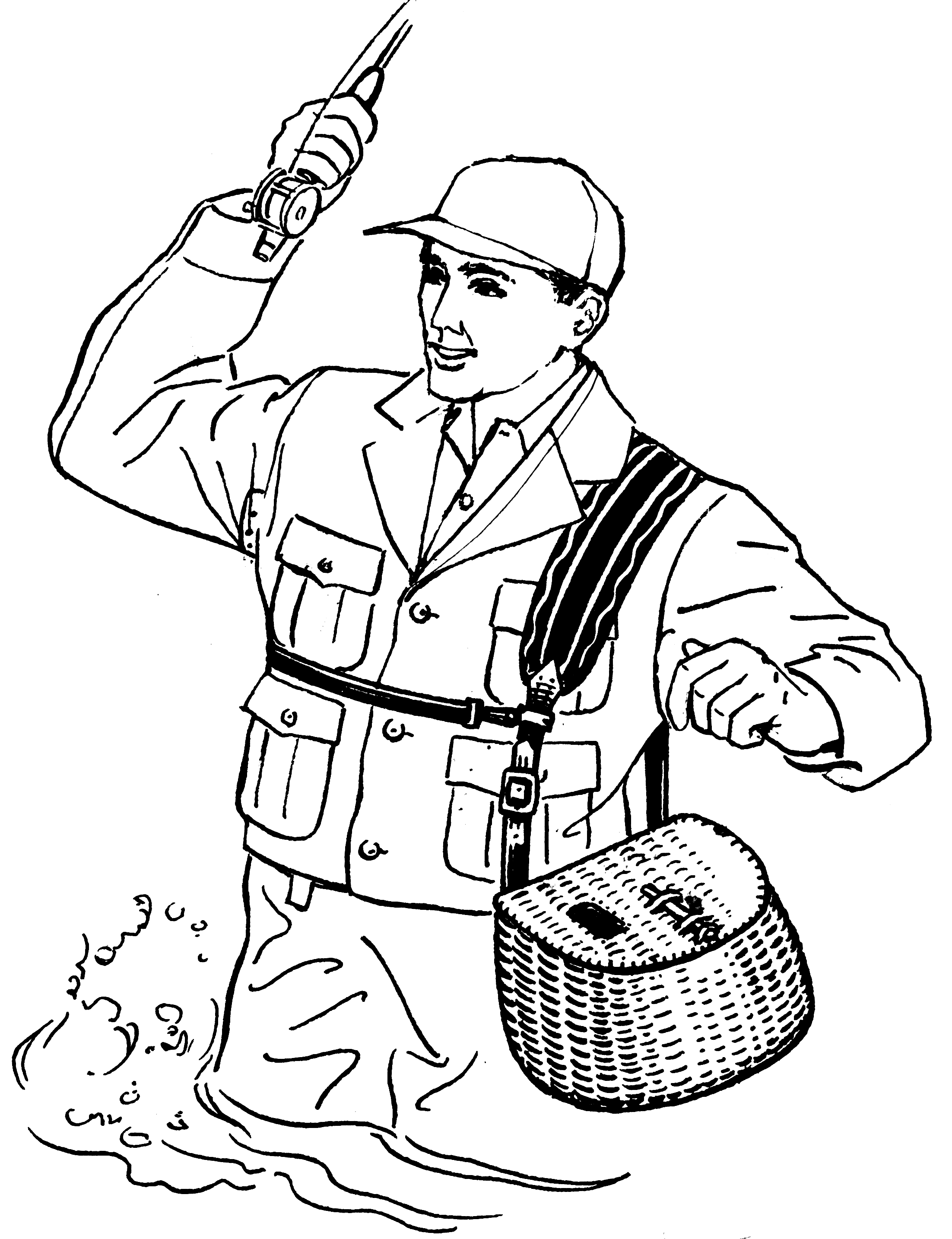
Angler with creel

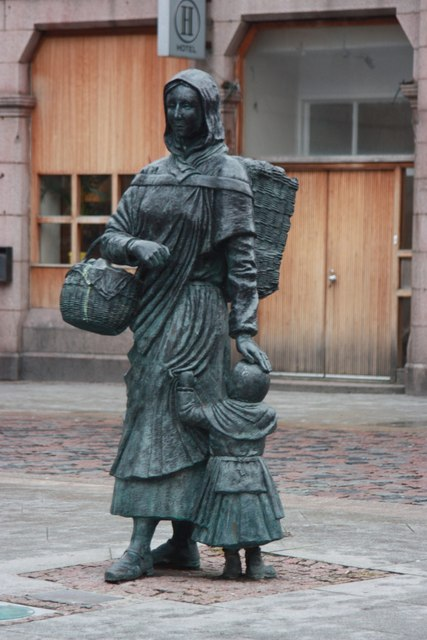
Statue of a fishwife carrying a creel and basket

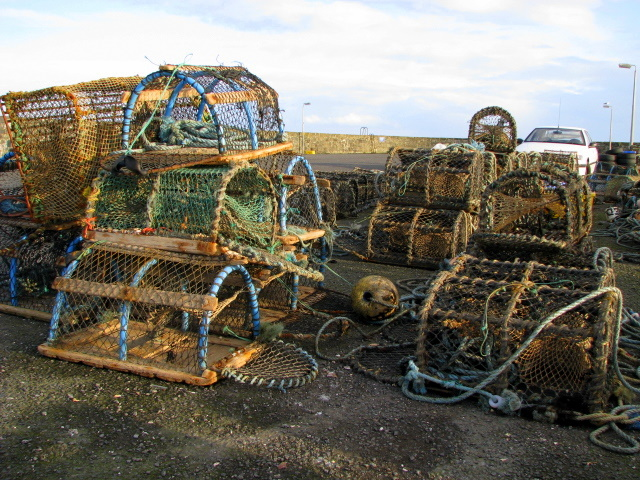
Commercial creels used to catch lobsters

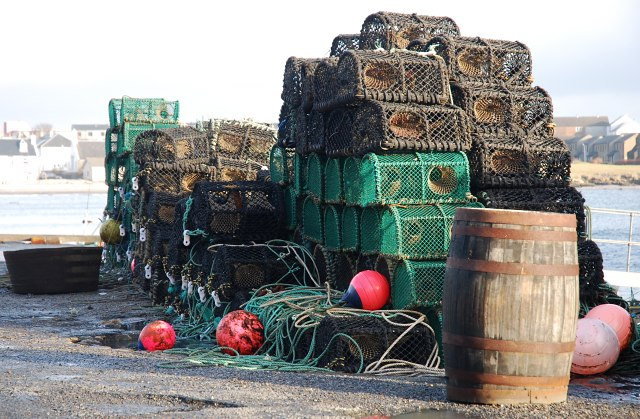
Stack of commercial prawn creels

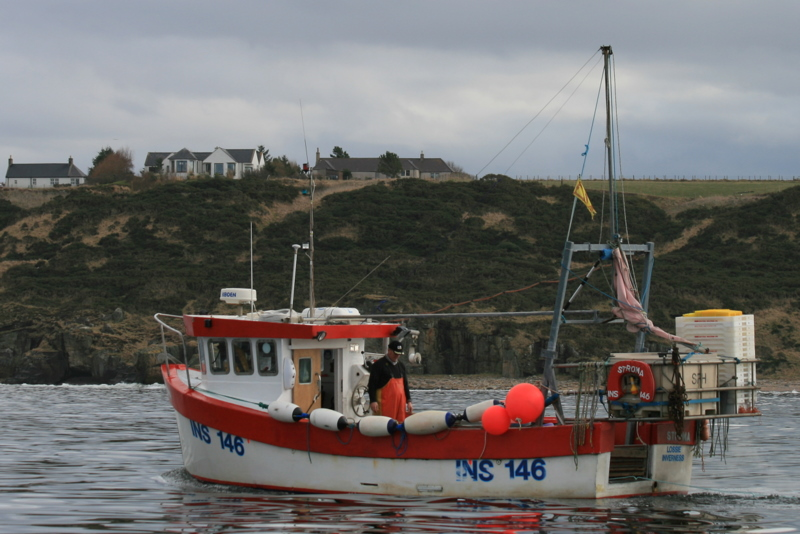
Fishing boat "shooting" a line of creels

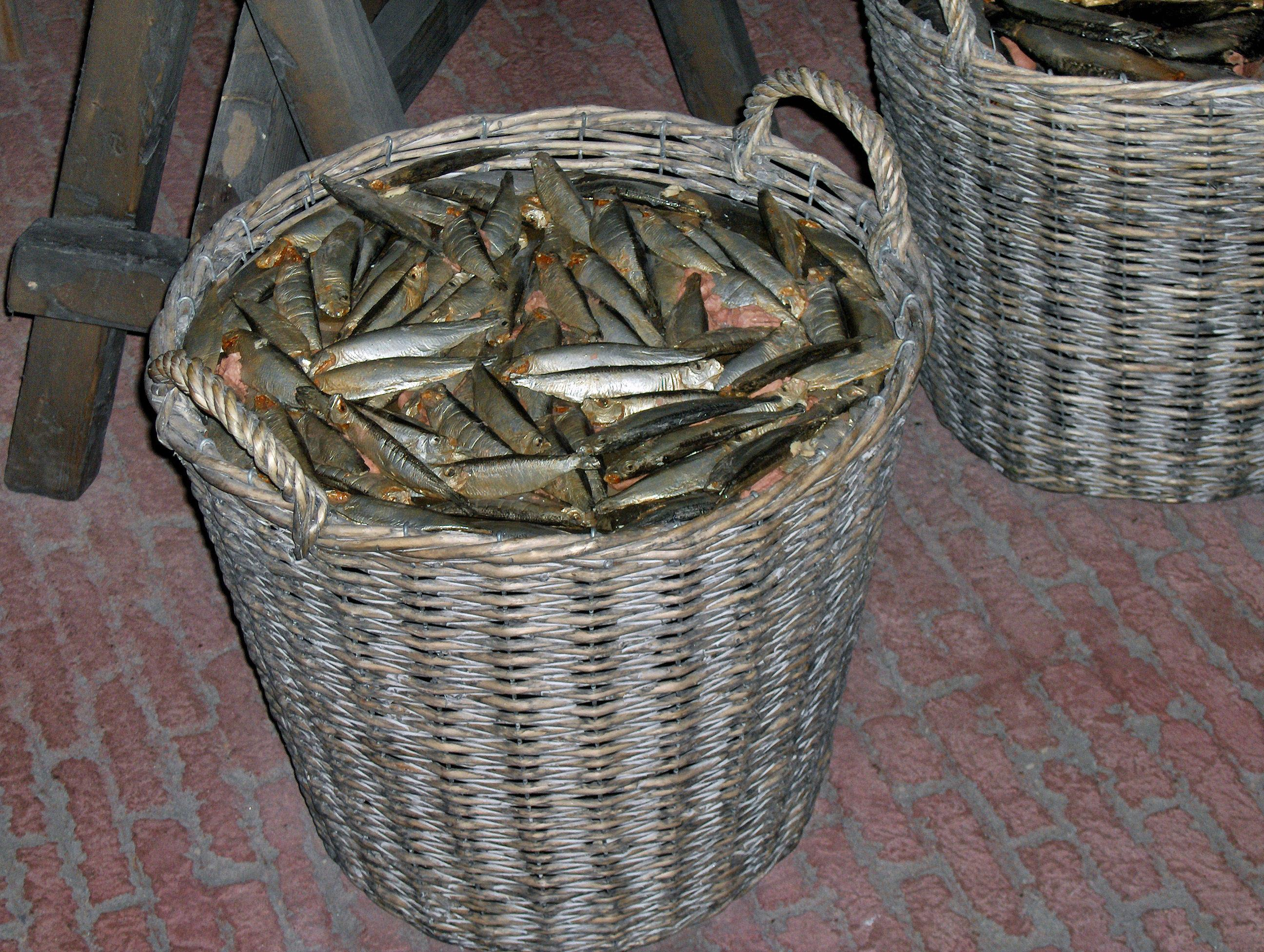
Creel with sprat, National Fishery Museum, Belgium

== See also ==
- Fly fishing
- Weaving (mythology)
- Basket weaving
- Lobster pot
