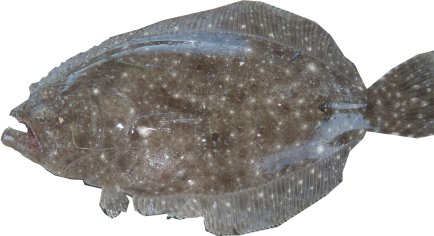

Conservation status
- Least Concern (IUCN 3.1)

Scientific classification
- Domain: Eukaryota
- Kingdom: Animalia
- Phylum: Chordata
- Class: Actinopterygii
- Order: Carangiformes
- Suborder: Pleuronectoidei
- Family: Paralichthyidae
- Genus: Paralichthys
- Species: P. albigutta

Binomial name
- Paralichthys albigutta D. S. Jordan & C. H. Gilbert, 1882

= Gulf flounder =

Species of fish

The Gulf flounder (Paralichthys albigutta) is a species of saltwater flounder.

== Description ==
The Gulf flounder is a flatfish that swims on its side. Their two eyes look upward when swimming. They have sharp teeth, two eyes on their left side, and a white side opposite. Paralichthys albigutta is widely distributed in the Gulf of Mexico and a portion of the western North Atlantic. Adults are found in a variety of habitats, but generally prefer hard, sandy bottoms; juveniles settle in high salinity seagrass beds. Longevity is 7–10 years and females reach maturity between 1 and 2 years. It is commercially and recreationally exploited. The center of abundance of Paralichthys albigutta in the Gulf of Mexico is along its northeastern coast. West of the Mississippi River delta, it occurs in very low numbers. It appears to naturally occur in low abundance in seagrass beds. It is common in museum collections (660 lots). Many species of fishes, including P. albigutta, have experienced declines in abundance in the Northern Gulf of Mexico from 1970 to 2000; although Fodrie et al. (2010) attributed this at least in part to the effects of global rises in sea temperature, there are also a number of other factors (e.g., bycatch in trawl fisheries, increased recreational landings: T. Munroe pers. comm. 2015) that may contribute to these declines. Gill netting has been implicated in the decline of flounder stocks in North Carolina due to targeting of non-reproductive juveniles; however, the population-level effects of this method of harvest on P. albigutta are unknown.

== Habitat ==
This demersal species occurs in shallow depths within estuaries and coastal environments; it is most commonly found on the continental shelf at depths of 18–92 m, but has been collected to about 130 m. It is found in a variety of habitats, including seagrass beds, coastal lagoons, flat hard-bottom and limestone ledges. It prefers hard, sandy bottoms. Juveniles utilize vegetation for habitat or are found adjacent to vegetation in estuaries. Juveniles inhabit high salinity seagrass beds and older adults occur offshore in deeper depths. It undergoes ontogenetic shifts in dietary preference, feeding on amphipods and small crustaceans at small sizes, and feeding primarily on fishes as adults. Adults spend most of the year in bays and estuaries, migrating into deeper offshore waters to spawn during fall and winter (peaking between late October and mid-December). Specimens with ripe gonads have been collected at depths of 20–40 m in the eastern Gulf of Mexico. Larvae migrate inshore during January–February. The age at maturity for females is 1 year (FWRI 2010) with all mature by 2 years and size at 50% maturity is 35–38 cm TL. Males reach maturity between 30 and 35 cm TL. Females grow faster and larger than males. Longevity for males is 8–11 years and females is 7 years (Munroe 2002).

== Fishing ==
They are a common sport fish that can be readily caught with dead fish (such as mullet), live bait, or even artificial or frozen baits such as shrimp or clams. A common way of catching this flounder is by spearfishing or jigging. Commercial fishermen are permitted to take up to 50 lbs of flounder species as by-catch per trip. The Gulf States Marine Fisheries Commission is currently conducting stock assessments for gulf and southern flounder populations in the Gulf of Mexico, which will inform the development of a fishery management plan. This species is commercially and recreationally exploited as a foodfish. It is caught using trawl, gill net, gig, hook-and-line, and trammel net. As with P. lethostigma, this species is harvested using gill nets in estuaries.

== Depth ==
Gulf flounder appear to prefer the ocean floor and camouflage against areas to stealthily strike their prey. This demersal species occurs in shallow depths within estuaries and coastal environments; it is most commonly found on the continental shelf at depths of 18–92 m, but has been collected to about 130 m.

== Threats ==
This is a commercially and recreationally important species, particularly in Florida. It is also taken as by-catch in commercial trawl fisheries, particularly the penaeid shrimp fishery. Seagrass beds have experienced historical declines off Florida, especially in Florida Bay. The large seagrass die-off in Florida Bay between 1987 and 1995 was likely caused by salinity stress, turbidity, and algal blooms. Over that decade, the standing crop of Thalassia testudinum declined by 28%, Halodule wrightii by 92%, and Syringodium filiforme by 88%. Since then, the decline has slowed, but die-off continues to occur. Between 1995 and 2003, turtle and shoal grass abundance increased with improved water clarity and has remained generally stable. Tampa Bay and Sarasota Bay also experienced significant seagrass declines in the 1980s, but has since recovered following the improvement of waste water management. It has been recorded in the diet of the invasive lionfish, which occurs throughout the entire depth range of P. albigutta.
