= Rivière aux Saumons (Ashuapmushuan River tributary) =

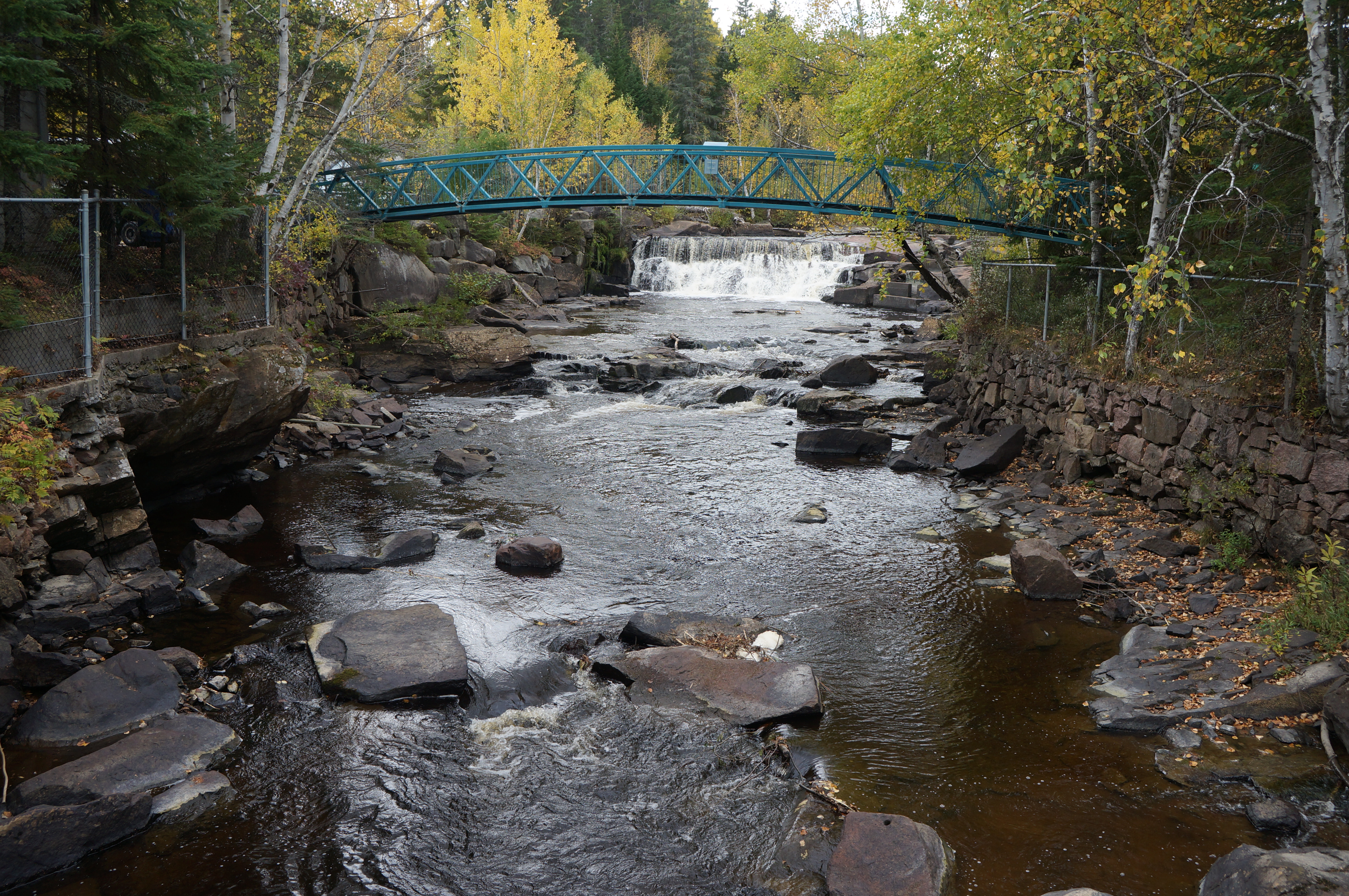

Location
- Country: Canada
- Province: Quebec
- Region: Saguenay–Lac-Saint-Jean
- MRC: Le Domaine-du-Roy Regional County Municipality
- Municipality: Saint-Félicien

Physical characteristics
- Source: Lake Barrois
  - location: Saint-Félicien
  - coordinates: 48°40′54″N 72°34′15″W
  - elevation: 431 m (1,414 ft)
- Mouth: Ashuapmushuan River
  - location: Saint-Félicien
  - coordinates: 48°41′34″N 72°34′15″W
  - elevation: 116 m (381 ft)
- Length: 44.7 km (27.8 mi)

Basin features
- Progression: Ashuapmushuan River, Lac Saint-Jean, Saguenay River
- Tributaries
  - left: (upstream) Discharge from a lake, rivière au Doré, stream, stream from Lac des Portages, stream, stream from Côté, discharge from lakes at Lorenzo and Côté, discharge from a set of lakes including Vert, Marcelin and Marchand, stream, outlet of Creux lake, outlet of a small lake, stream, Vison stream, outlet of Rageot and Vison lakes, outlet of Black Lake, outlet of a small lake, Aulnes stream, outlet of second Fred lake (via Lac Rognon),
  - right: (upstream) Cran stream, Têtu lake outlet, Perdu lake and Petit lac Claire outlet, François stream, Vase and Dallaire outlet, Lachance outlet, Mousse stream, Pied des Chutes stream, stream, Jim lake outlet, Caribou, Clair and Clarvaux lake outlet.

The Rivière aux Saumons is a tributary of Ashuapmushuan River, flowing in the unorganized territory of Lac-Ashuapmushuan and in the municipality of Saint-Félicien, in the Domaine-du-Roy, in the administrative region of Saguenay–Lac-Saint-Jean, in the province of Quebec, in Canada.

The upper part of the Rivière aux Saumons valley is served notably by the Chemin de la Branche-Ouest, the Chemin de la Petite-Rivière, the Chemin de la Rivière-aux-Saumons; the intermediate part is served by several forest roads; the lower part is served by chemin du rang Saint-Paul (route 167), chemin du well, chemin Paul-Émile Tremblay, boulevard du Jardin. While the mouth area is served by the chemin du rang de la Rivière-aux-Saumons.

Apart from an agricultural area in the lower part, forestry (mainly forestry) constitutes the main economic activity in this valley.

The surface of the Salmon River is usually frozen from the beginning of December to the end of March, except the rapids areas; however, safe circulation on the ice is generally from mid-December to mid-March.

== Geography ==
The Rivière aux Saumons rises at the mouth of Lac le Barrois (length: 3.9 km (2.4 mi); altitude: 431 m (1,414 ft)) in a forest area in the unorganized territory of Lac-Ashuapmushuan. This misshapen lake is mainly fed by the Indienne River (coming from the south), the Lerole stream (coming from the west), the outlet of a small lake and the outlet of Lake Shitney. This source is located at:

- 30.52 km (18.96 mi) southwest of downtown Saint-Félicien;
- 38.7 km (24.0 mi) south-west of the mouth of the Ashuapmushuan River;
- 27.3 km (17.0 mi) south-west of the mouth of the Rivière aux Saumons.

From its source, the Salmon River flows over 44.7 km (27.8 mi) with a drop of 315 m (1,033 ft), especially in agricultural and village areas at the end of the route, depending on the segments following:

Upper course of the Salmon River (segment of 24.9 km (15.5 mi))

- 1.8 km (1.1 mi) towards the north-east by collecting the discharge (coming from the south) of lake Alex, crossing on 1.3 km (0.81 mi) lake Rognon (length: 1.6 km (0.99 mi); altitude: 425 m (1,394 ft)), to its mouth;
- 4.1 km (2.5 mi) first towards the northeast to a bend in the river; then southeasterly to Lac à l'Ours; then north-east across this lake (length: 1.7 km (1.1 mi); altitude: 393 m (1,289 ft)) on 0.7 km (0.43 mi), until its mouth. Note: Lac à l'Ours receives upstream (coming from the south-east) the outlet of lakes Caribou, Clair, Clairvaux and Dion;
- 8.9 km (5.5 mi) first towards the northeast, up to the Aulnes stream (coming from the northwest); then east to the Vison stream (coming from the north-west), then south-east by collecting the outlet from Jim's lake (coming from the south), to the Pied des Chutes stream (coming from the west);
- 9.8 km (6.1 mi) towards the east while bending towards the north at the end of the segment, up to the stream at François (coming from the southeast);

Lower course of the Rivière aux Saumons (segment of 20.1 km (12.5 mi))

- 7.1 km (4.4 mi) towards the northwest by collecting the discharge from 4 lakes, by forming a loop towards the east, by collecting the discharge from the lakes at Lorenzo and to Côté, by collecting the stream from the Lake Portages (coming from the west), forming some streamers at the end of the segment, up to a bend in the river;
- 4.8 km (3.0 mi) towards the northeast by crossing the Chemin du Rang Saint-Paul (route 167), forming some streamers, until the confluence of the Doré river (coming from the west);
- 8.2 km (5.1 mi) to the east, collecting the Cran stream (coming from the southwest), forming a loop to the south, along the south side of the Zoo Sauvage de St-Félicien, turning north, bypassing Bernard Island, to its mouth.

The Salmon River flows on the south bank of the Ashuapmushuan River, opposite the Allard Island. This confluence is located at:

- 6.6 km (4.1 mi) northwest of downtown Saint-Félicien;
- 15.5 km (9.6 mi) north-west of the mouth of the Ashuapmushuan River;
- 28.8 km (17.9 mi) northwest of downtown Roberval.

From the mouth of the Rivière aux Saumons, the current descends the course of the Ashuapmushuan river to the southeast on 18 km (11 mi), then crosses Lac Saint-Jean east on 41.1 km (25.5 mi) (ie its full length), follows the course of the Saguenay River via the Petite Décharge on 172.3 km (107.1 mi) eastwards to Tadoussac where it merges with the estuary of Saint Lawrence.

== Toponymy ==
The toponym "Rivière aux Saumons" was formalized on December 5, 1968, at the Place Names Bank of the Commission de toponymie du Québec.

== See also ==
- Lac Saint-Jean, a body of water
- Saguenay River, a stream
- List of rivers of Quebec
