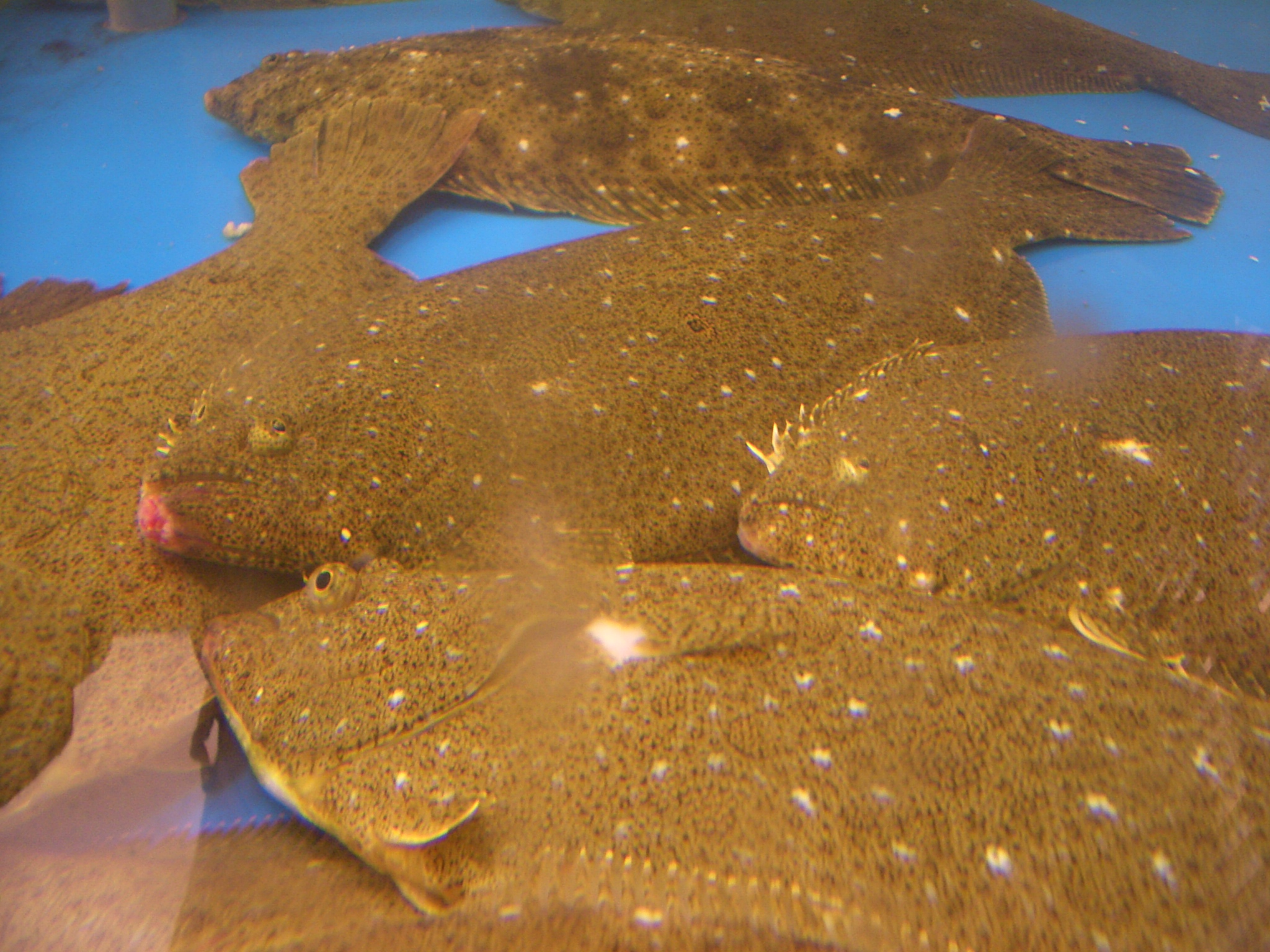
- Bastard Halibut (P. olivaceus)

Scientific classification
- Kingdom: Animalia
- Phylum: Chordata
- Class: Actinopterygii
- Order: Carangiformes
- Suborder: Pleuronectoidei
- Family: Paralichthyidae
- Genus: Paralichthys; Girard, 1858

Type species
- Pleuronectes maculosus Girard 1854

= Paralichthys =

Paralichthys Temporal range: Middle Miocene–present

Genus of fishes

Paralichthys is a genus of large-tooth flounders. Most species are native to the coastal waters of the Americas, but P. olivaceus is from northeast Asia. The largest species reaches about 1.5 m (5 ft) in length.

== Species ==
There are currently almost 20 species in this genus:

- Paralichthys adspersus (Steindachner, 1867) (Fine flounder)
- Paralichthys aestuarius C. H. Gilbert & Scofield, 1898 (Cortez flounder)
- Paralichthys albigutta D. S. Jordan & C. H. Gilbert, 1882 (Gulf flounder)
- Paralichthys brasiliensis (Ranzani, 1842) (Brazilian flounder)
- Paralichthys californicus (Ayres, 1859) (California flounder)
- Paralichthys delfini Pequeño & Plaza, 1987
- Paralichthys dentatus (Linnaeus, 1766) (Summer flounder)
- Paralichthys fernandezianus Steindachner, 1903
- Paralichthys isosceles D. S. Jordan, 1891
- Paralichthys lethostigma D. S. Jordan & C. H. Gilbert, 1884 (Southern flounder)
- Paralichthys microps (Günther, 1881)
- Paralichthys olivaceus (Temminck & Schlegel, 1846) (Bastard halibut)
- Paralichthys orbignyanus (Valenciennes, 1839)
- Paralichthys patagonicus D. S. Jordan, 1889 (Patagonian flounder)
- Paralichthys squamilentus D. S. Jordan & C. H. Gilbert, 1882 (Broad flounder)
- Paralichthys triocellatus A. Miranda-Ribeiro, 1903
- Paralichthys tropicus Ginsburg, 1933 (Tropical flounder)
- Paralichthys woolmani D. S. Jordan & T. M. Williams, 1897 (Speckled flounder)

Two fossil species are also known:

- †Paralichthys antiquus David, 1943 (Late Miocene of California, USA)
- †Paralichthys yamanai Sakamoto & Uyeno, 1993 (Middle Miocene of Japan)

The American four-spot flounder Hippoglossina oblonga is sometimes placed in Paralichthys by some authorities but FishBase does not and that source is followed here.
