= Rivière du Cran =

Rivière du Cran Old name: "Michipu River"

Location
- Country: Canada
- Province: Quebec
- Region: Saguenay–Lac-Saint-Jean
- Regional County Municipality: Le Domaine-du-Roy Regional County Municipality

Physical characteristics
- Source: Lac des Jaseurs
  - location: Lac-Ashuapmushuan
  - coordinates: 48°45′52″N 73°13′37″W
  - elevation: 530 m (1,740 ft)
- Mouth: Ashuapmushuan River
  - location: Lac-Ashuapmushuan
  - coordinates: 48°52′13″N 72°50′16″W
  - elevation: 188 m (617 ft)
- Length: 69.7 km (43.3 mi)

Basin features
- Progression: Ashuapmushuan River, Lac Saint-Jean, Saguenay River, Saint Lawrence River
- Tributaries
  - left: (upstream) discharge from Lake Linteau, discharge from Lake Lebreux, stream, discharge from Lake Louvetot, stream Madame, 2 streams, discharge from Lakes Lubine and Oculus, stream from Plover, stream, discharge from Lakes Salice and Lanouette, stream, discharge from a set lakes including Tison, Diane, Arel, Dutau, stream, outlet of Lac Laton, outlet of Lake Douley.
  - right: (upstream) Carpe stream, outlet of Lac Desjarlais, outlet of Draveil and Menetou lakes, stream, outlet of some lakes including Cantara and Pessey, outlet of Auchel lake, 3 streams, outlet of some lakes, 2 streams, Antoine stream, outlet of Boomerang lake, 2 streams, discharge from Lake Moos, 2 discharge from lakes, discharge from Lake Morrons.

The Rivière du Cran (English: Cran River) is a tributary of Ashuapmushuan River, flowing in the unorganized territory of Lac-Ashuapmushuan and in the municipality of La Doré, in the Le Domaine-du-Roy Regional County Municipality, in the administrative region of Saguenay–Lac-Saint-Jean, in the province of Quebec, in Canada.

The Cran river valley is mainly served by forest roads which connect north to the route 167.

Forestry (mainly forestry) is the main economic activity in this valley; recreational tourism activities, second, main because of the Ashuapmushuan Wildlife Reserve.

== Geography ==
The Cran river originates at the mouth of Lac des Jaseurs (length: 0.6 km (0.37 mi) of triangular shape; altitude: 530 m (1,740 ft)). Lac des Jaseuers is encased between mountains in a forest area.

The mouth of Lac des Jaseurs is located in a forest zone in the unorganized territory of Lac-Ashuapmushuan, at:

- 3.8 km (2.4 mi) south of a curve of the Vermillon River;
- 31 km (19 mi) south-west of the mouth of the Cran river
- 30.0 km (18.6 mi) south-west of the old Cran station along the railway;
- 24.8 km (15.4 mi) south-west of the course of the Ashuapmushuan River.

From the mouth of Lac des Jaseurs, the Cran River flows over 69.7 km (43.3 mi) with a drop of 342 m (1,122 ft), especially in agricultural and village areas at the end of route, according to the following segments:

- 3.7 km (2.3 mi) south-east crossing Lac Becquerel (length: 1.2 km (0.75 mi); altitude: 522 m (1,713 ft)), then south -is across Lake Merlin (length: 1.7 km (1.1 mi); altitude: 515 m (1,690 ft)), to its mouth;
- 10.1 km (6.3 mi) towards the southeast relatively in a straight line in a deep valley, crossing Lac Buzet, collecting the discharge (coming from the northeast) of Lac Laton, crossing at the end of segment of Pony Lake (length: 1.7 km (1.1 mi); altitude: 488 m (1,601 ft)), to its mouth;
- 2.7 km (1.7 mi) first towards the south-east across Lac Lafrance (length: 1.6 km (0.99 mi); altitude: 486 m (1,594 ft)), then the Lac du Mâle (length: 1.2 km (0.75 mi); altitude: 485 m (1,591 ft)), to its mouth;
- 20.1 km (12.5 mi) to the north (slightly to the east), relatively in a straight line (occasionally forming small streamers) in a deep valley, collecting the Antoine stream (coming from the south-east), by collecting the discharge (coming from the northwest) from lakes Salice and Lanouette, up to the stream of Pluvier (coming from the west);
- 6.6 km (4.1 mi) to the north, by forming a hook towards the east, bypassing a mountain (altitude: 494 m (1,621 ft)), up to a bend in the river;
- 12.6 km (7.8 mi) to the east bypassing a mountain and forming a loop to the south, then to the north by forming a hook to the east, collecting the Madame stream (coming from the northwest ), to a bend in the river, corresponding to the outlet (coming from the west) of Lac Louvetot;
- 9.3 km (5.8 mi) to the east along more or less the Canadian National railway, relatively in a straight line in a deep valley, to a bend of the river, corresponding to the discharge (coming from the east) from Carpe Creek;
- 4.6 km (2.9 mi) towards the north in a deep valley, and relatively in a straight line, until its mouth.

The Cran river flows on the southwest bank of the Ashuapmushuan River. This confluence is located upstream of five series of rapids including the Little fall at the Bear and the Great fall at the Bear, and at:

- 37.8 km (23.5 mi) north-west of downtown Saint-Félicien;
- 46.7 km (29.0 mi) north-west of the mouth of the Ashuapmushuan river.

From the mouth of the Cran river, the current descends the course of the Ashuapmushuan river on 59.8 km (37.2 mi), then crosses Lake Saint-Jean east on 41.1 km (25.5 mi) (its full length), follows the course of the Saguenay river via the Petite Décharge on 172.3 km (107.1 mi) eastwards to Tadoussac where it merges with the estuary of Saint Lawrence.

== Toponymy ==
In French, the word "Cran" means "rock cap". This word is mainly use by people in the region of Lac Saint-Jean.

The toponym "Rivière du Cran" was formalized on December 5, 1968, at the Place Names Bank of the Commission de toponymie du Québec.

== See also ==
- List of rivers of Quebec
