= Flounder =

Group of flatfish species

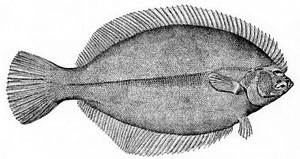
Winter flounder, Pseudopleuronectes americanus

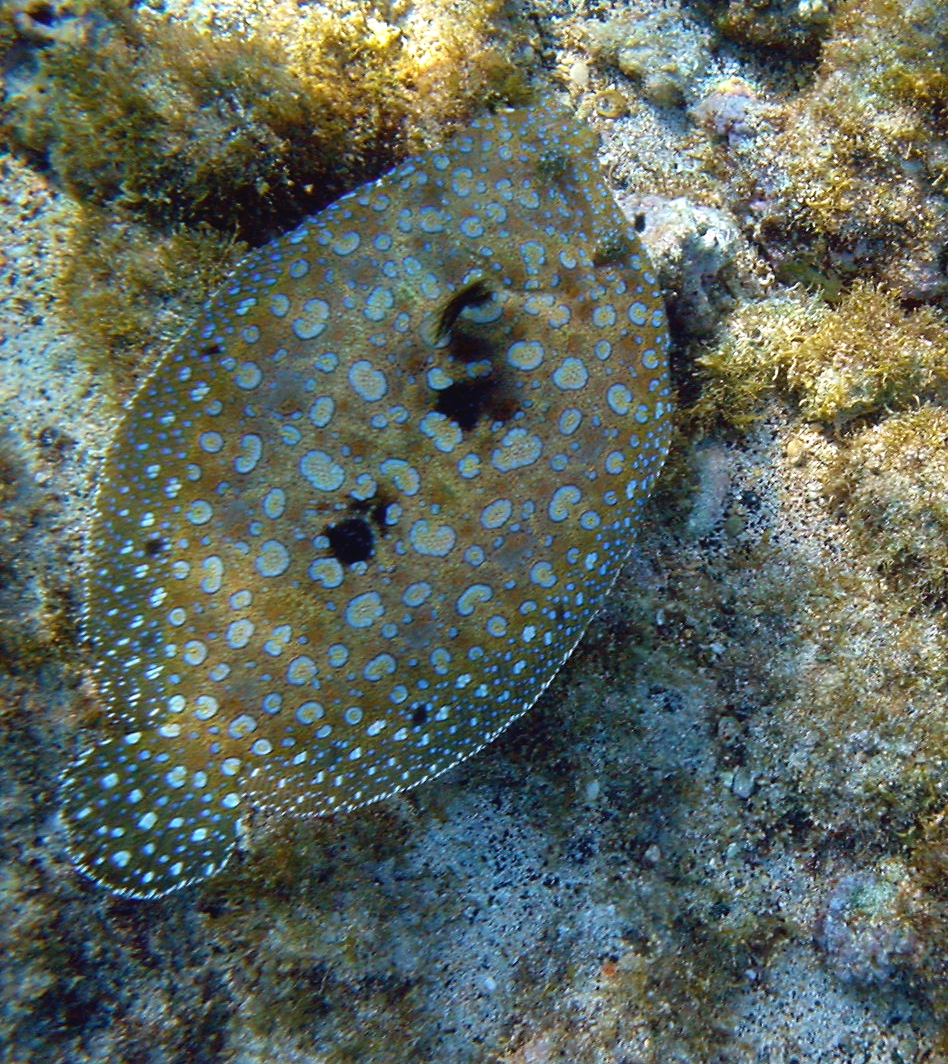
Flowery flounder, Bothus mancus, Bahía de la Chiva, at Hawaii

Flounders are a group of flatfish species. They are demersal fish, found at the bottom of oceans around the world; some species will also enter estuaries.

== Taxonomy ==
The name "flounder" is used for several only distantly related species, though all are in the suborder Pleuronectoidei (families Achiropsettidae, Bothidae, Pleuronectidae, Paralichthyidae, and Samaridae). Some of the better known species that are important in fisheries are:

- Western Atlantic
  - Gulf flounder – Paralichthys albigutta
  - Southern flounder – Paralichthys lethostigma
  - Summer flounder (also known as fluke) – Paralichthys dentatus
  - Winter flounder – Pseudopleuronectes americanus
- European waters
  - European flounder – Platichthys flesus
  - Witch flounder – Glyptocephalus cynoglossus
- North Pacific
  - Halibut – Hippoglossus stenolepis
  - Olive flounder – Paralichthys olivaceus

== Eye migration ==
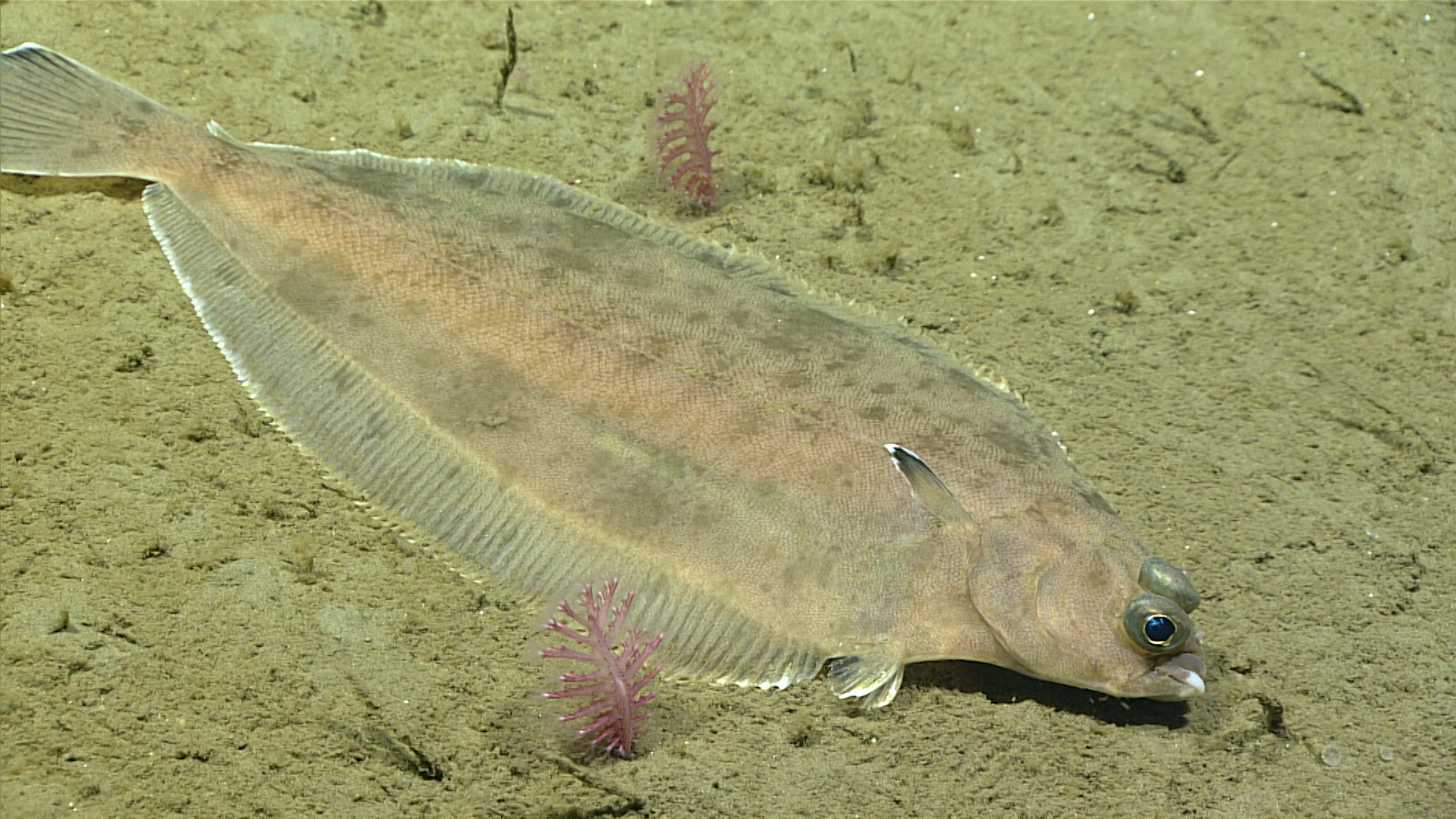
An adult flounder with both eyes migrated to its right, upward-facing side

Larval flounder are born with one eye on each side of their head, but as they grow from the larval to juvenile stage through metamorphosis, one eye migrates to the other side of the body. As a result, both eyes are then on the side which faces up. The side to which the eyes migrate is dependent on the species type. As an adult, a flounder changes its habits and camouflages itself by lying on the bottom of the ocean floor as protection against predators.

== Habitat ==
Flounders ambush their prey, feeding at soft muddy areas of the sea bottom, near bridge piles, docks, and coral reefs.

A flounder's diet consists mainly of fish spawn, crustaceans, polychaetes and small fish. Flounder typically grow to a length of 22–60 centimeters (8 1/2–23 1/2 in), and as large as 95 centimeters (37 in). Their width is about half their length. Male Platichthys have been found up to 130 kilometres (70 nautical miles) off the coast of northern Sardinia, sometimes with heavy encrustations of various species of barnacle.

== Threats ==
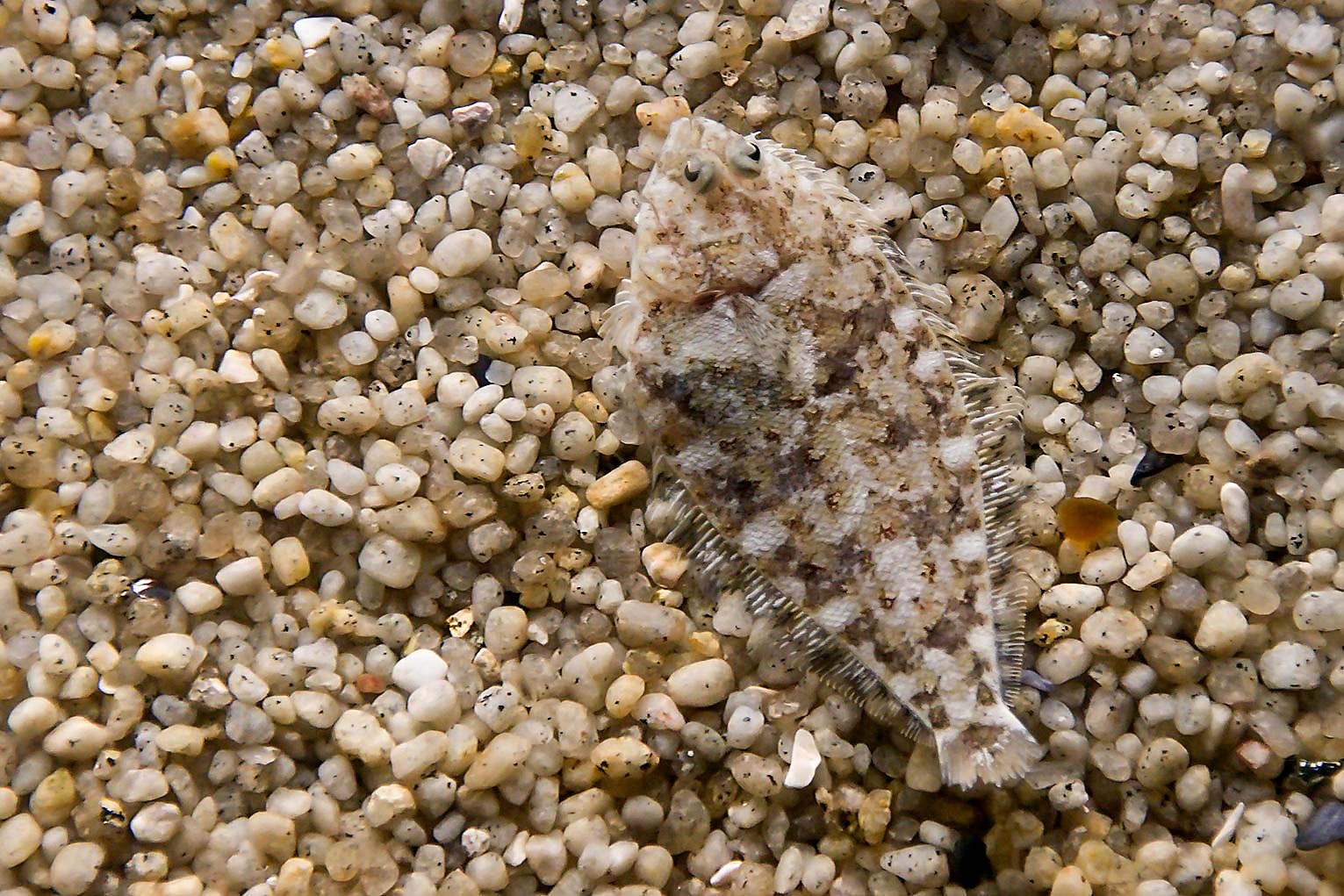
A flounder blending into its environment

World stocks of large predatory fish and large ground fish, including sole and flounder, were estimated in 2003 to be only about 10% of pre-industrial levels, largely due to overfishing. Most overfishing is due to the extensive activities of the fishing industry. Current estimates suggest that approximately 30 million flounder (excluding sole) are alive in the world today. In the Gulf of Mexico, along the coast of Texas, research indicates the flounder population could be as low as 15 million due to heavy overfishing and industrial pollution.
