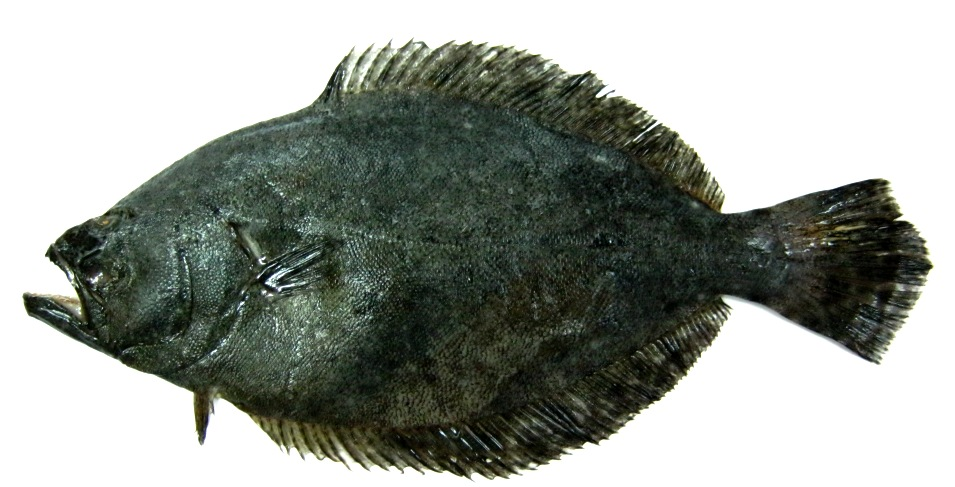

Conservation status
- Least Concern (IUCN 3.1)

Scientific classification
- Kingdom: Animalia
- Phylum: Chordata
- Class: Actinopterygii
- Order: Carangiformes
- Suborder: Pleuronectoidei
- Family: Paralichthyidae
- Genus: Paralichthys
- Species: P. adspersus

Binomial name
- Paralichthys adspersus (Steindachner, 1867)

Synonyms
- Hippoglossus kingii Jenyns, 1842; Pseudorhombus adspersus Steindachner, 1867

= Paralichthys adspersus =

Species of fish

Paralichthys adspersus, the fine flounder, is a species of large-tooth flounder native to the eastern Pacific Ocean, along the continental shelf from the coast of Ecuador in the north to the coast of Peru in the south.

It is a medium-sized flatfish, growing up to 70 cm in length, with females typically being larger than males. It is a game fish, caught by an artisanal fishery off the Peruvian coast.

The species is a predator, feeding off smaller fishes in its habitat.

Paralichthys adspersus was first collected by Charles Darwin in the Galapagos Islands and was described in 1842 as Hippoglossus kingii, which would have placed it in the left-eye flounder family. However, the description of H. kingii has been determined to lack sufficient information to absolutely determine which species it describes and is thus considered ambiguous and therefore is not valid.
