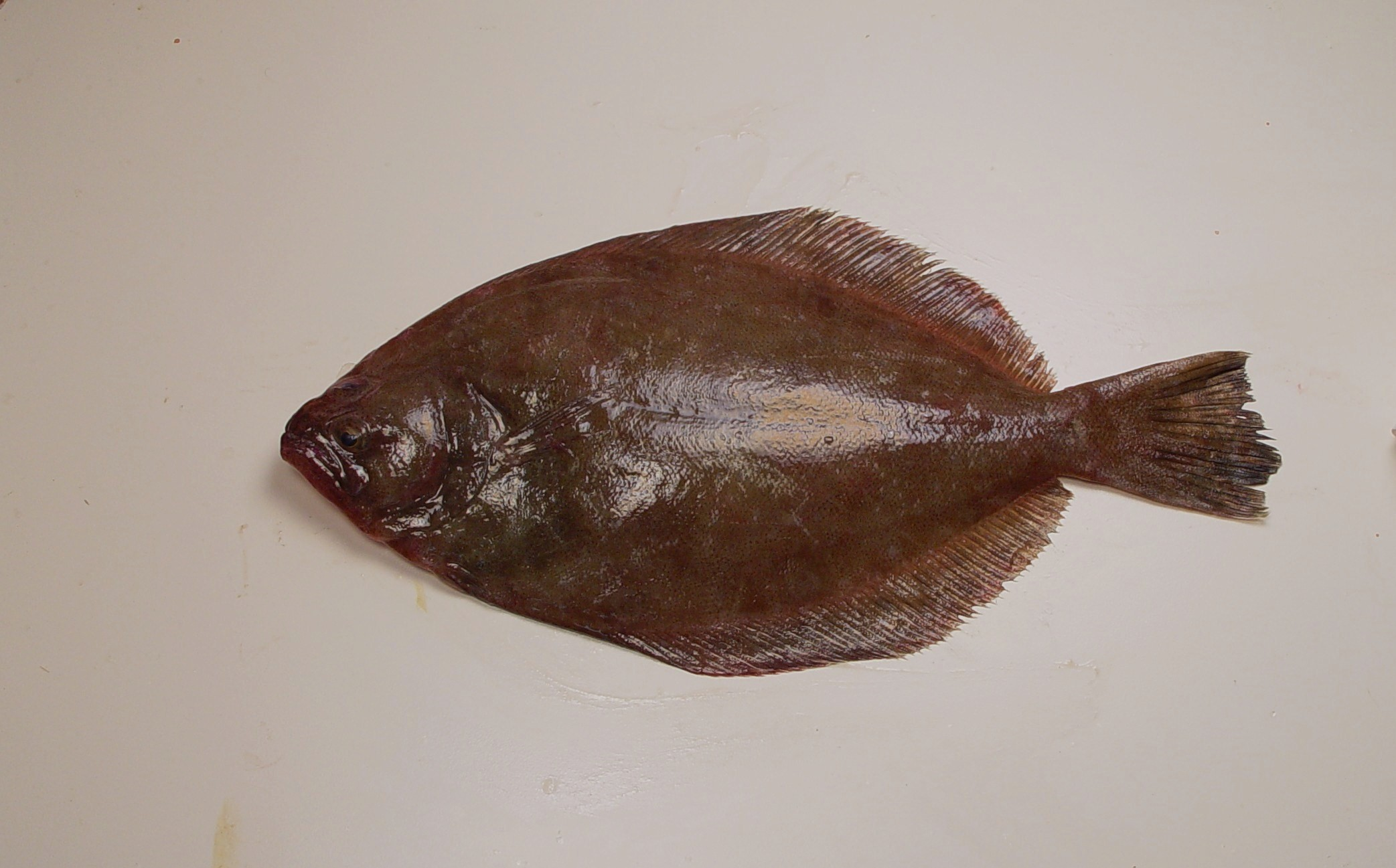

Conservation status
- Near Threatened (IUCN 3.1)

Scientific classification
- Kingdom: Animalia
- Phylum: Chordata
- Class: Actinopterygii
- Order: Carangiformes
- Suborder: Pleuronectoidei
- Family: Paralichthyidae
- Genus: Paralichthys
- Species: P. lethostigma

Binomial name
- Paralichthys lethostigma D. S. Jordan & C. H. Gilbert, 1884

= Paralichthys lethostigma =

Southern flounder

Species of fish

Paralichthys lethostigma, the southern flounder, is a species of large-tooth flounder native to the East Coast of the United States and the northern Gulf of Mexico. It is a popular sport fish and is the largest and most commercially valuable flounder in the western North Atlantic Ocean and Gulf of Mexico. It is a "left-eyed flounder", meaning the left side is pigmented and is the "up side".

== Description ==
The body color is brown with diffuse, unocellated spots and blotches. This species typically grows to around 12–14 inches (30–36 cm) in length.

== Diet ==
Larval and postlarval southern flounder feed on zooplankton. As a juvenile, the southern flounder's diet consists of small invertebrates, shifting to larger invertebrates and fish as the flounder reaches adult size. Southern flounder feed on the bottom of the ocean and in the water column, and are considered to be near-top predators in their benthic environment.

== Habitat ==
Adult fish breed and spend the warmer season in coastal embayments and nearshore shelf waters, where the eggs develop until they are late stage larvae, which are then pushed by currents into the estuaries where the fish settle into the sediment and grow into juveniles. The juveniles stay in the estuaries until they reach sexual maturity and leave to spawn.

The southern flounder can survive in low salinity and has even been found in freshwater habitats both as a juvenile and as an adult.

== Reproduction and life cycle ==
Juvenile southern flounder stay in estuaries, and most leave to spawn offshore during the fall and winter as adults. Young fish are eventually pushed into the estuaries by ocean currents to mature. Southern flounder reach sexual maturity around two years of age. Older, larger fish tend to begin the spawning migration earlier. Female fish both grow faster and live longer than males.

The annual growth cycle of the southern flounder starts in the spring and ends in the fall as the water temperature decreases. Males live for around 5 years, and females live for around 7–8 years.

== Distribution ==
The southern flounder is distributed along the East Coast of the United States, north to North Carolina, and along the northern Gulf of Mexico, south to Tuxpan, but is not found in far southern Florida or the Florida Keys. A single specimen was reported in 2015 in the Mediterranean Sea off Israel, a likely escapee from mariculture.

This species is listed by the IUCN as near threatened due to both commercial and recreational overfishing, and mortality from the shrimp trawl industry. This species is also affected by habitat destruction from human causes.

== Importance to humans ==
Southern flounders are a major and valuable species in the highly important commercial and recreational flounder fishery in the Gulf of Mexico. Most of the commercial catch in the Gulf of Mexico is incidental to the catch by shrimp trawlers. Recreationally, they can easily be caught by anglers on a line with either a lure or live bait. Another, riskier way of collecting flounders is night gigging. Waders use a gig, or a multi-pronged spear, to impale fish after using a flashlight to spot them in the water at night. This practice is very hazardous due to the possibility of stepping on submerged sharp objects or of impaling dangerous stingrays, which also frequent shallow waters and may be mistaken for flounder.

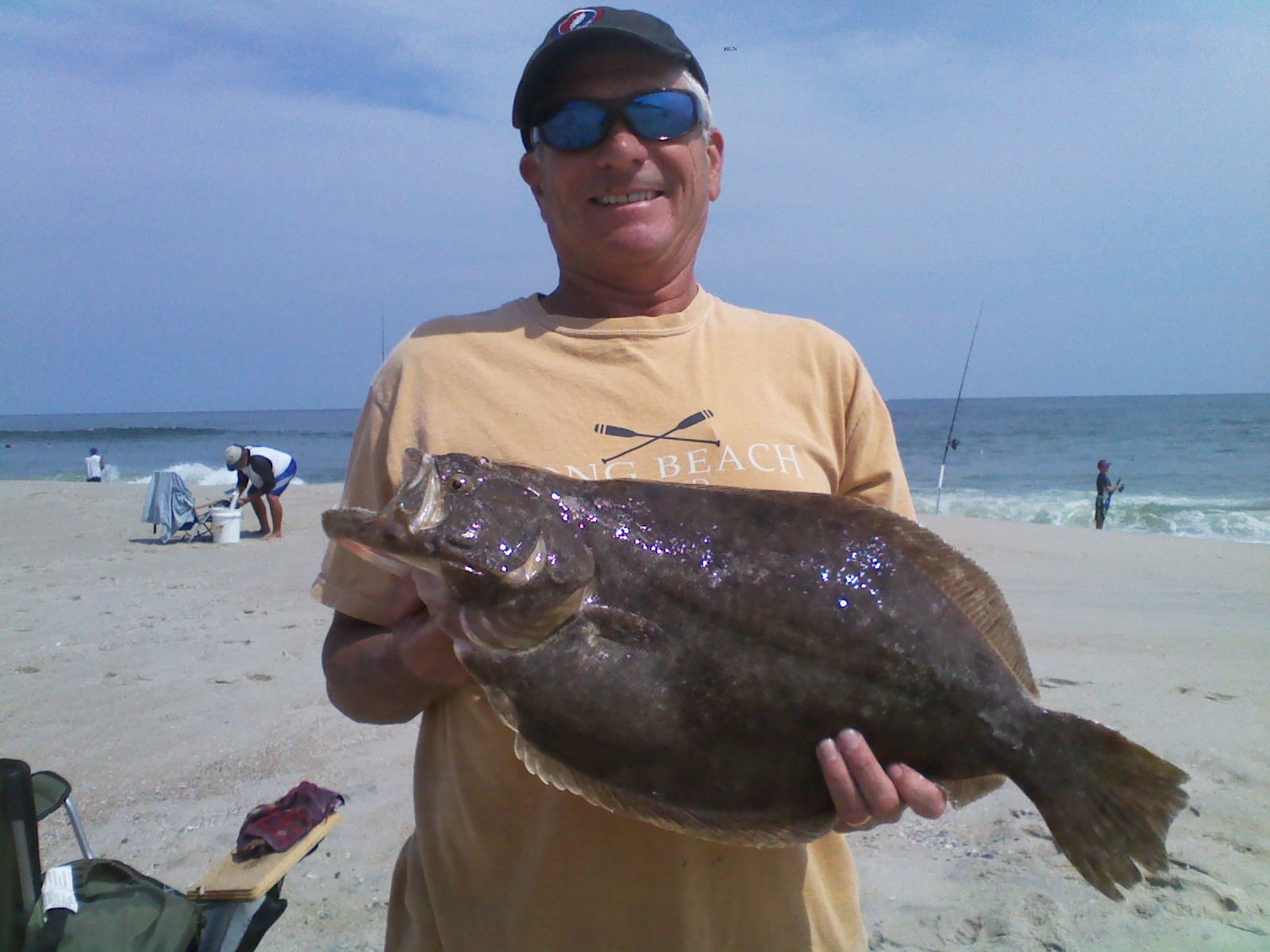
Southern flounder caught in New Jersey by an angler

Southern flounder are also considered valuable as an aquaculture species because of their ability to live in water of varying salinities. Research has been conducted on using soy based protein sources rather than fish meal to grow the fish to reduce environmental impact.

== Etymology ==
The genus name, Paralichthys, is usually interpreted as "parallel fish" in reference to the deeply compressed body shape. However, some interpret it as "close to the sea", from the Greek word, para, meaning beside or near. This can be in reference to the way it buries itself in the sand and lies flat as if it is a part of the sea floor itself. The species name, lethostigma, comes from the Latin word, letho, meaning death, and the Greek word, stigma, meaning spots. The meaning "forgotten spots" or "death of spots" refers to the absence of conspicuous large ocelli (pigmented scaled areas that look like eyes) that are common in other species of flatfish.

== See also ==
- Southern flounder, a family of species known as "southern flounders"
- Flatfish
- Lefteye flounder, the former family of the southern flounder, Bothidae
- Paralichthyidae, the current family of the southern flounder
