= Cran (unit) =

Measure of landed herring

A cran, in use from at least as early as the 18th century, was a unit of measure of landed uncleaned herring used in the North Sea fishing industry. In 1852 it was defined to be the equivalent of one standard box of about 37.5 imperial gallons - typically around 1200 fish, but varying anywhere between 700 and 2500. In metric units it is about 170.5 litres.

The word is from Scottish Gaelic crann, meaning "lot, measure of herring, tree".
