= La Doré =

- Parish municipality
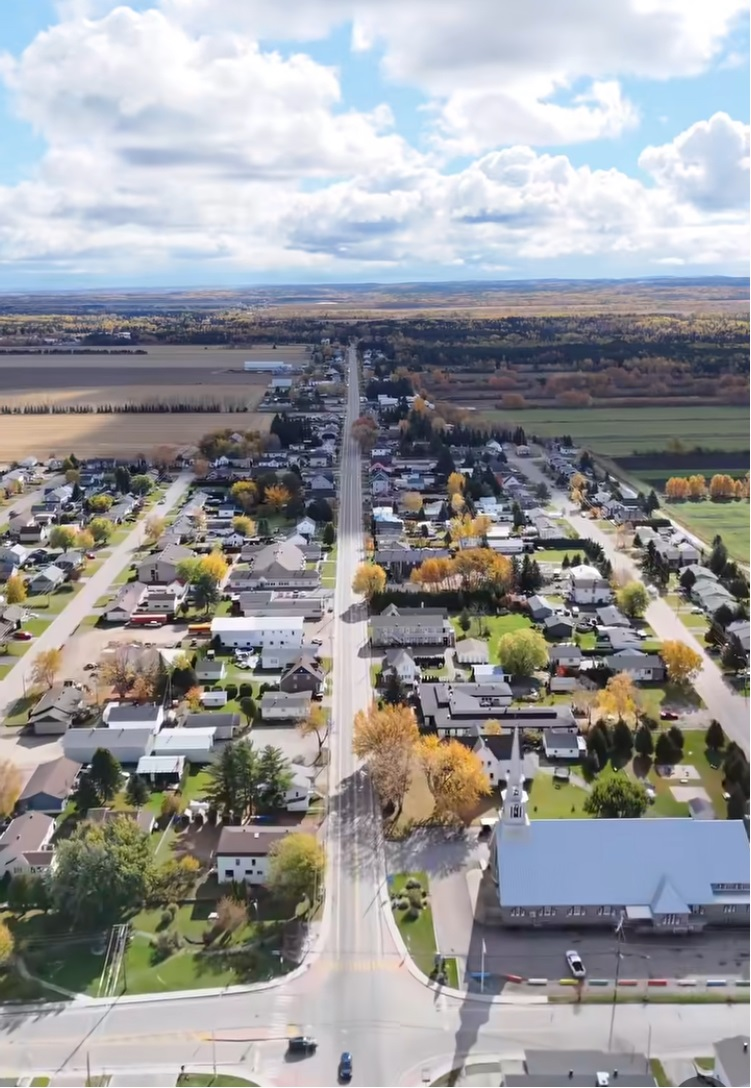
- Aerial view of La Doré

- Coat of arms

- Location in Saguenay–Lac-Saint-Jean Quebec
- Coordinates: 48°43′N 72°39′W
- Country: Canada
- Province: Quebec
- Region: Saguenay–Lac-Saint-Jean
- RCM: Le Domaine-du-Roy
- Settled: 1889
- Constituted: March 16, 1906

Government
  - Mayor: Ghislain Laprise
  - Federal riding: Lac-Saint-Jean
  - Prov. riding: Roberval

Area
  - Total: 297.10 km^{2} (114.71 sq mi)
  - Land: 288.55 km^{2} (111.41 sq mi)

Population (2021)
  - Total: 1,359
  - Density: 4.7/km^{2} (12/sq mi)
  - Pop (2016–21): ▼0.4%
  - Dwellings: 654
- Time zone: UTC−5 (EST)
  - Summer (DST): UTC−4 (EDT)
- Postal code(s): G8J 1E8
- Area codes: 418 and 581
- Highways: R-167
- Website: ladore.ca

La Doré (French pronunciation: [la dɔʁe]; known as Notre-Dame-de-la-Doré before 1983) is a parish municipality in Quebec, Canada, in the regional county municipality of Le Domaine-du-Roy and the administrative region of Saguenay–Lac-Saint-Jean.

It is located along the banks of the Sauger River (Rivière au Doré), between the Ashuapmushuan River and the Laurentian Mountains to the south, in the geographic township of Dufferin.

== History ==
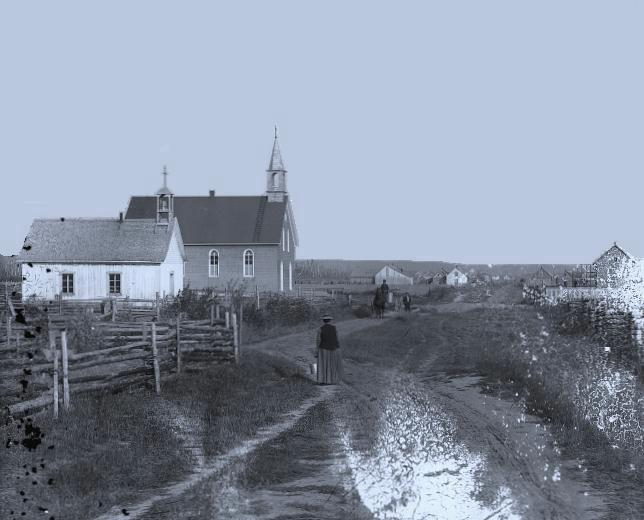
La Doré in 1903

In 1882, the Mission of Notre-Dame-de-la-Visitation-de-la-Doré was established. The village got its real start in 1889 when settlers from Saint-Méthode, Saint-Félicien, Saint-Prime, and Lambton settled there and founded the Colony of Rivière-au-Doré. In 1891, it was for a large part destroyed by fire, but was rebuilt due to the courage and determination of the pioneers. The next year the Rivière-au-Doré Post Office opened.

In 1904, the mission gained the status of parish, and two years later in 1906, it was incorporated as the Parish Municipality of Saint-Félicien-Partie-Nord-Ouest. In 1915, it changed its name to Notre-Dame-de-la-Doré, and in 1983, it was changed again to the abbreviated form La Doré, because of its widespread common use.

== Demographics ==
In the 2021 Census of Population conducted by Statistics Canada, La Doré had a population of 1,359 living in 610 of its 654 total private dwellings, a change of −0.4% from its 2016 population of 1,365. With a land area of 288.55 km^{2} (111.41 sq mi), it had a population density of 4.7/km^{2} (12.2/sq mi) in 2021.

Population trend:

- Population in 2021: 1,359 (2016 to 2021 population change: -0.4%)
- Population in 2016: 1,365
- Population in 2011: 1,453
- Population in 2006: 1,454
- Population in 2001: 1,553
- Population in 1996: 1,624
- Population in 1991: 1,668
- Population in 1986: 1,851
- Population in 1981: 1,880
- Population in 1976: 1,911
- Population in 1971: 2,058
- Population in 1966: 2,264
- Population in 1961: 2,276
- Population in 1956: 2,068
- Population in 1951: 1,883
- Population in 1941: 1,301
- Population in 1931: 1,106
- Population in 1921: 972
- Population in 1911: 607

Mother tongue:

- English as first language: 0.4%
- French as first language: 99.3%
- English and French as first language: 0%
- Other as first language: 0.4%

== Arts and culture ==
La Doré holds an annual truck festival, the Festival des camionneurs de La Doré, which took place for the first time in the summer of 1981. In 1991, the festival organizers decided to establish a snowmobile festival in January, the Rally des Loups de La Doré, which is now a snow-cross competition sanctioned by the SCM.

== Attractions ==
The municipality also includes one of the oldest water-powered sawmills still operating in Quebec. The Moulin des Pionniers, from circa 1904, is a major tourist attraction and historic site for the village and region.
