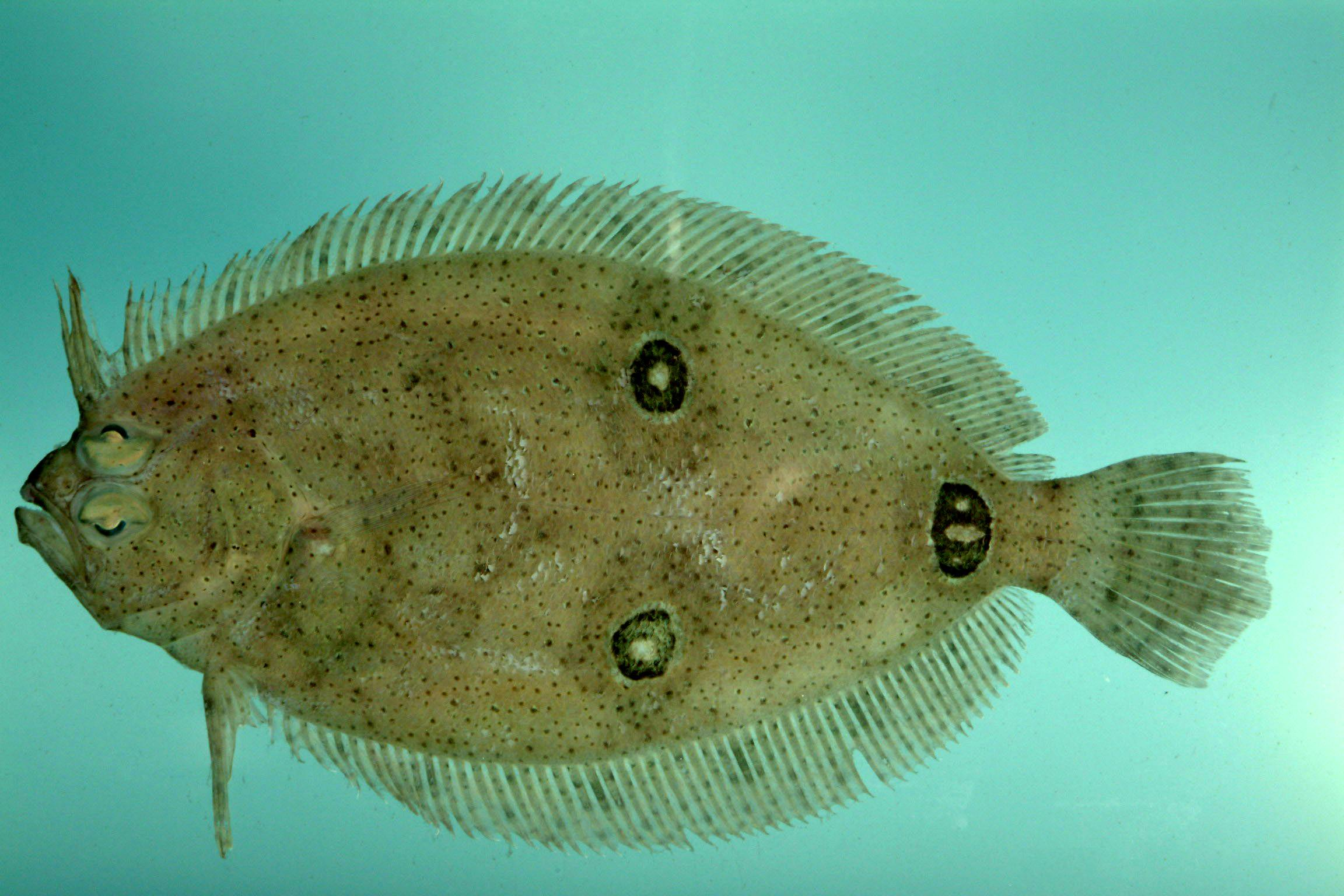

Conservation status
- Least Concern (IUCN 3.1)

Scientific classification
- Kingdom: Animalia
- Phylum: Chordata
- Class: Actinopterygii
- Order: Carangiformes
- Suborder: Pleuronectoidei
- Family: Paralichthyidae
- Genus: Ancylopsetta
- Species: A. dilecta

Binomial name
- Ancylopsetta dilecta (Goode & T. H. Bean, 1883)

Synonyms
- Notosema dilecta Goode & Bean, 1883

= Ancylopsetta dilecta =

Species of fish

Ancylopsetta dilecta, the three-eye flounder, is a species of large-tooth flounder found along the Atlantic and Caribbean coasts of North and Central America. It is found down to depths of 137 m (449 ft). This species grows to 25 cm (9.8 in) in total length.
