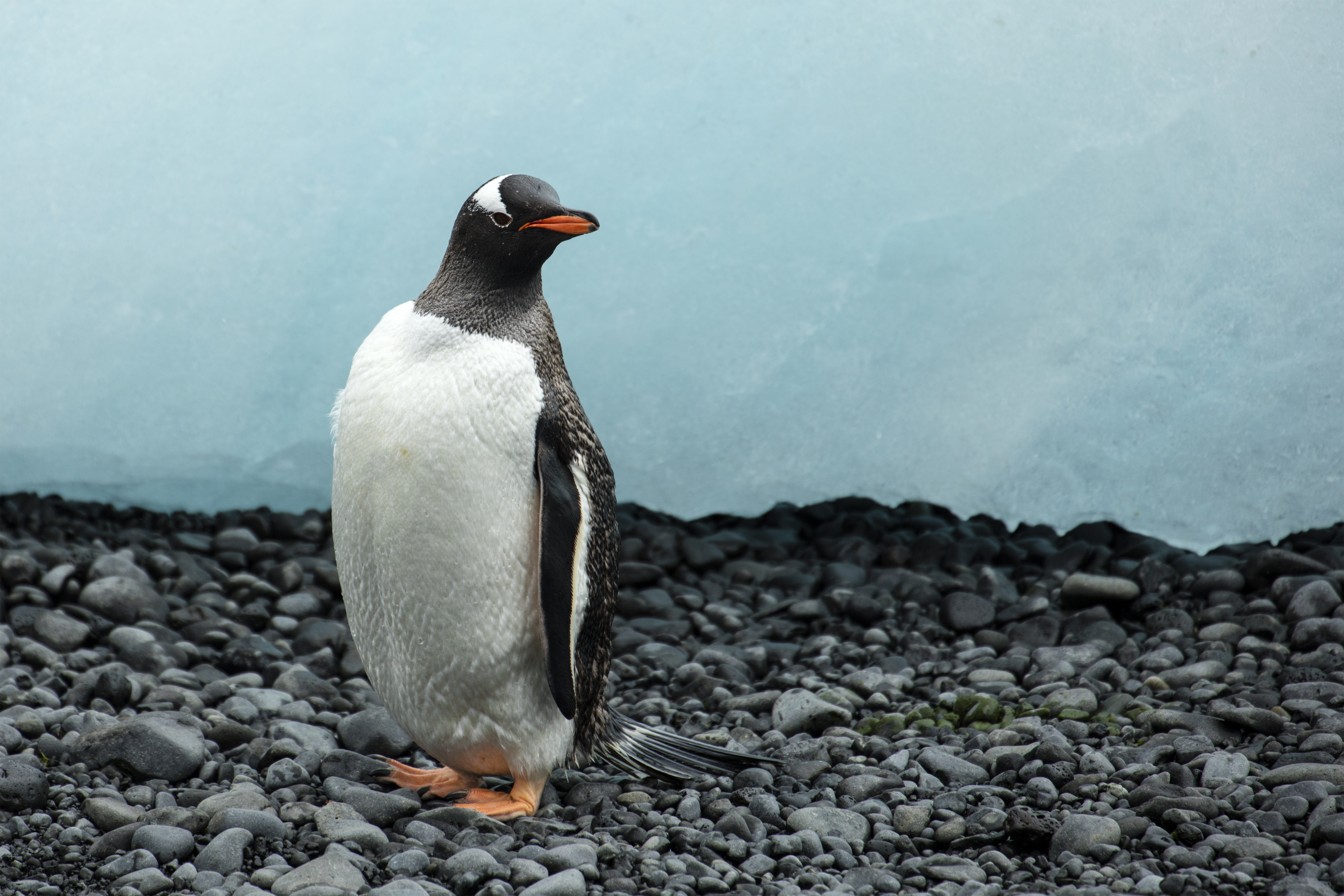
- At Brown Bluff, Tabarin Peninsula

Conservation status
- Least Concern (IUCN 3.1)

Scientific classification
- Kingdom: Animalia
- Phylum: Chordata
- Class: Aves
- Order: Sphenisciformes
- Family: Spheniscidae
- Genus: Pygoscelis
- Species: P. papua

Binomial name
- Pygoscelis papua (Forster, 1781)
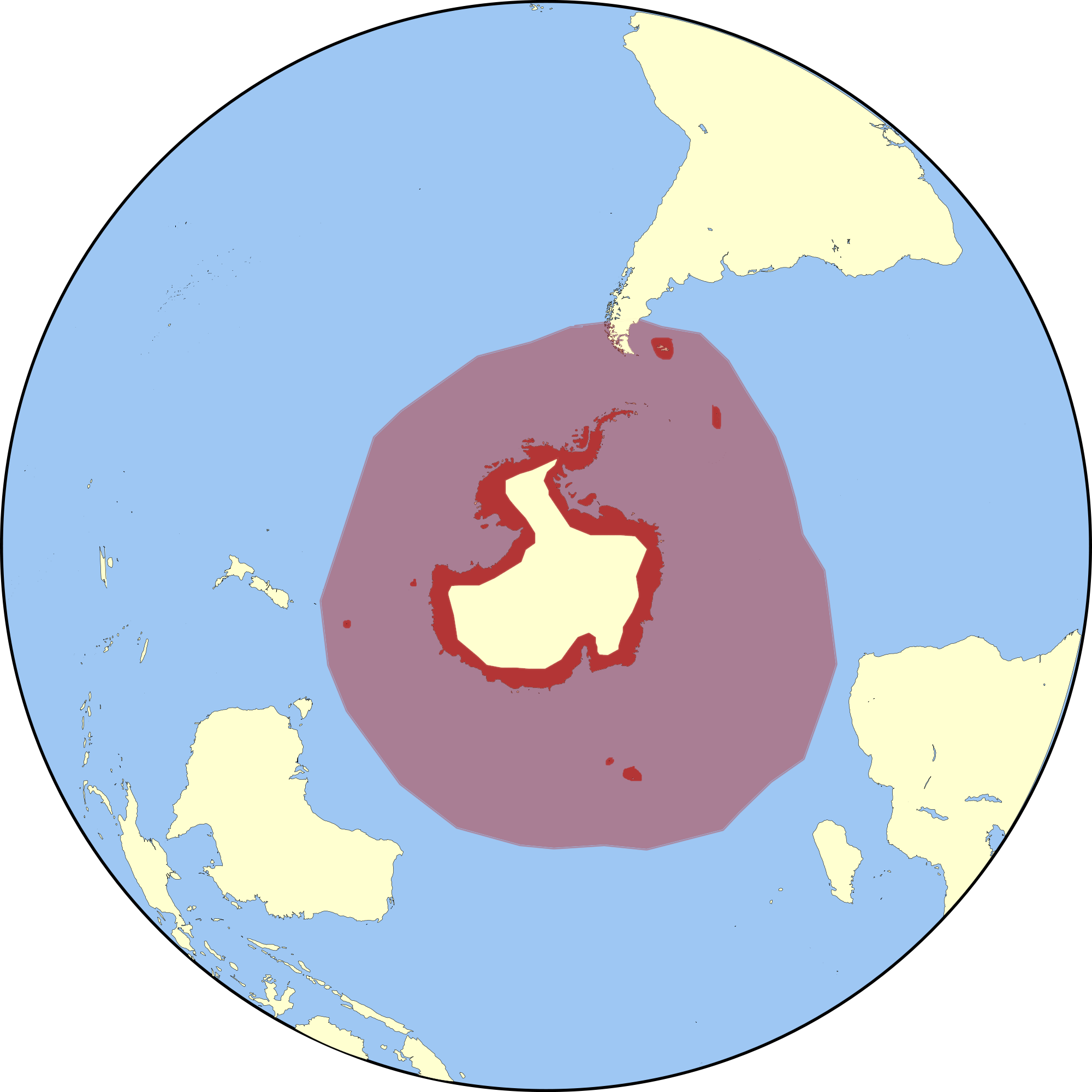
- Distribution of the gentoo penguin

= Gentoo penguin =

Gentoo penguin Temporal range: Miocene to recent

Species of bird

The gentoo penguin (Pygoscelis papua) is a penguin species (and possibly species complex) in the genus Pygoscelis, most closely related to the Adélie penguin (P. adeliae) and the chinstrap penguin (P. antarcticus). The earliest scientific description was made in 1781 by Johann Reinhold Forster with a type locality in the Falkland Islands. The species calls in a variety of ways, but the most frequently heard is a loud, trumpeting call, emitted with the head thrown back.

== Names ==
The application of "gentoo" to the penguin is unclear. Gentoo was an Anglo-Indian term to distinguish Hindus from Muslims. The English term may have originated from the Portuguese gentio ("pagan, gentile"). Some speculate that the white patch on the bird's head was thought to resemble a turban.

It may also be a variation of another name for this bird, "Johnny penguin", with Johnny being the English counterpart of the Spanish nickname Juanito and sounding vaguely like gentoo. The Johnny rook, a predator, is likely named after the Johnny penguin.

The specific name papua is a misnomer; in the original description, Johann Reinhold Forster, a naturalist who had circumnavigated the world with Captain James Cook, mistakenly assumed that the species occurred in Papua (New Guinea), the closest gentoos being over 6,000 km (3,700 mi) to the south (on Macquarie Island). No penguins are found in New Guinea. Others trace the error to a "possibly fraudulent claim" in 1776 by French naturalist Pierre Sonnerat, who also alleged a Papuan location for the king penguin despite never having been to the island himself.

== Taxonomy ==
The gentoo penguin is one of three species in the genus Pygoscelis. Mitochondrial and nuclear DNA evidence suggests the genus split from other penguins around 38 million years ago (Mya), about 2 million years after the ancestors of the genus Aptenodytes. In turn, the Adélie penguins split from the other members of the genus around 19 Mya, and the chinstrap and gentoo penguins finally diverged around 14 Mya.

There are four subspecies recognized by the International Ornithological Congress:

| Image | Subspecies | Distribution |
|---|---|---|
| | P. p. taeniata (eastern gentoo penguin) (Peale, 1849) | Crozet Islands, Prince Edward Islands, Kerguelen Islands, Heard Island, and Macquarie Island |
| | P. p. papua (northern gentoo penguin) (Forster, 1781) | Falkland Islands, Martillo Island in the Beagle Channel, and Isla de los Estados (Argentina) |
| | P. p. ellsworthi (southern gentoo penguin) Murphy, 1947 | the Antarctic Peninsula, the South Orkney Islands, South Shetland Islands and South Sandwich Islands |
| | P. p. poncetii (South Georgia gentoo penguin) Tyler, Bonfitto, Clucas, Reddy & Younger, 2020 | South Georgia Island |

Although the population on the Kerguelen Islands is tentatively included in taeniata, it may also be a distinct subspecies.

Before 2021, only two subspecies of the gentoo penguin had been recognised: P. p. papua (subantarctic gentoo) and the smaller P. p. ellsworthi (Antarctic gentoo). However, a 2020 study suggested that the gentoo penguin be split into a species complex of four morphologically similar but separate species: the northern gentoo penguin (P. papua sensu stricto), the southern gentoo penguin (P. ellsworthi), the eastern gentoo penguin (P. taeniata) and the newly described South Georgia gentoo penguin (P. poncetii). The International Ornithological Congress incorporated the results of this study in 2021, but relegated the newly recognised or newly described species to subspecies of P. papua.

=== Noll et al., 2026 ===
A 2026 study, published in the journal Communications Biology by an international research team led by the University of Chile and the University of California, Berkeley, based on the genome sequencing of ten colonies, proposes recognizing four species of gentoo penguin:

- P. papua (northern) in the Falkland Islands and South America;
- P. taeniata (eastern) in several groups of subantarctic islands:
  - P. t. taeniata on Macquarie Island;
  - another undescribed subspecies on the Crozet Islands and Marion Island;
- P. ellsworthi (southern) with two subspecies:
  - P. e. ellsworthi on the Antarctic Peninsula, the South Orkney Islands, and the South Shetland Islands;
  - P. e. poncetii on South Georgia;
- P. kerguelensis (southeastern) on the Kerguelen Islands and Heard Island.

This study elevates the first three taxa from subspecies to species, but identifies P. kerguelensis as a new taxon.

Divergence time estimates indicate that these four species began separating approximately 300,000 to 500,000 years ago during the Pleistocene epoch. This speciation process was driven by geographic isolation, philopatry (the tendency to return to the same nesting site each year), and oceanographic boundaries like the Antarctic Polar Front restricting gene flow between populations.

Although gentoo penguins were globally classed by the IUCN as Least Concern prior to this, this taxonomic split highlights the specific vulnerabilities of each distinct species. For instance, Species Distribution Modeling (SDM) projections under a moderate climate change scenario (RCP 4.5) for the year 2050 indicate that P. kerguelensis could lose a large portion of suitable marine habitat around the Kerguelen Islands due to rising sea temperatures and shifts in primary productivity. Because of the highly isolated nature of the islands, the species has limited options to relocate or colonise new areas. In addition to climate change, other threats include the potential spread of avian influenza and disturbances from invasive species on land.

==== Southeastern (P. kerguelensis) ====
The southeastern gentoo penguin (Pygoscelis kerguelensis) is a proposed species of penguin in the genus Pygoscelis. This species is endemic to the Kerguelen Islands (hence the specific name) and is also believed to inhabit nearby Heard Island. It is often considered a cryptic species, because its members are morphologically very similar to other gentoo penguins.

The holotype is AMNH SKIN 525824, an adult male collected by Robert Hall at the Kerguelen Islands on 31 December 1897, housed at the American Museum of Natural History.

Visually, P. kerguelensis shares an identical plumage pattern with other gentoo penguins, with a black head with a white patch extending across the crown from eye to eye, a dark slate-grey back, a white chest and belly, an orange bill with a black tip, and orange to pink feet.

P. kerguelensis is intermediate in body size. It is smaller than the northern gentoo penguin (P. papua), larger than the southern gentoo penguin (P. e. ellsworthi), and relatively similar in size to the eastern gentoo penguin (P. taeniata).

Average morphological measurements for P. kerguelensis include:

- Culmen length: 53.96 mm
- Bill width at base: 15.56 mm
- Bill height at gonys angle: 15.05 mm
- Tarsus length: 31.87 mm
- Middle toe length: 63.64 mm

Genomic analyses reveal signals of positive selection in P. kerguelensis that support adaptations to a seasonal Subantarctic environment:

1. Neural plasticity and muscle adaptation: Enrichment of genes related to synaptic signaling (such as CHRNB3, GRIN2A, MEF2C) as well as muscle structural adaptations (such as BMP4, CACNB2, PDEV4B) supporting efficient movement and foraging behaviour.
2. Vocal learning: Selection on glutamate receptor genes (GRM1, GRM8, GRIN2A, CADPS2) involved in avian vocal systems. Differences in calls and vocal behaviour are thought to contribute to reproductive isolation.

Unlike emperor or Adélie penguins, which have specialised diets, P. kerguelensis and its relatives are dietary generalists, consuming fish, krill, squid, and cuttlefish. Ample local food availability means they do not need to migrate far from breeding colonies, reinforcing genetic isolation between islands.

== Description ==
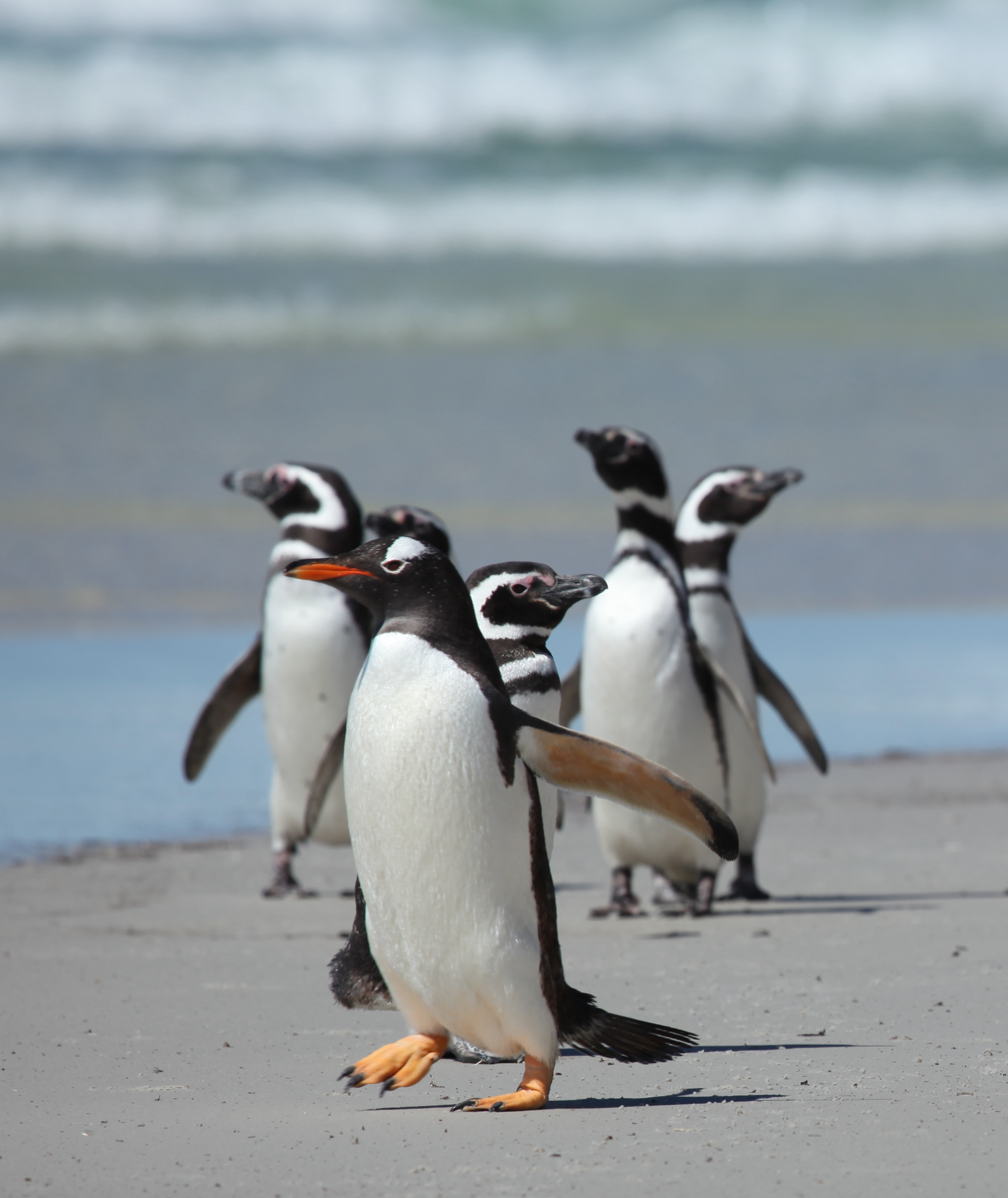
Gentoo penguin in front of a group of Magellanic penguins (Spheniscus magellanicus) on Saunders Island

The gentoo penguin is easily recognised by the broad, white stripe extending like a bonnet across the top of its head and its bright orange-red bill. It has pale whitish-pink, webbed feet and a relatively long tail – the most prominent tail of all penguin species. Chicks have grey backs with white fronts. As the gentoo penguin waddles along on land, its tail sticks out behind, sweeping from side to side, hence the scientific name Pygoscelis, which means "rump-tailed".

Gentoo penguins can reach a length of 70 to 90 cm (28 to 35 in), making them the third-largest species of penguin after the emperor penguin and the king penguin. Males have a maximum weight around 8.5 kg (19 lb) just before moulting and a minimum weight of about 4.9 kg (11 lb) just before mating. For females, the maximum weight is 8.2 kg (18 lb) just before moulting, but their weight drops to as little as 4.5 kg (9.9 lb) when guarding the chicks in the nest. Birds from the north are on average 700 g (1.5 lb) heavier and 10 cm (3.9 in) longer than the southern birds. Southern gentoo penguins reach 75–80 cm (30–31 in) in length. They are the fastest underwater swimmers of all penguins, reaching speeds up to 36 km/h (22 mph). Gentoos are well adapted to frigid and harsh climates.

== Breeding ==
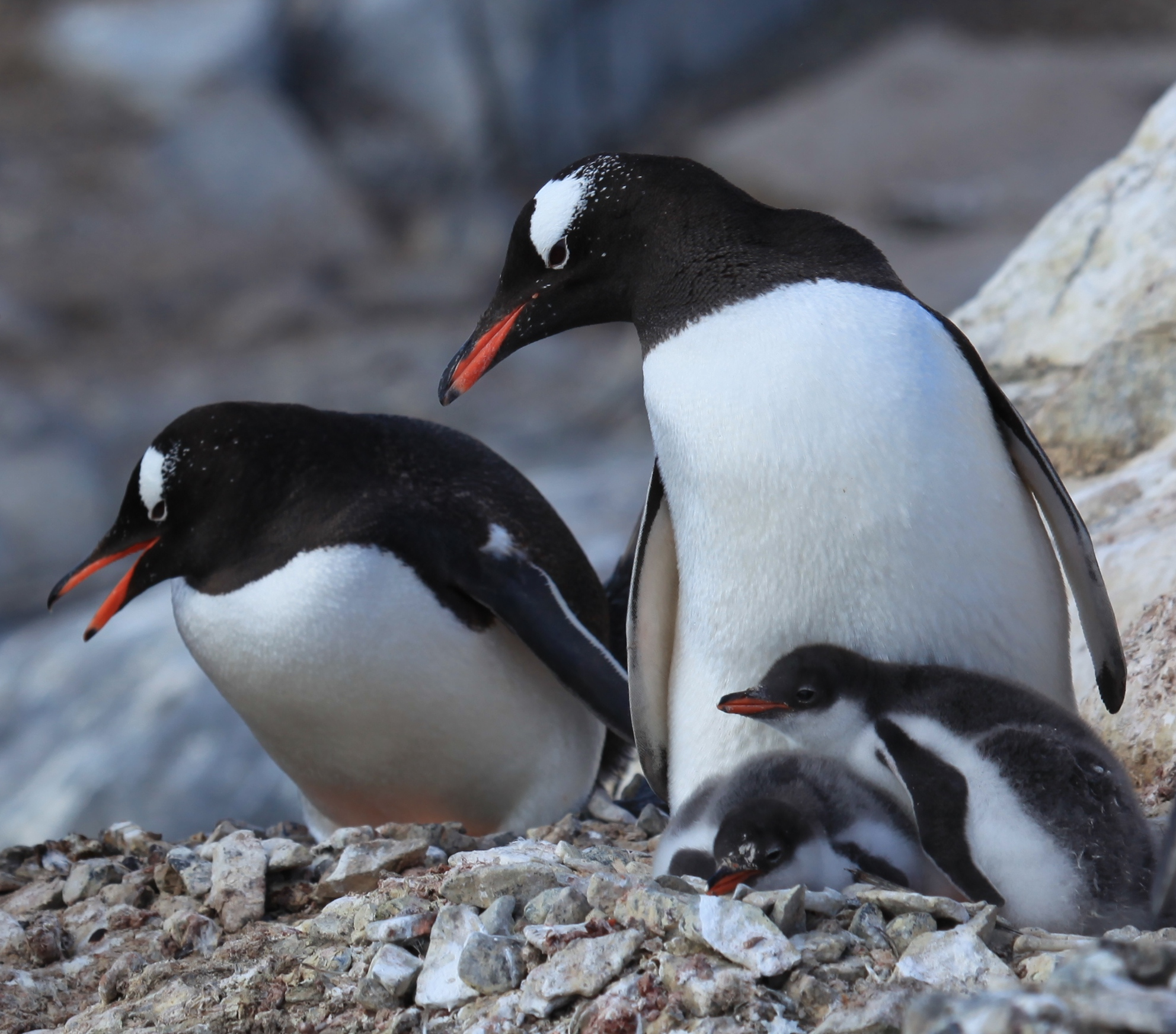
A family on Wiencke Island, Palmer Archipelago, off the coast of the Antarctic Peninsula

The breeding colonies of gentoo penguins are located on ice-free surfaces. Settlements can be located directly on the shoreline or considerably inland. They prefer shallow coastal areas and often nest between tufts of grass. In South Georgia, for example, breeding colonies are 2 km (1.2 mi) inland. In colonies farther inland, where the penguins nest in grassy areas, they shift their location slightly each year because the grass becomes trampled over time.

Gentoo penguins breed on many subantarctic islands. The main colonies are on the Falkland Islands, South Georgia and the South Sandwich Islands and Kerguelen Islands; smaller colonies are found on: Macquarie Island, Heard Islands, Crozet Islands, South Shetland Islands and the Antarctic Peninsula. The total breeding population is estimated to be over 600,000 birds. Nests are usually made from a roughly circular pile of stones and can be quite large, 20 cm (7.9 in) high and 25 cm (9.8 in) in diameter. The stones are jealously guarded, and their ownership can spark noisy disputes and physical attacks among individuals. They are also prized by the females, even to the point that a male penguin can obtain the favours of a female by offering her a choice stone.

Two eggs are laid, both weighing around 130 g (4.6 oz). The parents share incubation and change duty daily. The eggs hatch after 34 to 36 days. The chicks remain in the nests for around 30 days before joining other chicks in the colony and forming crèches. The chicks moult into subadult plumage and go out to sea at around 80 to 100 days.

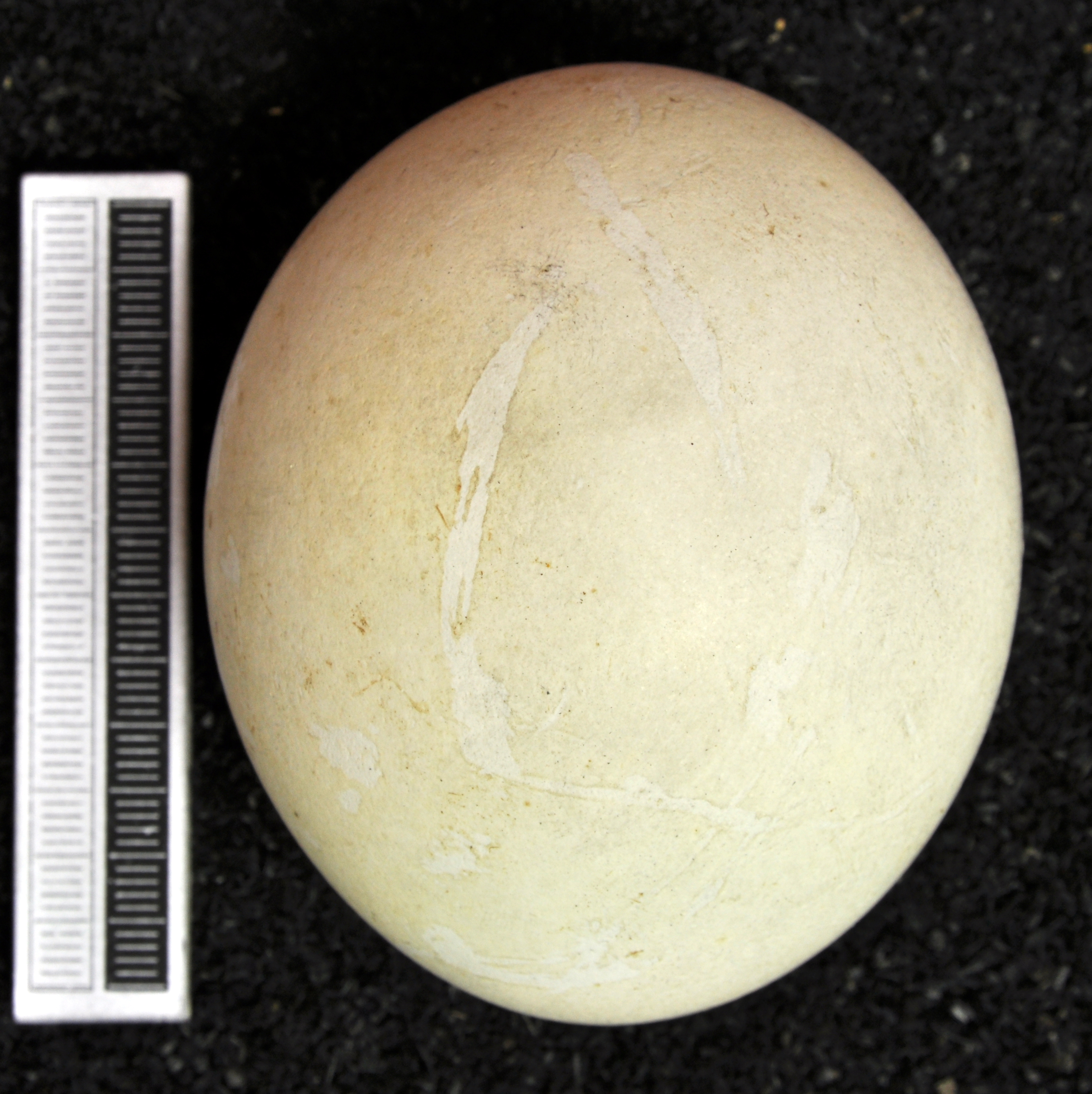
Egg, Museum Wiesbaden

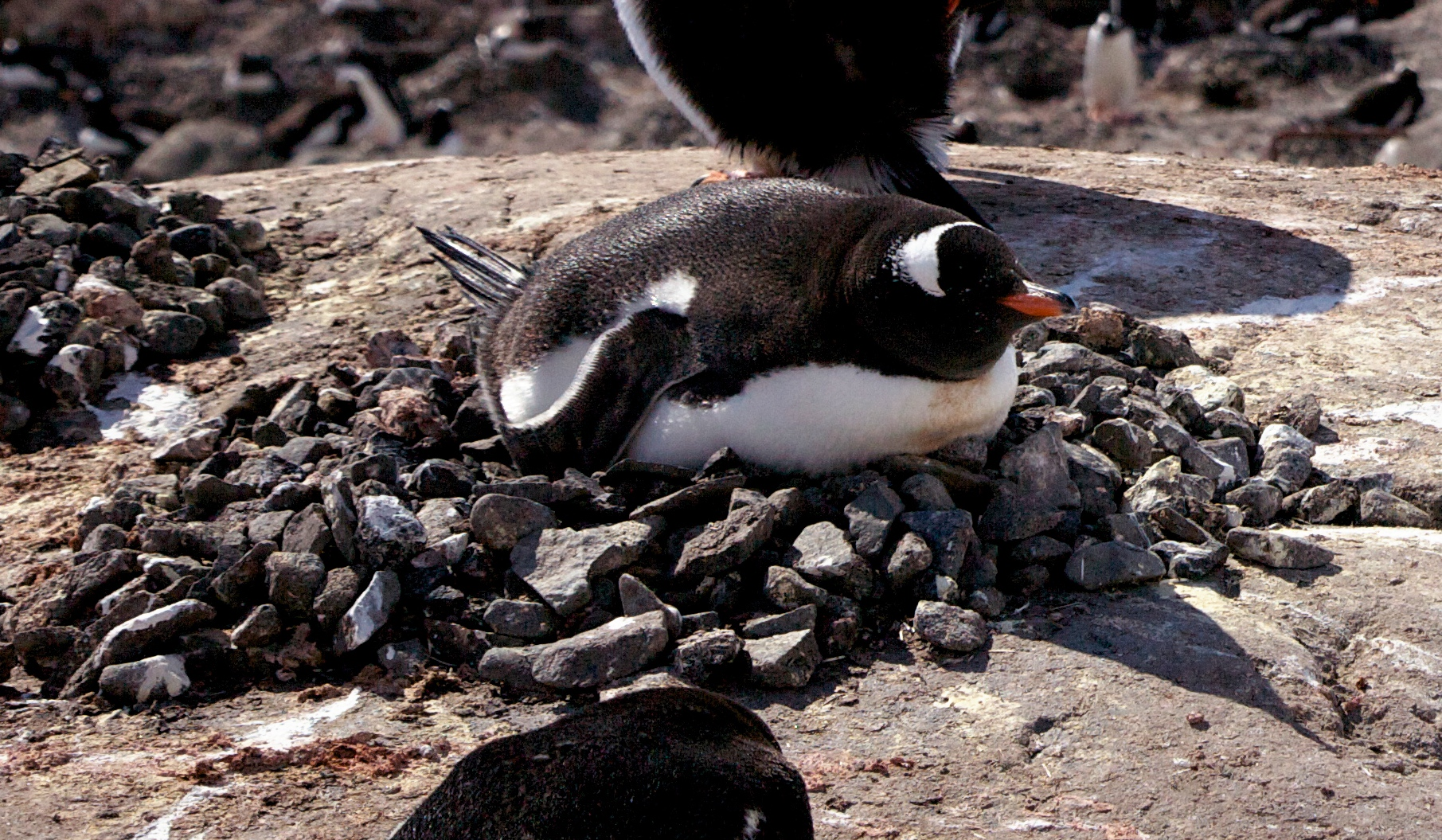
On a nest

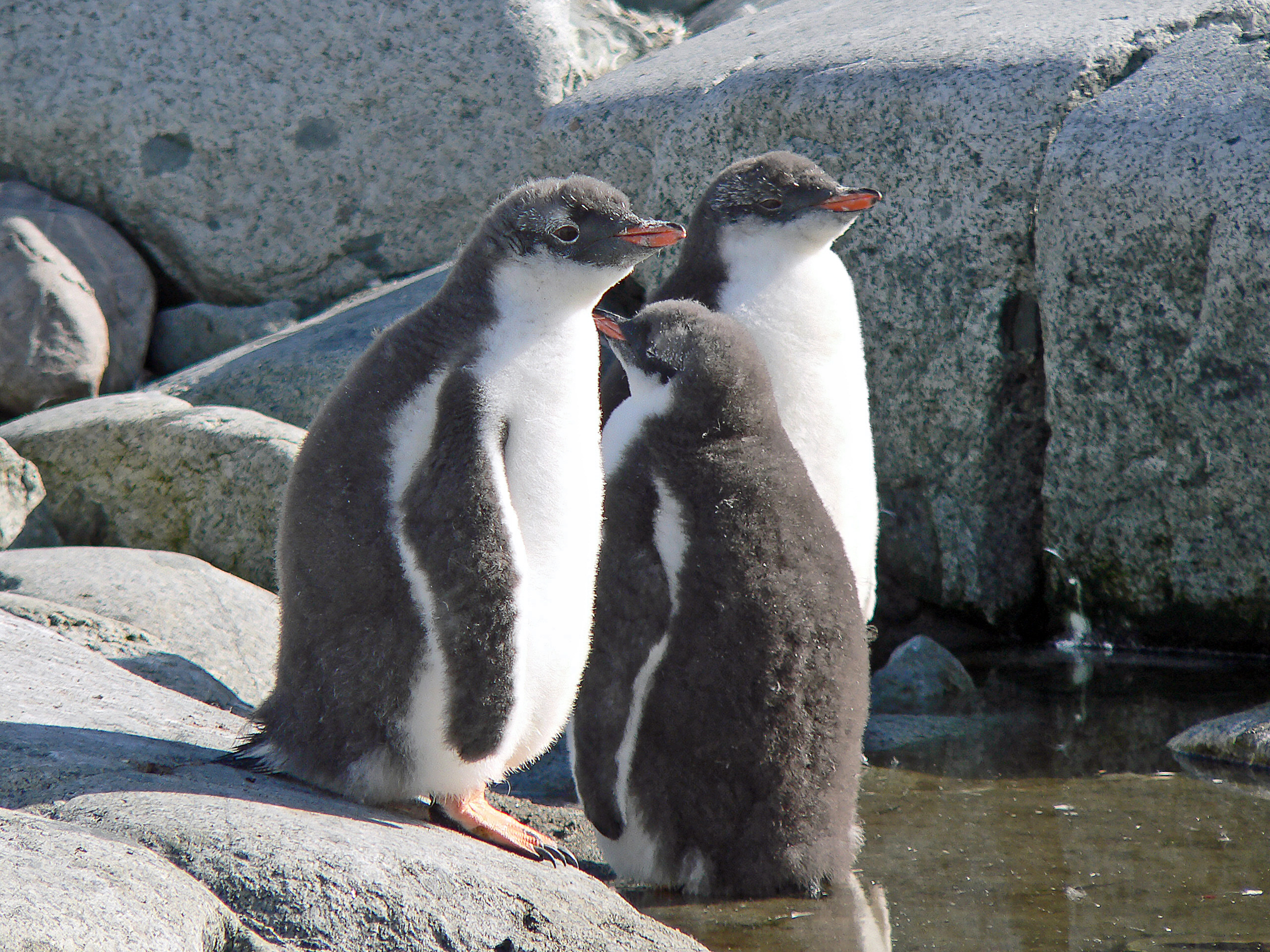
Juveniles on Petermann Island

== Diet ==
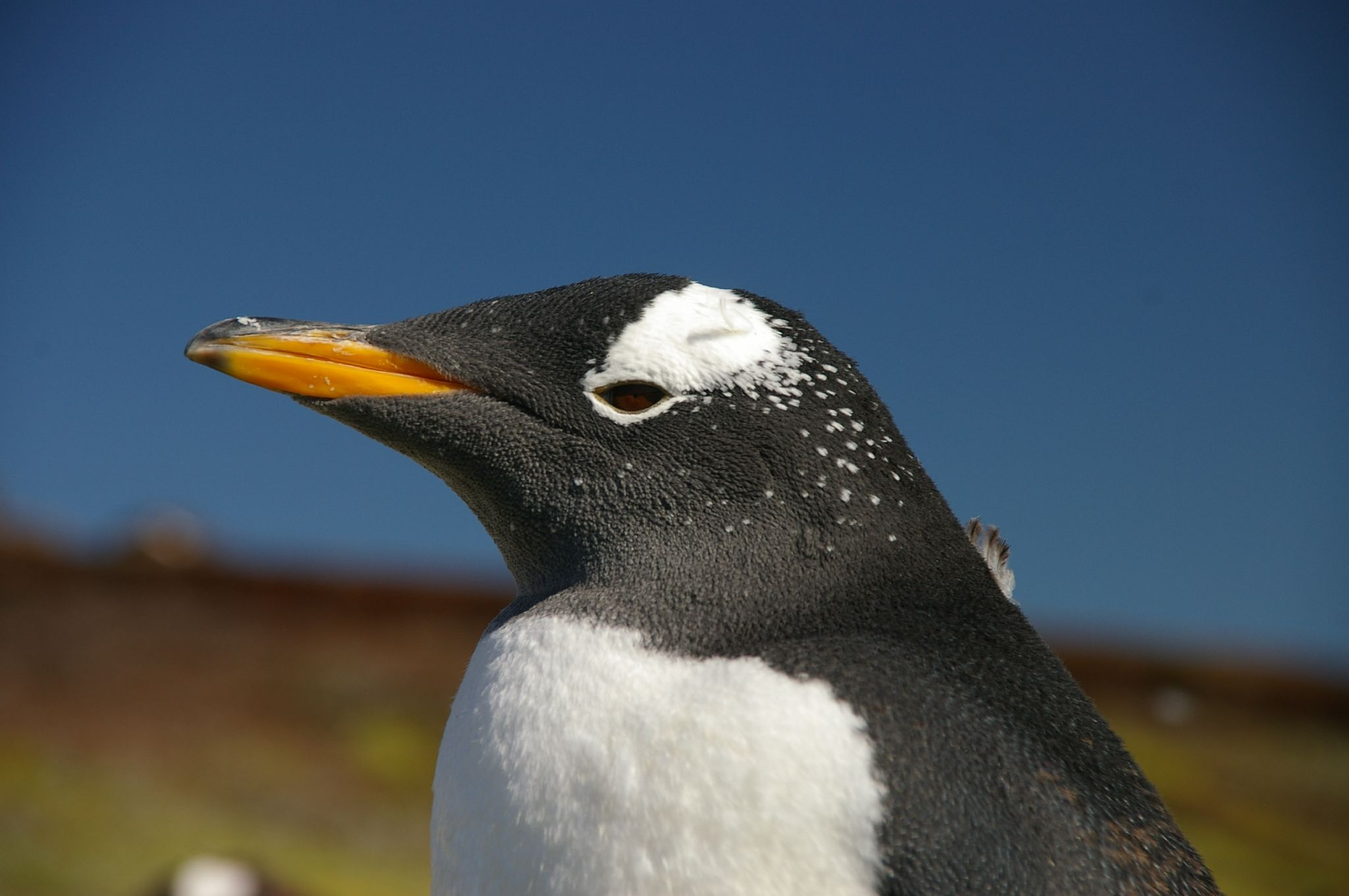
A close-up of head on the West Falkland

Gentoos mainly live on fish, crustaceans such as krill and shrimp, and cephalopods. In February and March, crustaceans make up about 10% of the diet, while from March to June, it is about 75%. From June to October, grey rockcod (Lepidonotothen squamifrons) make up 90% of their diet. Cephalopods make up only 10% of the diet throughout the year.

Gentoos are opportunistic feeders, and around the Falklands are known to take roughly equal proportions of fish (Patagonotothen sp., Thysanopsetta naresi, Micromesistius australis), squat lobsters (Munida gregaria) and squid (Loligo gahi, Gonatus antarcticus, Moroteuthis ingens). Other prey include Channichthys rhinoceratus and octopuses.

== Physiology ==
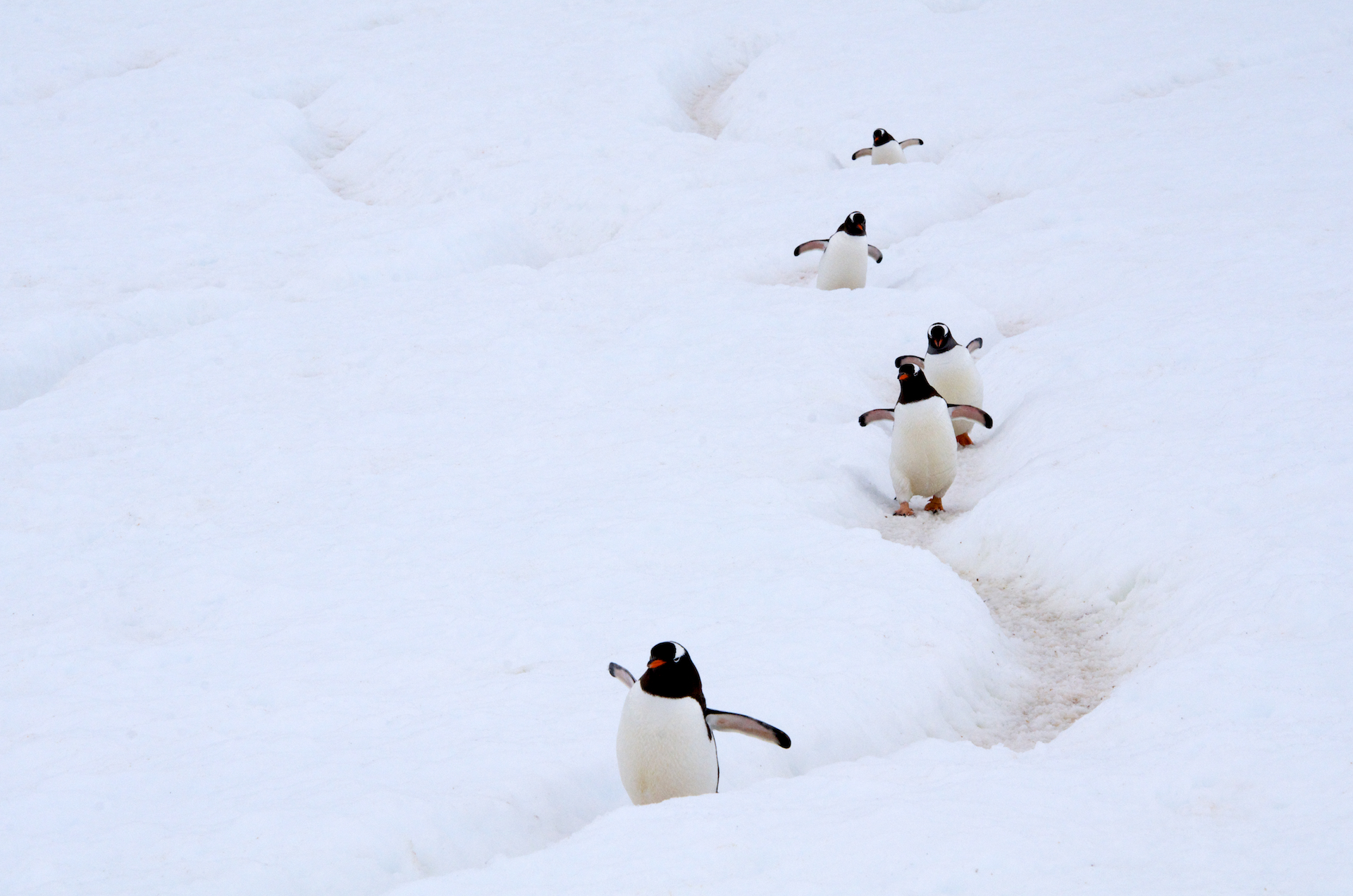
In Antarctica, walking along a "penguin highway", a path that joins the sea and their nesting area on a rocky outcrop

The gentoos' diet is high in salt, as they eat organisms with relatively the same salinity as seawater, which can lead to complications associated with high sodium concentrations in the body, especially for gentoo chicks. To counteract this, gentoos, as well as many other marine bird species, have a highly developed salt gland located above their eyes that takes the high concentration of sodium within the body and produces a highly saline-concentrated solution that drips out of the body from the tip of the beak.

Gentoo penguins do not store as much fat as Adélie penguins, their closest relative; gentoos require less energy investment when hunting because the net gain of energy after hunting is greater in gentoos than Adélies. As embryos, gentoos require a lot of energy to develop. Oxygen consumption is high for a developing gentoo embryo. As the embryo grows and needs more oxygen, consumption increases exponentially until the gentoo chick hatches. By then, the chick is consuming around 1800 ml O_{2} per day.

== Predators ==
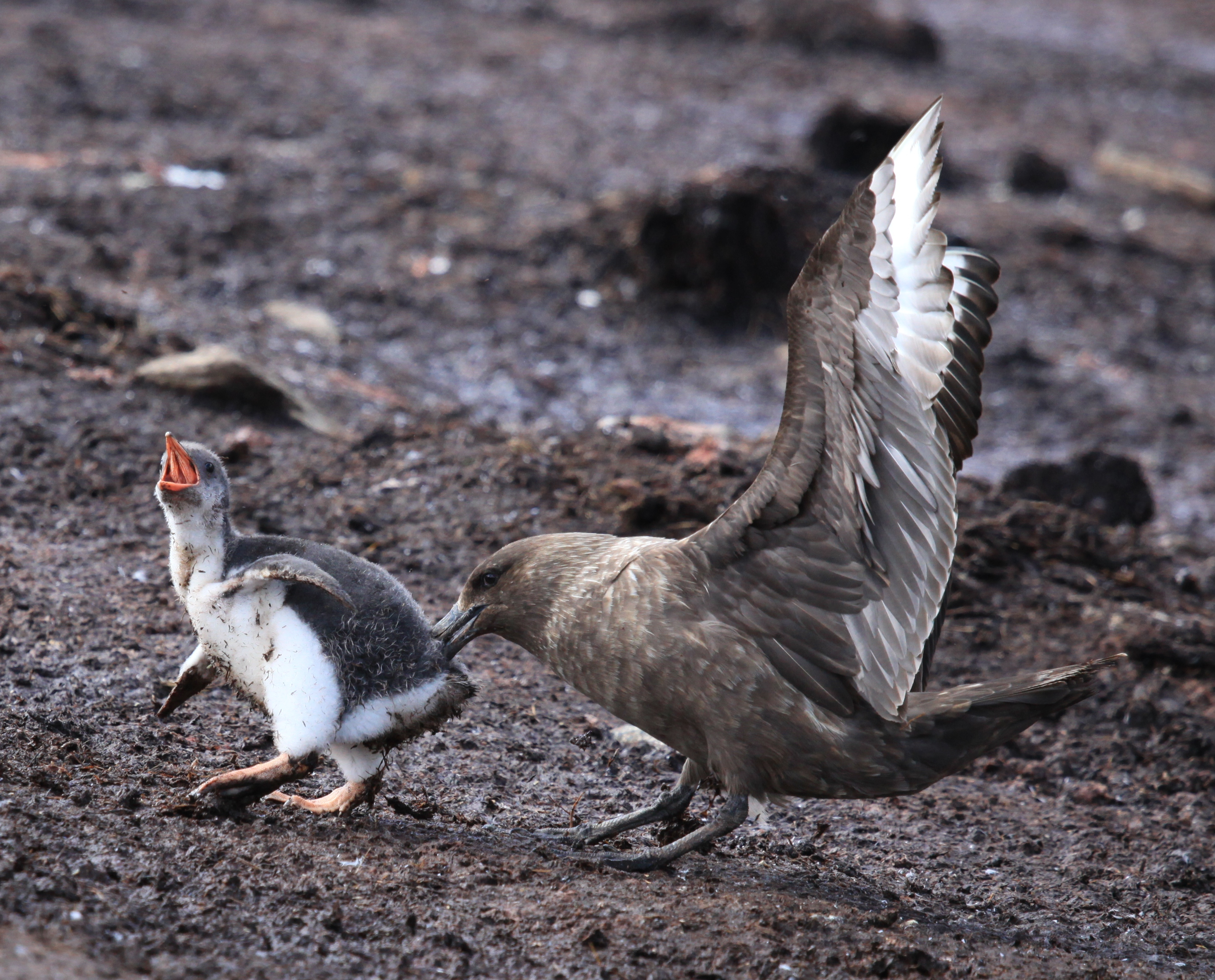
Brown skua (Stercorarius antarcticus) attacking a gentoo chick at Godthul, South Georgia

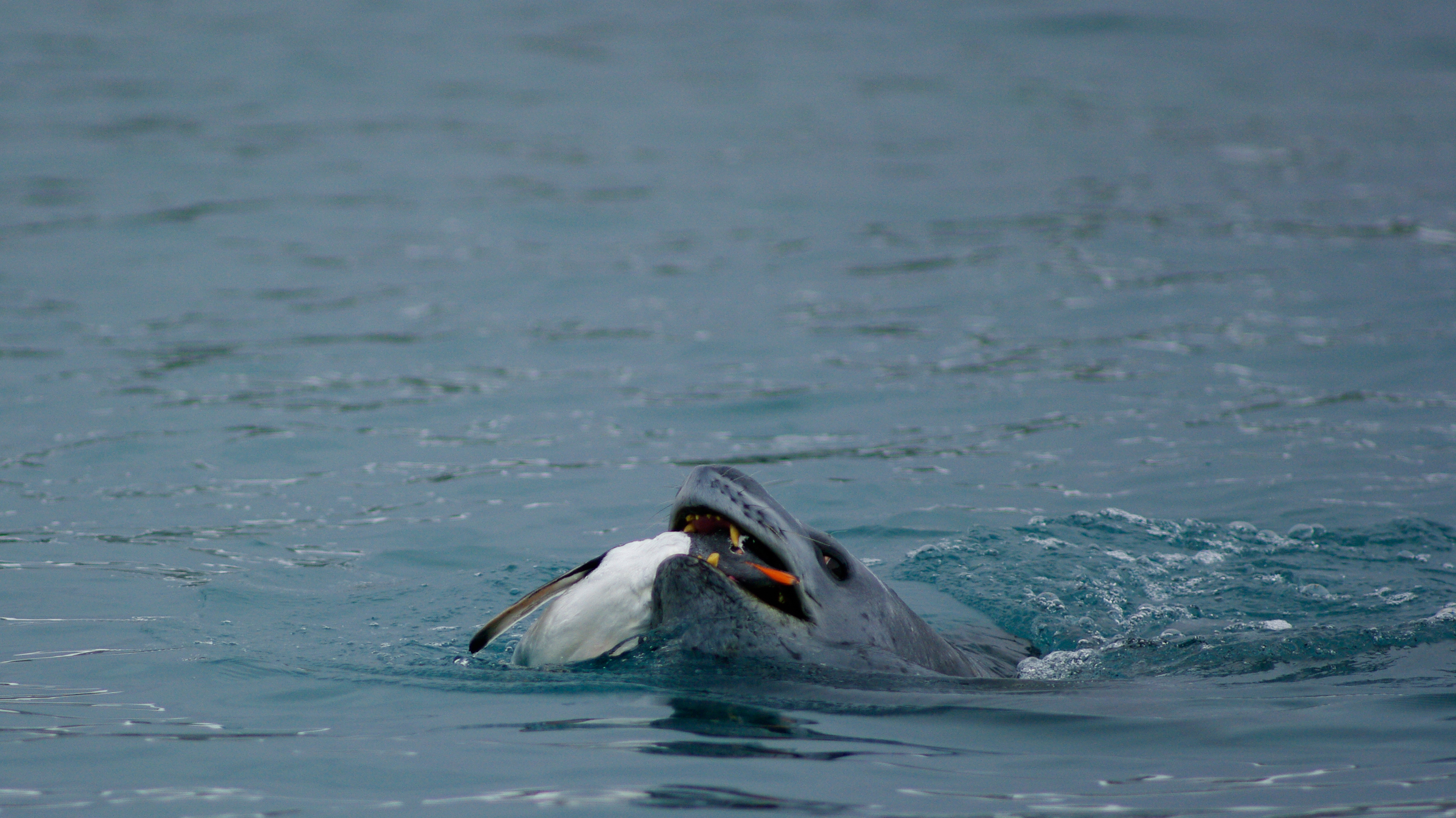
Leopard seal with an adult gentoo penguin

In the sea, leopard seals, sea lions, and killer whales are all predators of the gentoo. On land, there are no predators of full-grown, healthy gentoo penguins. Skuas and giant petrels regularly kill many chicks and steal eggs; petrels kill injured and sick adult gentoos. Various other seabirds, such as the kelp gull and snowy sheathbill, also snatch chicks and eggs. Skuas on King George Island have been observed attacking and injuring adult gentoo penguins in apparent territorial disputes.

== Conservation status ==
The population of Pygoscelis papua in the maritime Antarctic is rapidly increasing. Due to regional climate change, they colonise previously inaccessible territories to the south. As of 2019, the IUCN Red List lists the gentoo as least concerned with a stable population trend. However, rapid declines in some key areas are believed to be driving a moderate overall decline in the species population. Examples include Bird Island, South Georgia, where the population has fallen by two-thirds over 25 years. Many threats to this species, including pollution, hunting, fishing, and human recreational activities, continue to affect them.

== In popular culture ==
The Linux distribution Gentoo Linux is named after the gentoo penguin. This refers to the penguin's status as the fastest-swimming penguin, as Gentoo Linux aims to be a high-performance operating system. The mascot for Linux in general is a penguin.

The 2011 film adaptation of Mr. Popper's Penguins features six gentoo penguins named Captain, Lovey, Loudy, Bitey, Stinky, and Nimrod.

== Gallery ==
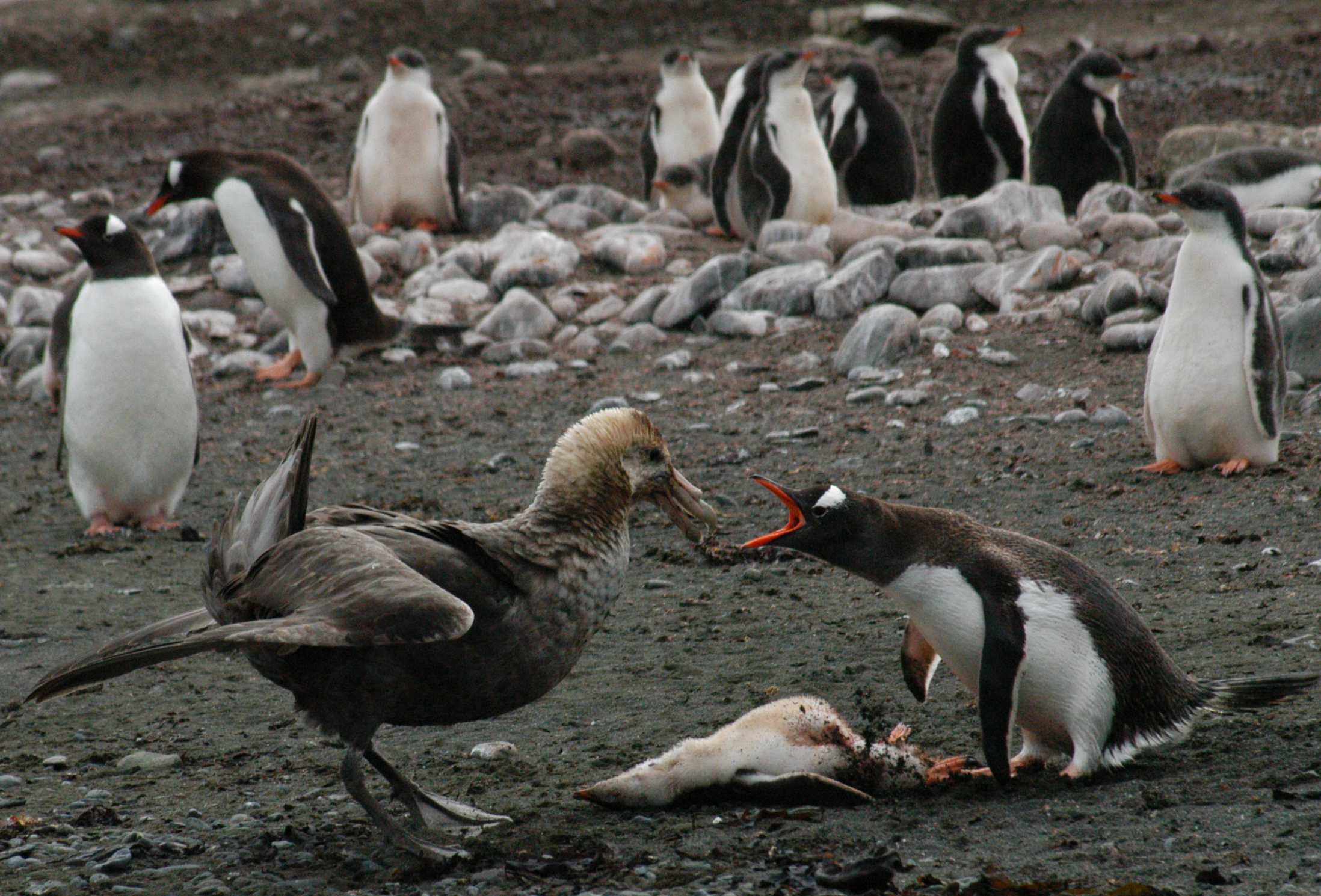
Adult gentoo confronting a southern giant petrel (Macronectes giganteus) that has killed a chick

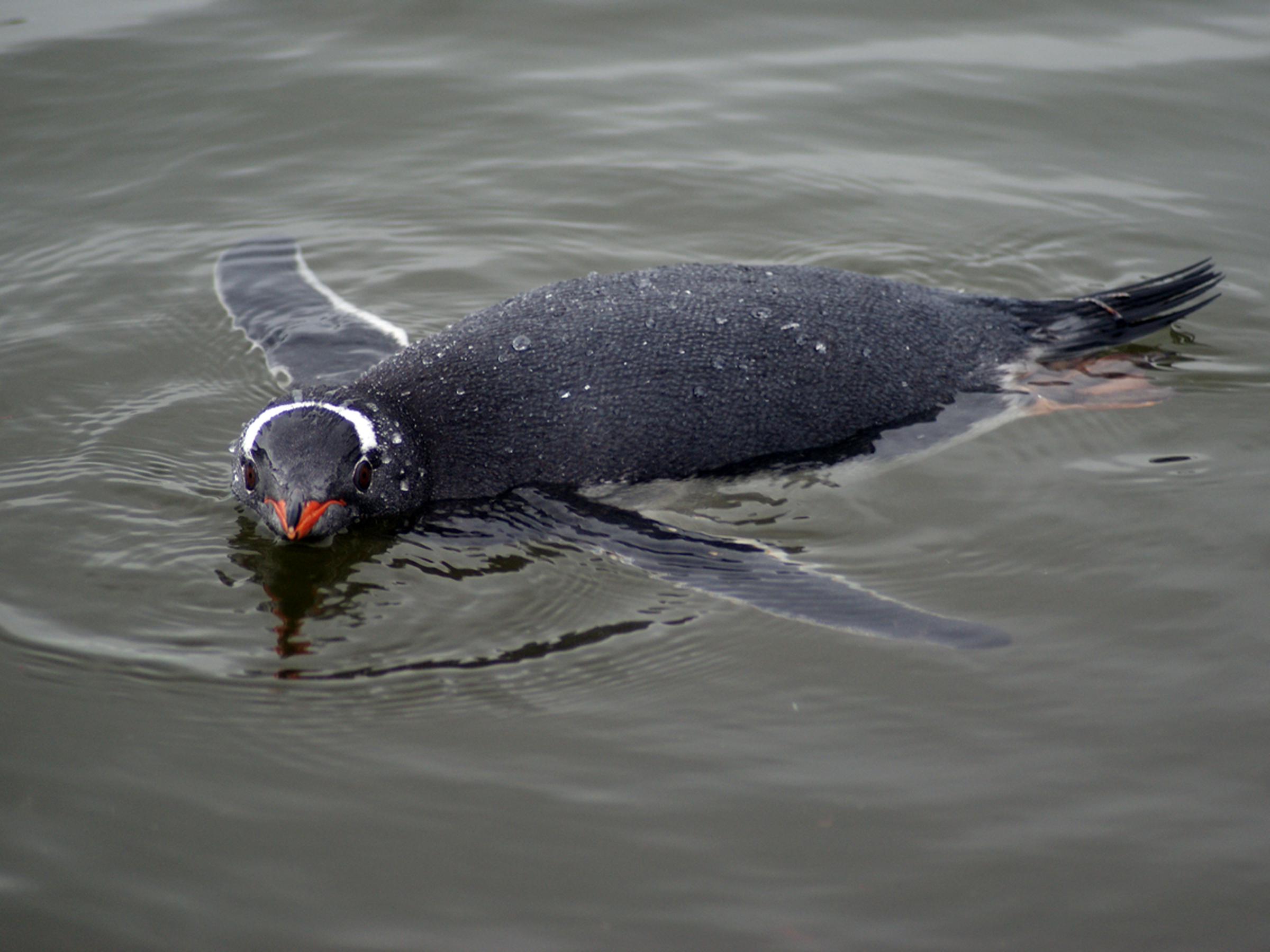
A gentoo penguin swimming

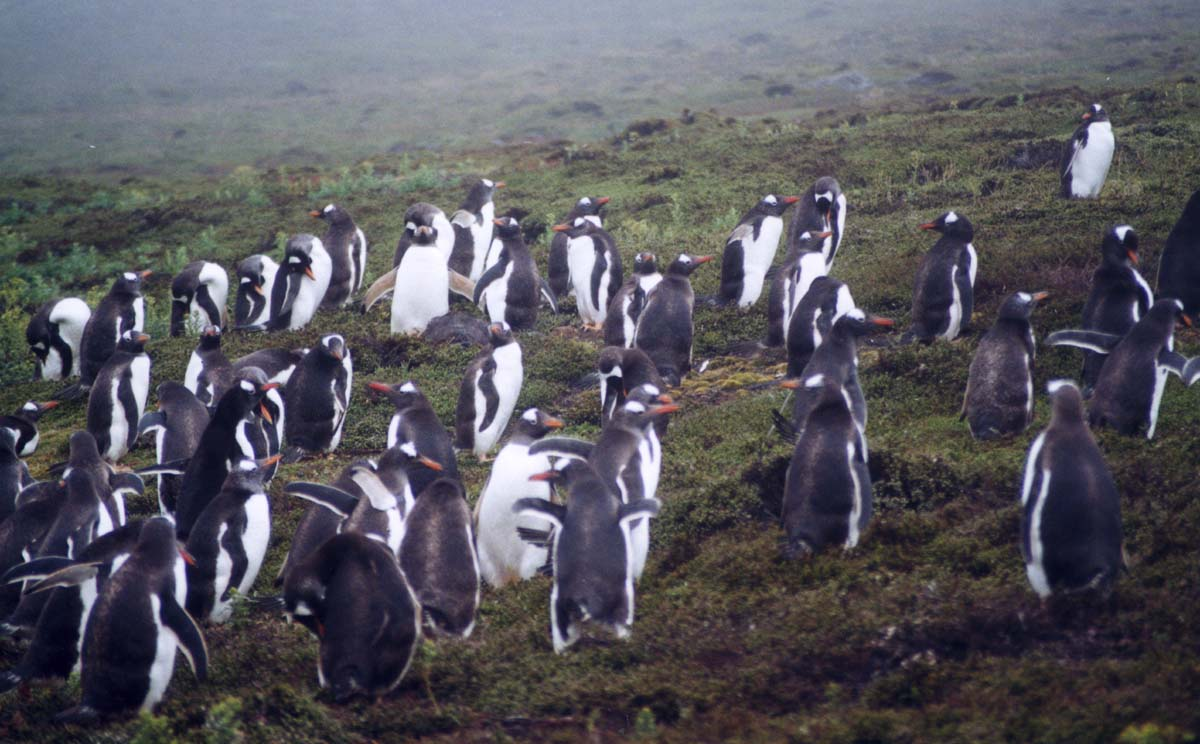
Gentoo colony on Carcass Island in the Falklands

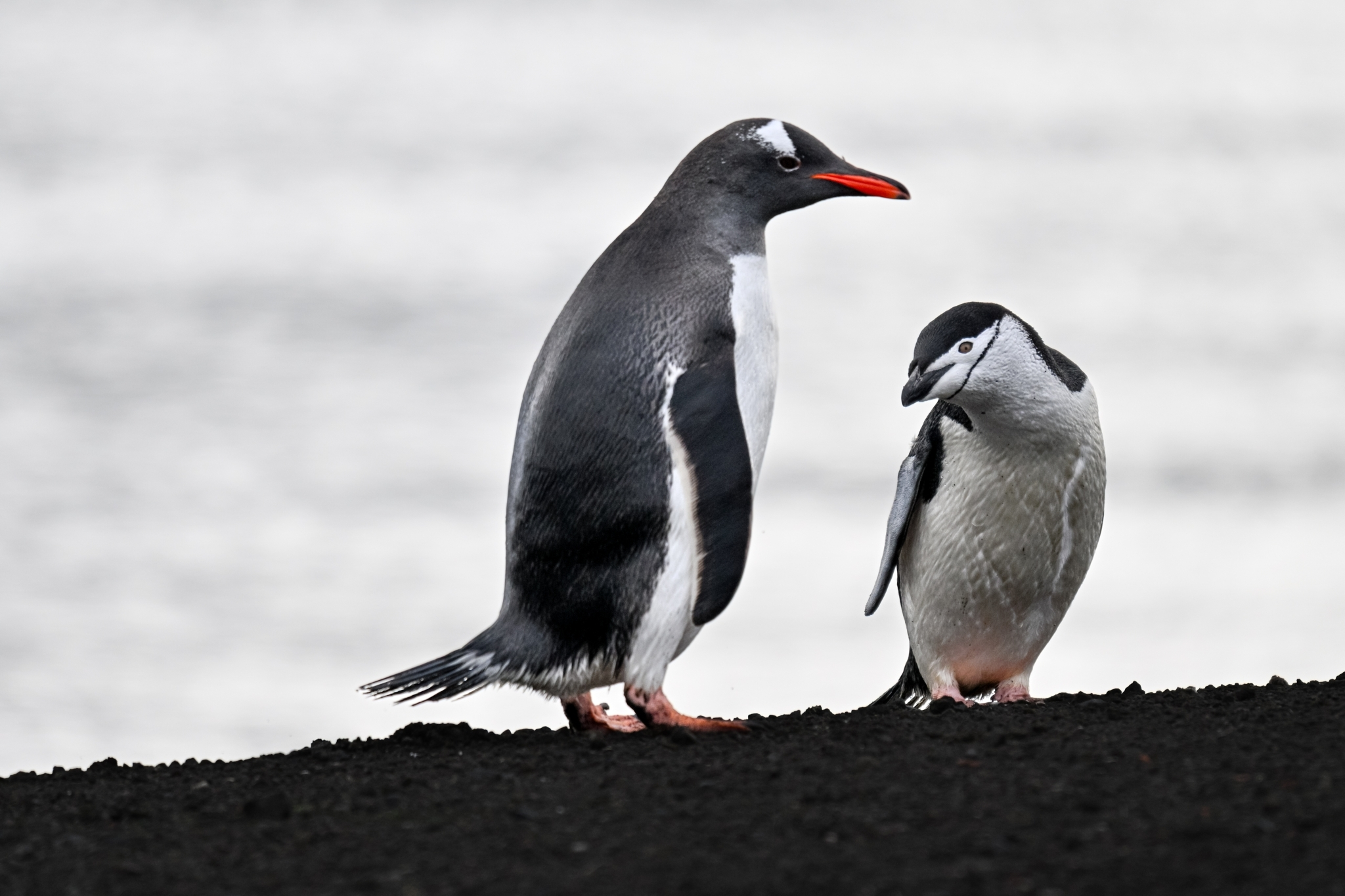
Gentoo (left) and chinstrap (right)

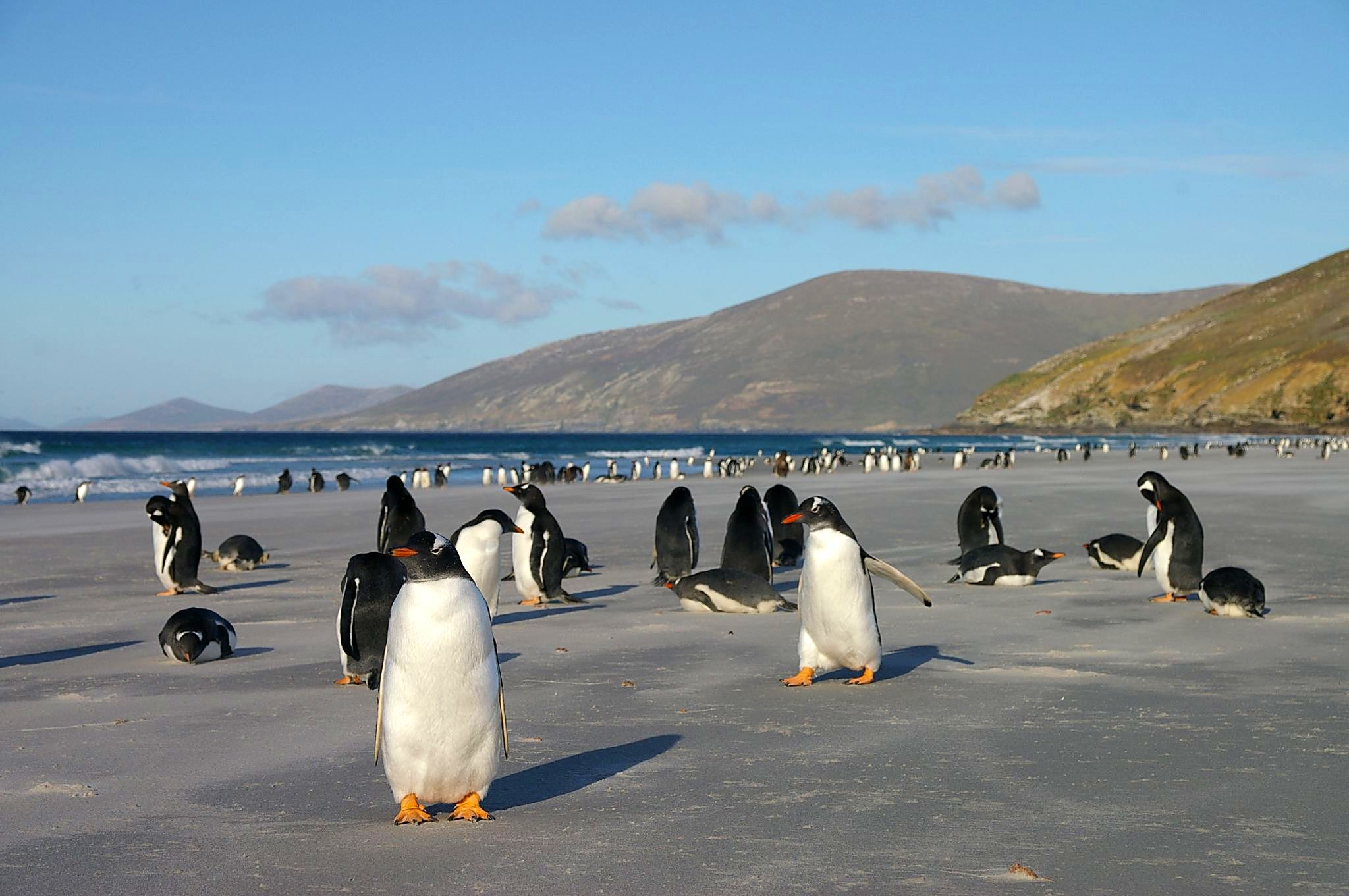
Saunders Island, Falkland Islands
