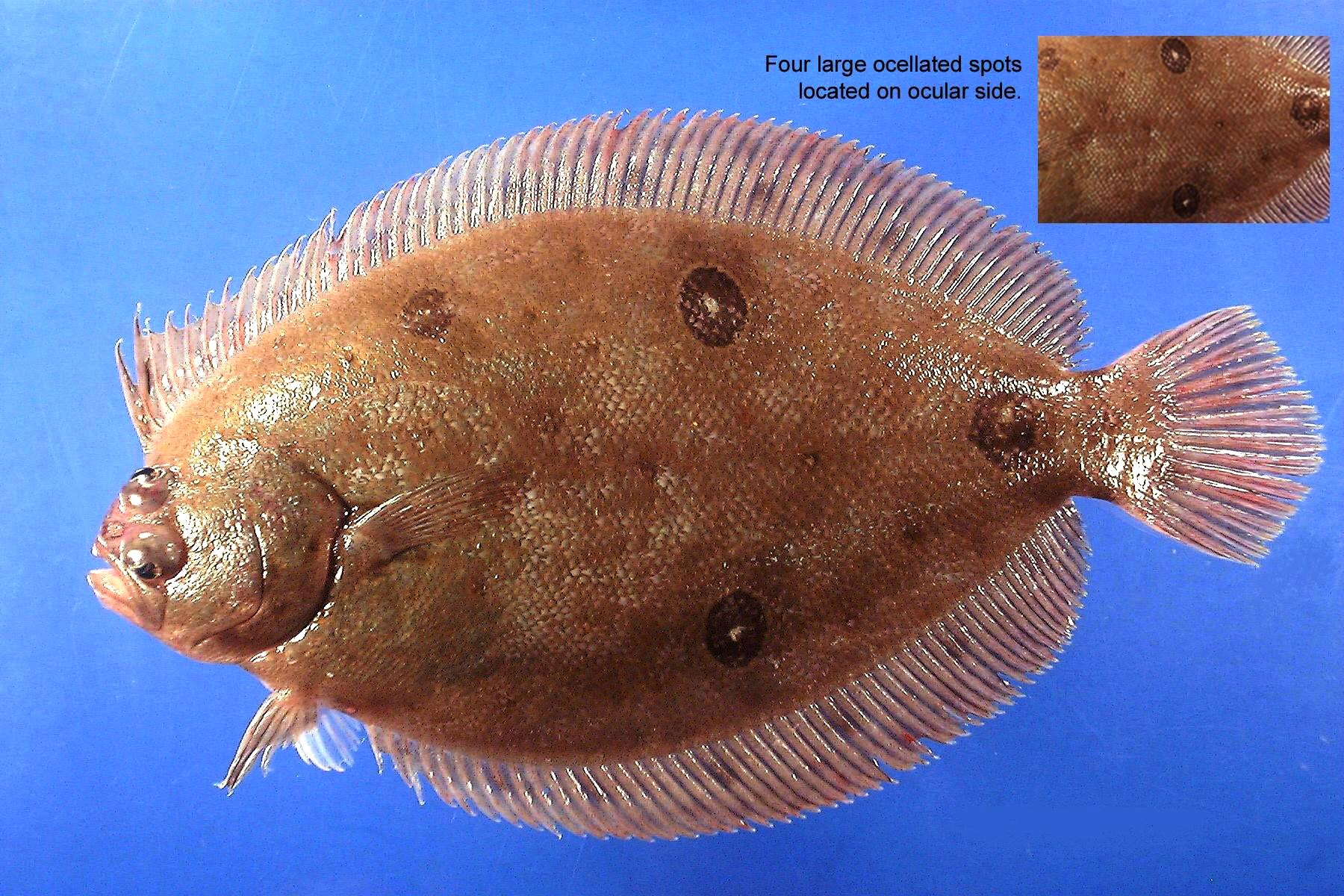

Conservation status
- Least Concern (IUCN 3.1)

Scientific classification
- Kingdom: Animalia
- Phylum: Chordata
- Class: Actinopterygii
- Order: Carangiformes
- Suborder: Pleuronectoidei
- Family: Paralichthyidae
- Genus: Ancylopsetta
- Species: A. ommata

Binomial name
- Ancylopsetta ommata (D. S. Jordan & C. H. Gilbert, 1883)

Synonyms
- Paralichthys ommatus Jordan & Gilbert, 1883; Ancylopsetta quadrocellata Gill, 1864

= Ancylopsetta ommata =

Species of fish

Ancylopsetta ommata, the Gulf of Mexico ocellated flounder, is a species of large-tooth flounder native to the Atlantic coast of North America and the Gulf of Mexico. It is found at depths from 4 to 110 m (13 to 361 ft). This species grows to 25 cm (9.8 in) in total length.
