= Five eyes =

Five eyes or 5 Eyes may refer to:

- Five eyes (genus), the genus of plants Chamaesaracha
- Five Eyes, an intelligence alliance comprising Australia, Canada, New Zealand, the United Kingdom and the United States
- Operation Fortune: Ruse de guerre, a 2023 spy film was previously known as Five Eyes
- The Council of the 5 Eyes, a fictional terrorist organization from the videogame Police Quest: SWAT II
- FVEY (album) (pronounced 5 eyes), a 2014 alt-rock album by Shihad
- "Five Eyes", a poem by Walter de la Mare

== See also ==
- The Technical Cooperation Program, a long-standing international organisation
- ECHELON
- Five-eyed flounder, a species of flatfish
- Many eyes (disambiguation)
