= Tarphops elegans =

Scientific classification
- Domain: Eukaryota
- Kingdom: Animalia
- Phylum: Chordata
- Class: Actinopterygii
- Order: Carangiformes
- Suborder: Pleuronectoidei
- Family: Paralichthyidae
- Genus: Tarphops
- Species: T. elegans

Binomial name
- Tarphops elegans Amaoka, 1969

Species of fish

Tarphops elegans is a species of large-tooth flounders native to the northwest Pacific Ocean (Japan and South Korea).
