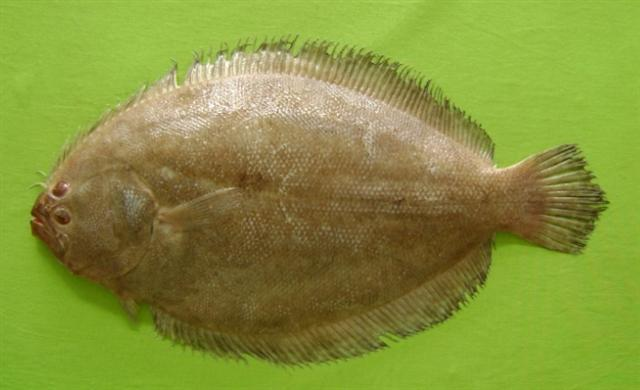

Scientific classification
- Kingdom: Animalia
- Phylum: Chordata
- Class: Actinopterygii
- Order: Carangiformes
- Suborder: Pleuronectoidei
- Family: Paralichthyidae
- Genus: Pseudorhombus
- Species: P. arsius

Binomial name
- Pseudorhombus arsius (Hamilton, 1822)

Synonyms
- Pleuronectes arsius Hamilton, 1822; Rhombus lentiginosus Richardson, 1843; Rhombus polyspilos Bleeker, 1853; Pseudorhombus polyspilos (Bleeker, 1853); Teratorhombus excisiceps Macleay, 1881; Pleuronectes mortoniensis De Vis, 1882; Neorhombus occellatus De Vis, 1886; Pseudorhombus andersoni Gilchrist, 1904

= Pseudorhombus arsius =

Species of fish

Pseudorhombus arsius, the largetooth flounder, is a species of left-eyed flatfish. As an adult, the dark side of its body, where its eyes are located, is on the left side. It belongs to the family Paralichthyidae. As Rhombus polyspilos, it was named as the type species of the genus Pseudorhombus. It is an Indo-Pacific species and is caught by both recreational and commercial fisheries.

== Description ==
Pseudorhombus arsius has an oval-shaped body which has a depth which is 1.8 to 2.3 times its standard length. The head has a slight notch in front of its upper eye. The eyes are on the left side and have a diameter which is a fifth of the length of the head and the snout has a length equal to or slightly greater than the diameter of the eye. The dorsal fin starts in front of its upper eye and of the nostrils on blind side. The mouth forms a deep cleft with the maxilla normally almost half the length of the head. The jaws and teeth are nearly equally developed on both jaws. The upper jaw reaches to below the posterior edge of the lower eye. There are several pairs of moderately large caniform teeth in the anterior parts of both jaws, which are of unequal size and arranged in a single row. These number 5 to 8 in the lower jaw on the eyed side, and 6 to 13 lateral teeth in lower jaw of blind side which are more robust and more widely spaced than those of upper jaw. The gill rakers are pointed, longer than they are broad.

It has simple fin-rays which number 71–84 in the dorsal fin, 53–62 in the anal fin and 11–13 in the pectoral fin. The lateral line curves above the pectoral fin has 69-81 scales and there are 36 vertebrae. In the dorsal fin, the longest rays are found in the posterior third and only the rearmost three or four rays are branched, as at the last five anal fin rays. Two dark spots are situated on the central part of its dorsal surface, one just to the posterior of the pectoral fin and the second is midway between the forward spot and the tail. The body is greenish to pale brownish in colour and is normally marked with variously sized rings, and there is frequently two dark blotches on the straight and the curved sections of the lateral line with a smaller blotch which is half-way to the caudal-fin peduncle. It can vary the colour of the body so that it closely matches the surface the fish rests on. They grow to 50 cm, but 30 cm in length is the more usual size

== Distribution ==
Pseudorhombus arsius is found in the tropical and temperate waters from the Persian Gulf and the eastern coast of Africa as far south as Algoa Bay and possibly even Knysna to Fiji in the western Pacific, to southern Japan in the north and as far south as the northern coast of Australia. It may extend as far south as the Bass Strait.

== Habitat and biology ==
Pseudorhombus arsius occurs in shallow waters and in estuaries where the substrate consists of mud and sand bottoms, to depths of 200 m. The juveniles are common in brackish water. When they are spawning, they are found in shallow water on sandbanks and close to shore. They move to deeper waters during winter. They are predators which prey mainly on benthic animals. The spawning season runs for 3 to 4 months, from April to July and peaks in April and May, during which they move into the sandy shallows close to the shore. The spawn is laid in a single batch. They mature when they attain a total length of between 16 and 17 cm in total length. The sex ratio is always biased towards females and the fecundity of the fish is dependent on its total length and body weight.

== Fisheries ==
Pseudorhombus arsius is subjected to a minor commercial fishery in West Bengal in the estuary of the Hooghly River. Otherwise it is a quarry for recreational angling.
