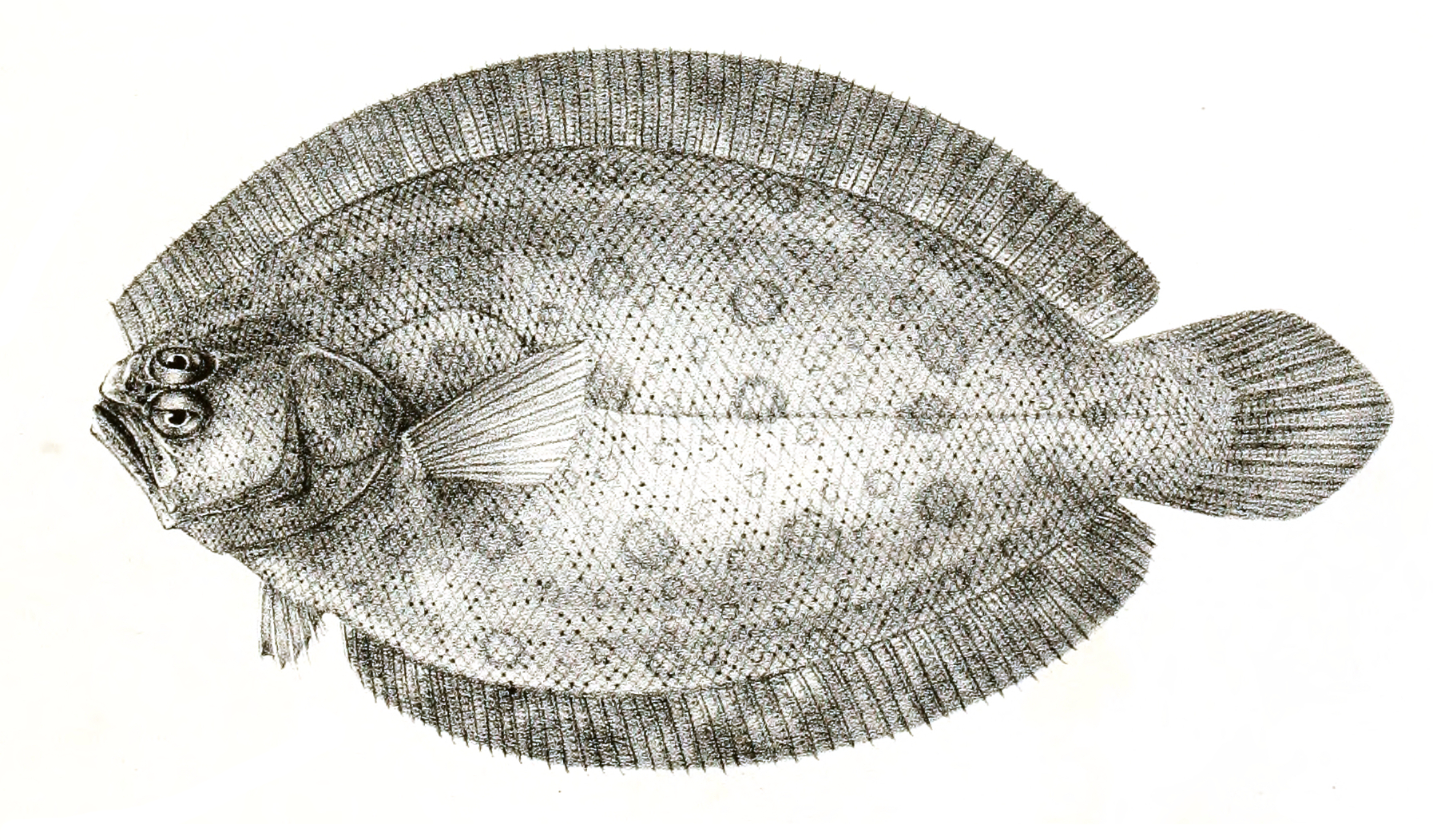
- Pseudorhombus arsius

Scientific classification
- Domain: Eukaryota
- Kingdom: Animalia
- Phylum: Chordata
- Class: Actinopterygii
- Order: Carangiformes
- Suborder: Pleuronectoidei
- Family: Paralichthyidae
- Genus: Pseudorhombus; Bleeker, 1862

Type species
- Rhombus polyspilos Bleeker 1853

Synonyms
- Istiorhombus Whitley, 1931; Neorhombus Castelnau, 1875; Rhombiscus Jordan & Snyder, 1900; Opinirhombus Ōshima, 1927; Teratorhombus Macleay, 1881

= Pseudorhombus =

Genus of fishes

Pseudorhombus is a genus of large-tooth flounders. With the exception of P. binii found off Peru, species in this genus are native to the Indo-Pacific. The largest species reaches 40 cm (16 in) in length.

== Species ==
There are currently 24 recognized species in this genus:

- Pseudorhombus annulatus Norman, 1927 (Ringed flounder)
- Pseudorhombus argus M. C. W. Weber, 1913 (Peacock flounder)
- Pseudorhombus arsius (F. Hamilton, 1822) (Largetooth flounder)
- Pseudorhombus binii Tortonese, 1955
- Pseudorhombus cinnamoneus (Temminck & Schlegel, 1846) (Cinnamon flounder)
- Pseudorhombus ctenosquamis (Ōshima, 1927)
- Pseudorhombus diplospilus Norman, 1926 (Four twin-spot flounder)
- Pseudorhombus dupliciocellatus Regan, 1905 (Ocellated flounder)
- Pseudorhombus elevatus J. D. Ogilby, 1912 (Deep flounder)
- Pseudorhombus javanicus (Bleeker, 1853) (Javan flounder)
- Pseudorhombus jenynsii (Bleeker, 1855) (Small-toothed flounder)
- Pseudorhombus levisquamis (Ōshima, 1927)
- Pseudorhombus malayanus Bleeker, 1865 (Malayan flounder)
- Pseudorhombus megalops Fowler, 1934
- Pseudorhombus micrognathus Norman, 1927
- Pseudorhombus natalensis Gilchrist, 1904 (Natal flounder)
- Pseudorhombus neglectus Bleeker, 1865
- Pseudorhombus oculocirris Amaoka, 1969
- Pseudorhombus oligodon (Bleeker, 1854) (Roughscale flounder)
- Pseudorhombus pentophthalmus Günther, 1862 (Fivespot flounder)
- Pseudorhombus quinquocellatus M. C. W. Weber & de Beaufort, 1929 (Five-eyed flounder)
- Pseudorhombus spinosus McCulloch, 1914 (Spiny flounder)
- Pseudorhombus tenuirastrum (Waite, 1899)
- Pseudorhombus triocellatus (Bloch & J. G. Schneider, 1801) (Three spotted flounder)
