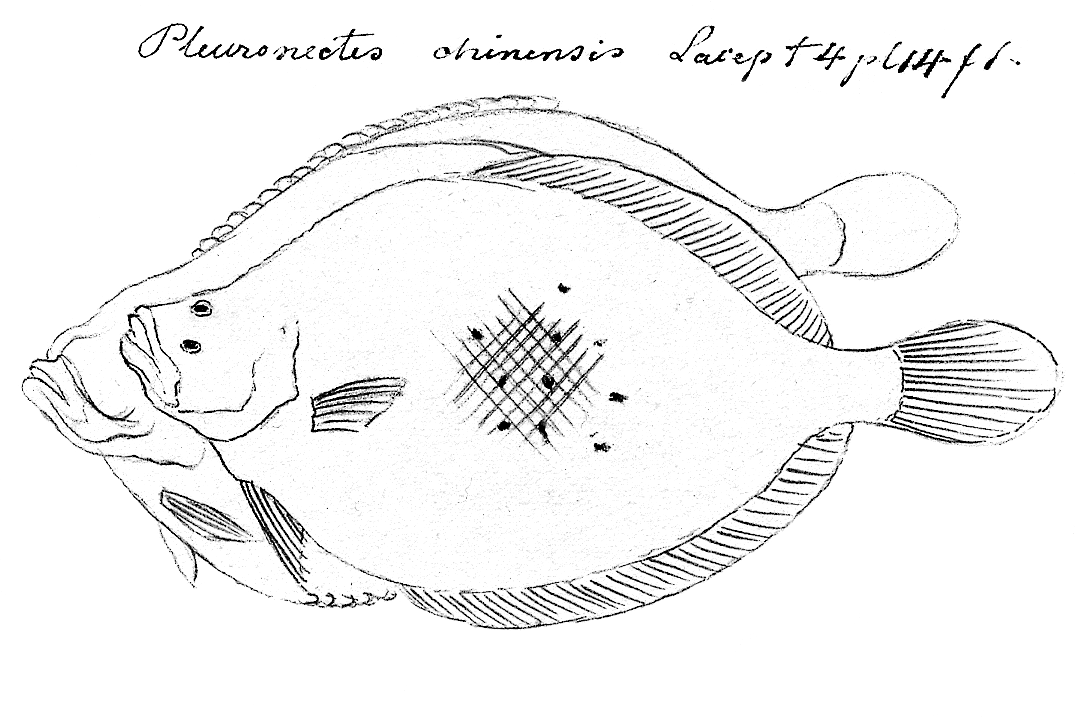

Conservation status
- Least Concern (IUCN 3.1)

Scientific classification
- Kingdom: Animalia
- Phylum: Chordata
- Class: Actinopterygii
- Order: Carangiformes
- Suborder: Pleuronectoidei
- Family: Paralichthyidae
- Genus: Tephrinectes; Günther, 1862
- Species: T. sinensis

Binomial name
- Tephrinectes sinensis (Lacépède, 1802)

Synonyms
- Paralichthys sinensis (Lacépède, 1802); Pleuronectes sinensis Lacépède, 1802

= Tephrinectes =

Genus of fishes

Tephrinectes sinensis, the Chinese brill, is a species of flatfish in the large-tooth flounder family, Paralichthyidae. It is the only member of its genus Tephrinectes. Like the rest of the large-tooth flounders, it has both eyes on the left side of its head.

It is a demersal fish that lives in sub-tropical waters. It is native to the western Pacific Ocean, from Taiwan to the coast of mainland China. It has been used in Chinese medicine and in making Shacha sauce.
