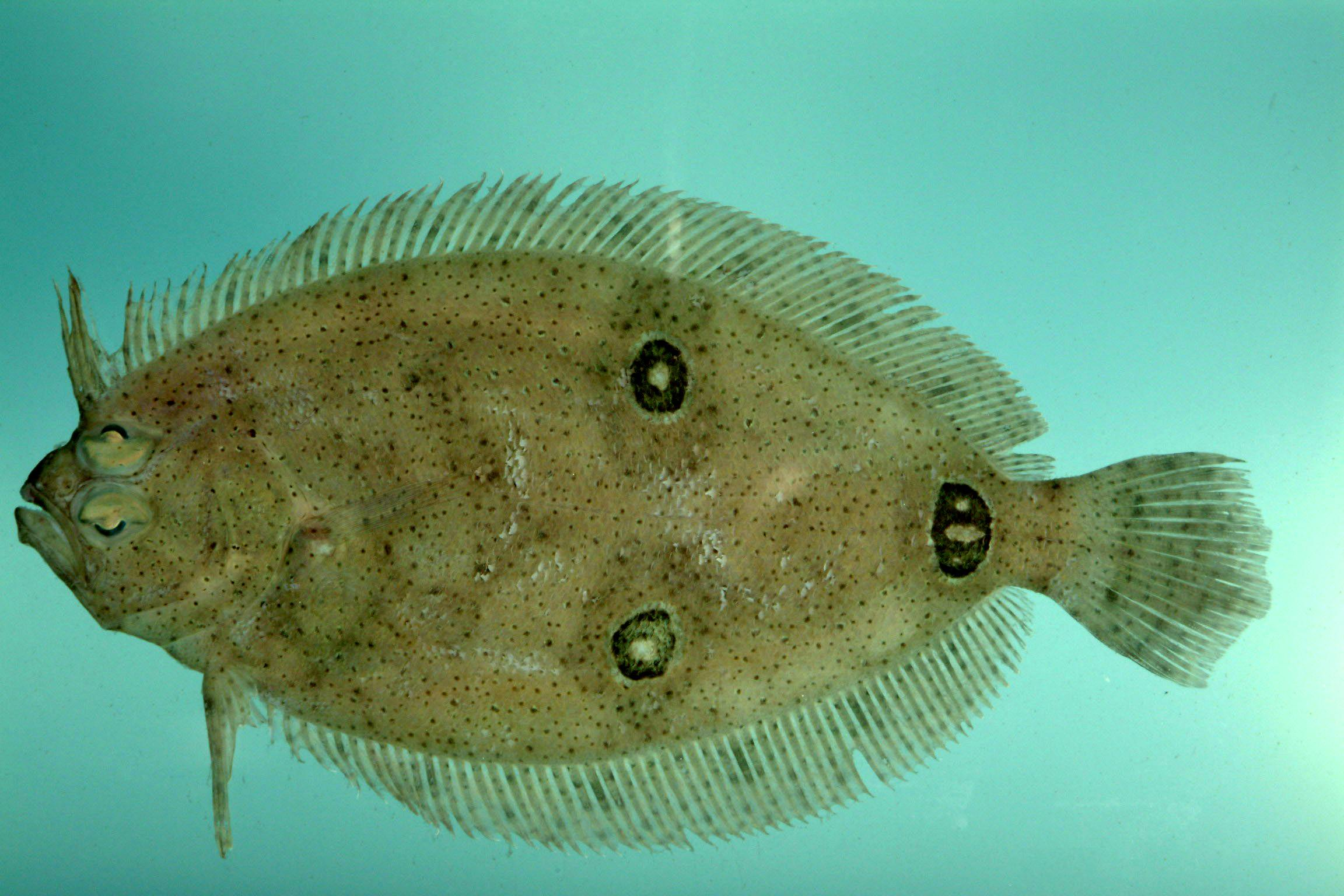
- Three-eye flounder (A. dilecta)
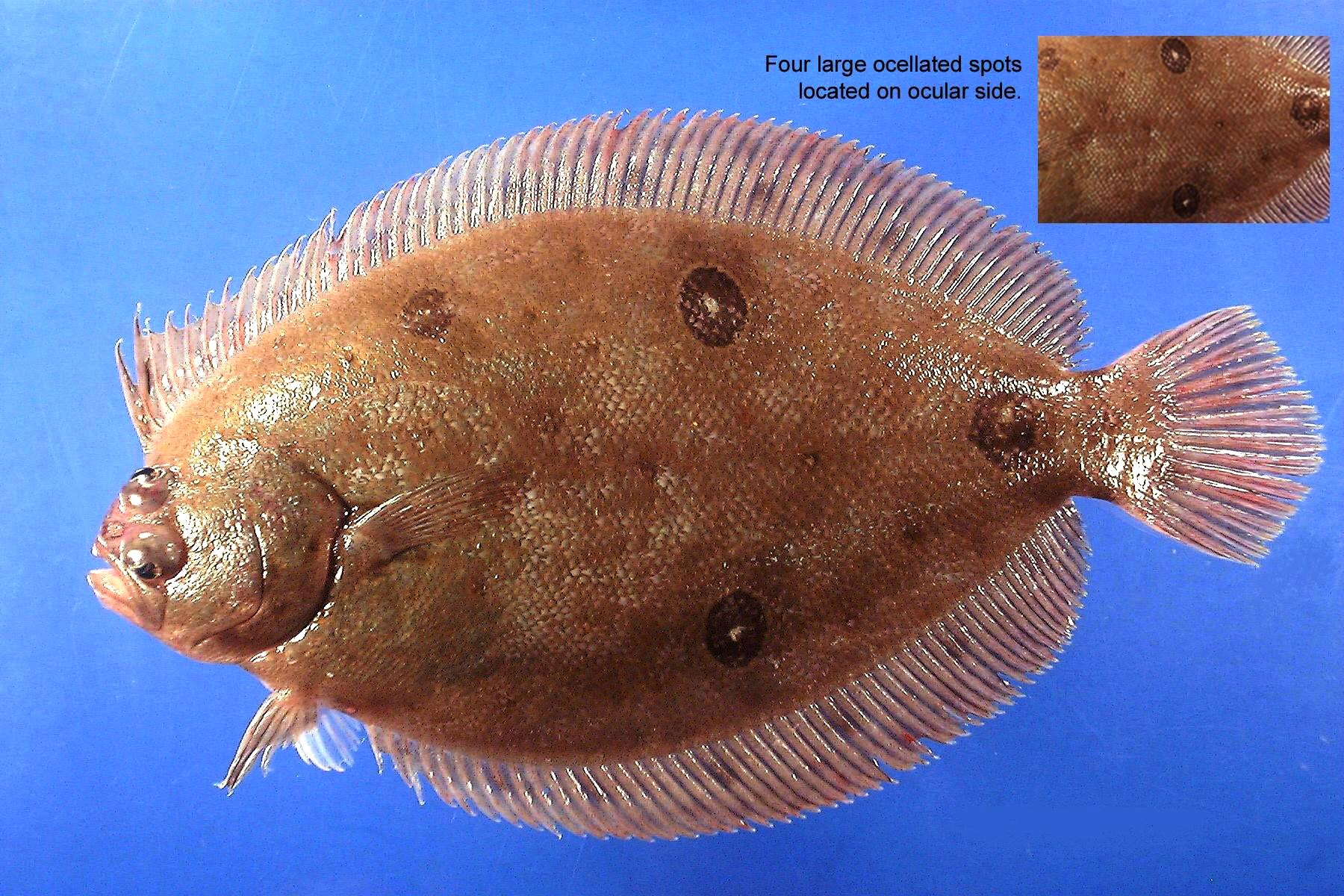
- Gulf of Mexico ocellated flounder (A. ommata)

Scientific classification
- Kingdom: Animalia
- Phylum: Chordata
- Class: Actinopterygii
- Order: Carangiformes
- Suborder: Pleuronectoidei
- Family: Paralichthyidae
- Genus: Ancylopsetta; T. N. Gill, 1864

Type species
- Ancylopsetta ommata T. N. Gill 1864

Synonyms
- Notosema Goode & Bean, 1883; Ramularia Jordan & Evermann, 1898

= Ancylopsetta =

Genus of fishes

Ancylopsetta is a genus of large-tooth flounders mostly found along the Atlantic coast of the Americas with one species found along the Pacific coast.

== Species ==
The currently recognized species in this genus are:

- Ancylopsetta antillarum Gutherz, 1966
- Ancylopsetta cycloidea J. C. Tyler, 1959 (Cyclope flounder)
- Ancylopsetta dendritica C. H. Gilbert, 1890 (three-spot flounder)
- Ancylopsetta dilecta (Goode & T. H. Bean, 1883) (three-eye flounder)
- Ancylopsetta kumperae J. C. Tyler, 1959 (four-eyed flounder)
- Ancylopsetta microctenus Gutherz, 1966
- Ancylopsetta ommata (D. S. Jordan & C. H. Gilbert, 1883) (Gulf of Mexico ocellated flounder)
