= Gastropsetta =

Conservation status
- Least Concern (IUCN 3.1)

Scientific classification
- Kingdom: Animalia
- Phylum: Chordata
- Class: Actinopterygii
- Order: Carangiformes
- Suborder: Pleuronectoidei
- Family: Paralichthyidae
- Genus: Gastropsetta; B. A. Bean, 1895
- Species: G. frontalis

Binomial name
- Gastropsetta frontalis B. A. Bean, 1895

Species of fish

Gastropsetta frontalis, the shrimp flounder, is a species of large-tooth flounder, the only member of its genus Gastropsetta. It is endemic to the western Atlantic Ocean, from North Carolina to Florida, and from the northern Gulf of Mexico to Panama. It also occurs in The Bahamas.

Gastropsetta frontalis grows to a maximum of 25 cm (9.8 in) in length, and like other large-tooth flounders has both eyes on the left side of the head. It occurs in bays and shallow waters.
