= Many eyes =

Many eyes may refer to:

- Linus's law, in software development
- Many eyes hypothesis, in vigilance, behavioral ecology

== See also ==
- Five Eyes (disambiguation)
- Many-eyed snake-eel
- Many-Eyed Ones, the ophanim, a rank of angels in Abrahamic religions
