= Pseudorhombus quinquocellatus =

Scientific classification
- Kingdom: Animalia
- Phylum: Chordata
- Class: Actinopterygii
- Division: Teleostei
- Order: Carangiformes
- Suborder: Pleuronectoidei
- Family: Paralichthyidae
- Genus: Pseudorhombus
- Species: P. quinquocellatus

Binomial name
- Pseudorhombus quinquocellatus M. C. W. Weber & de Beaufort, 1929

Species of fish

Pseudorhombus quinquocellatus, the five-eyed flounder, is a species of flatfish in the large-tooth flounder family, Paralichthyidae. It is a demersal fish that lives in tropical waters, inhabiting deep waters on the continental shelf of the western Pacific Ocean, from Taiwan in the north to Australia in the south.

Like the rest of the large-tooth flounders, it has both eyes on the left side of its head. It grows to around 20 centimetres (7.9 in) in length. It is brownish in colour, with five dark rings on its ocular side, as suggested by its common name.
