= Tarphops =

Scientific classification
- Kingdom: Animalia
- Phylum: Chordata
- Class: Actinopterygii
- Order: Carangiformes
- Suborder: Pleuronectoidei
- Family: Paralichthyidae
- Genus: Tarphops; D. S. Jordan & W. F. Thompson, 1914

Type species
- Rhombus oligolepis Bleeker, 1859

Genus of fishes

Tarphops is a genus of large-tooth flounders native to the northwest Pacific Ocean.

== Species ==
The currently recognized species in this genus are:

- Tarphops elegans Amaoka, 1969
- Tarphops oligolepis (Bleeker, 1858)
