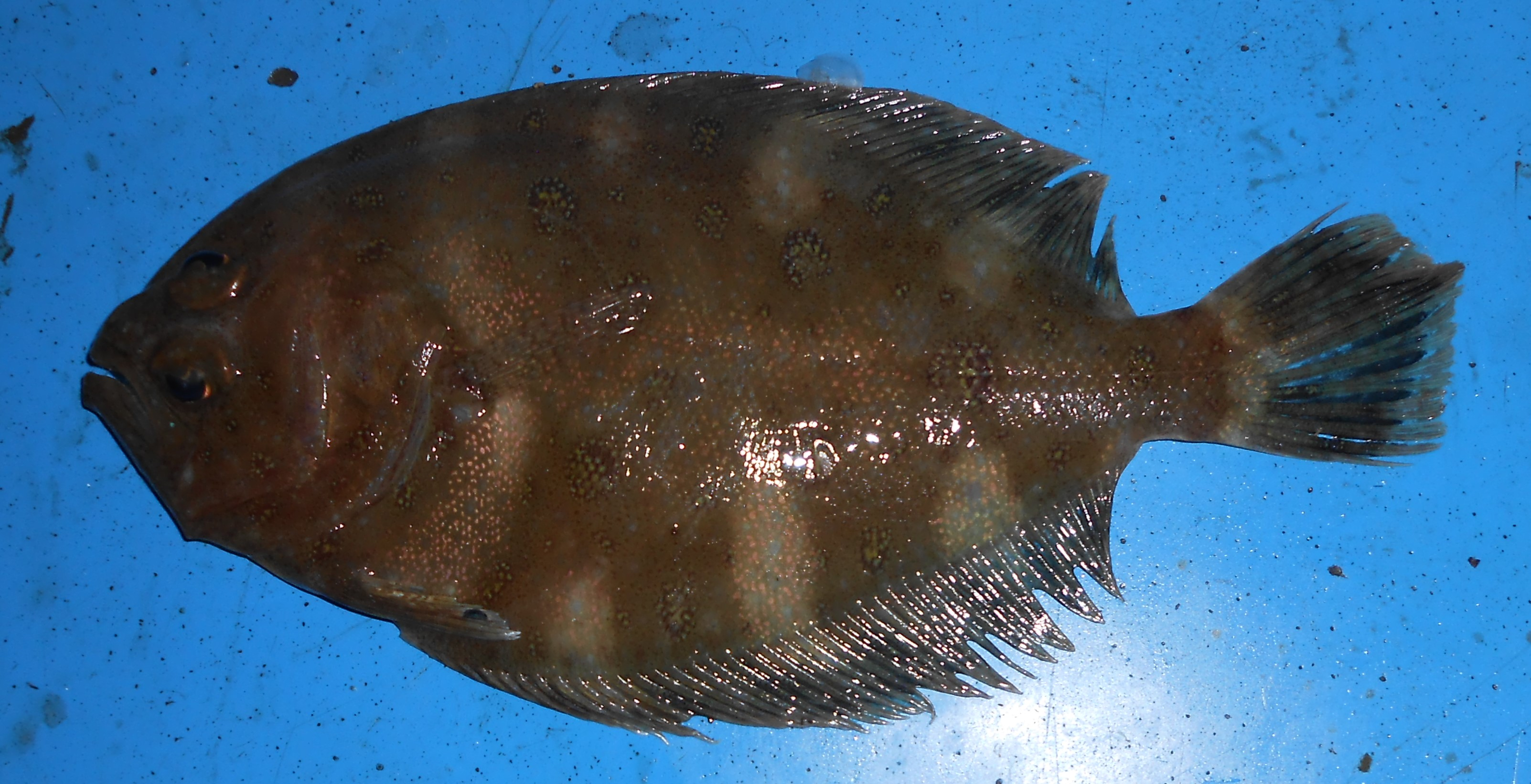

Scientific classification
- Domain: Eukaryota
- Kingdom: Animalia
- Phylum: Chordata
- Class: Actinopterygii
- Order: Carangiformes
- Suborder: Pleuronectoidei
- Family: Paralichthyidae
- Genus: Cephalopsetta; Dutt & Hanumantha Rao, 1965
- Species: C. ventrocellatus

Binomial name
- Cephalopsetta ventrocellatus Dutt & Hanumantha Rao, 1965

= Cephalopsetta ventrocellatus =

Species of fish

Cephalopsetta ventrocellatus is a species of large-tooth flounder native to the Indian Ocean, from the Gulf of Oman in the west to the Andaman Sea in the east. Little else is known about this species. It is the only known member of its genus.
