= Xystreurys =

Scientific classification
- Kingdom: Animalia
- Phylum: Chordata
- Class: Actinopterygii
- Division: Teleostei
- Order: Carangiformes
- Suborder: Pleuronectoidei
- Family: Paralichthyidae
- Genus: Xystreurys; D. S. Jordan & C. H. Gilbert, 1880

Type species
- Xystreurys liolepis Jordan & Gilbert, 1880

Synonyms
- Verecundum Jordan, 1891

Genus of fishes

Xystreurys rasile

Xystreurys is a genus of large-tooth flounders with one species, X. liolepis, found along the Pacific coast of North America from Monterey Bay, California to the Gulf of California and the other, X. rasile, found along the Atlantic coast of South America from Rio de Janeiro, Brazil to the southern tip of Argentina.

== Species ==
There are currently two recognized species in this genus:

- Xystreurys liolepis D. S. Jordan & C. H. Gilbert, 1880 (Fantail flounder)
- Xystreurys rasile (D. S. Jordan, 1891)
