= Evesthes =

Evesthes Temporal range: Upper Miocene

Scientific classification
- Domain: Eukaryota
- Kingdom: Animalia
- Phylum: Chordata
- Class: Actinopterygii
- Order: Carangiformes
- Suborder: Pleuronectoidei
- Family: Paralichthyidae
- Genus: †Evesthes; Gilbert, 1910
- Species: †E. jordani

Binomial name
- †Evesthes jordani Gilbert, 1910

Synonyms
- †E. hooveri Jordan in Jordan & Gilbert, 1920

Extinct genus of fishes

Evesthes is an extinct genus of prehistoric largetooth flounder that lived during the Upper Miocene subepoch. It contains a single species, E. jordani (named after David Starr Jordan), that lived off the coast of what is now Southern California during the Tortonian stage. Articulated fossil remains are known from diatomite beds of the Monterey Formation near Lompoc, where they appear to be rather common. A second alleged species, E. hooveri Jordan in Jordan & Gilbert, 1920 is known from only fragmentary remains and is most likely synonymous with E. jordani.

== See also ==
- Prehistoric fish
- List of prehistoric bony fish
