= Thysanopsetta =

Scientific classification
- Kingdom: Animalia
- Phylum: Chordata
- Class: Actinopterygii
- Division: Teleostei
- Order: Carangiformes
- Suborder: Pleuronectoidei
- Family: Paralichthyidae
- Genus: Thysanopsetta; Günther, 1880
- Species: T. naresi

Binomial name
- Thysanopsetta naresi Günther, 1880

Genus of fishes

Thysanopsetta naresi is a species of flatfish in the large-tooth flounder family, Paralichthyidae. It is the only member of its genus Thysanopsetta. Thysanopsetta naresi is a demersal fish that lives in temperate waters at depths of between 90 and 170 metres (300 and 560 ft). It can be found in the southeast Pacific Ocean, off the coast of Chile, and in the southwest Atlantic Ocean in Patagonia and in the Falkland region. It grows to around 15.1 centimetres (5.9 in) in length.

It is brownish, mottled and spotted with darker patches. Like the rest of the large-tooth flounders, it has both eyes on the left side of its head.
