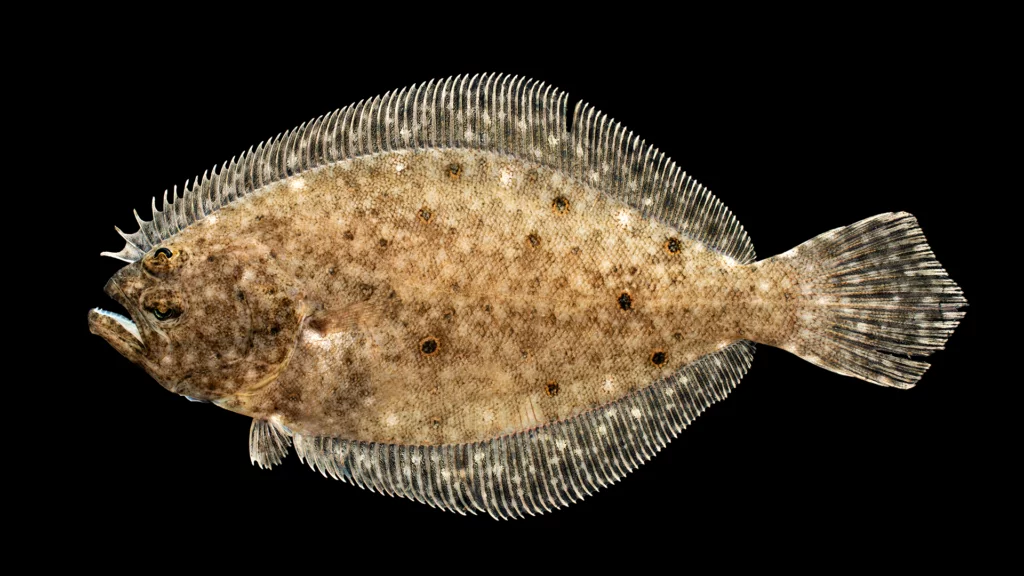
- Summer flounder (Paralichthys dentatus)

Scientific classification
- Kingdom: Animalia
- Phylum: Chordata
- Class: Actinopterygii
- Order: Carangiformes
- Suborder: Pleuronectoidei
- Family: Paralichthyidae; Regan, 1910

Type genus
- Paralichthys Girard, 1858

Genera
- See text

= Paralichthyidae =

Large-tooth flounders Temporal range: Miocene–present

Family of fishes

Large-tooth flounders or sand flounders are a family, Paralichthyidae, of flounders. The family contains 14 genera with a total of about 110 species. They lie on the sea bed on their right side; both eyes are always on the left side of the head, while the Pleuronectidae usually (but not always) have their eyes on the right side of the head.

They are found in temperate and tropical waters of the Atlantic, Indian and Pacific Oceans. Several species are important commercial and game fishes, notably the California halibut, Paralichthys californicus.

== Taxonomy ==
The following genera are placed in this family:

- Ancylopsetta
- Cephalopsetta
- Gastropsetta
- Hippoglossina
- Paralichthys
- Pseudorhombus
- Tarphops
- Tephrinectes
- Thysanopsetta
- Xystreurys

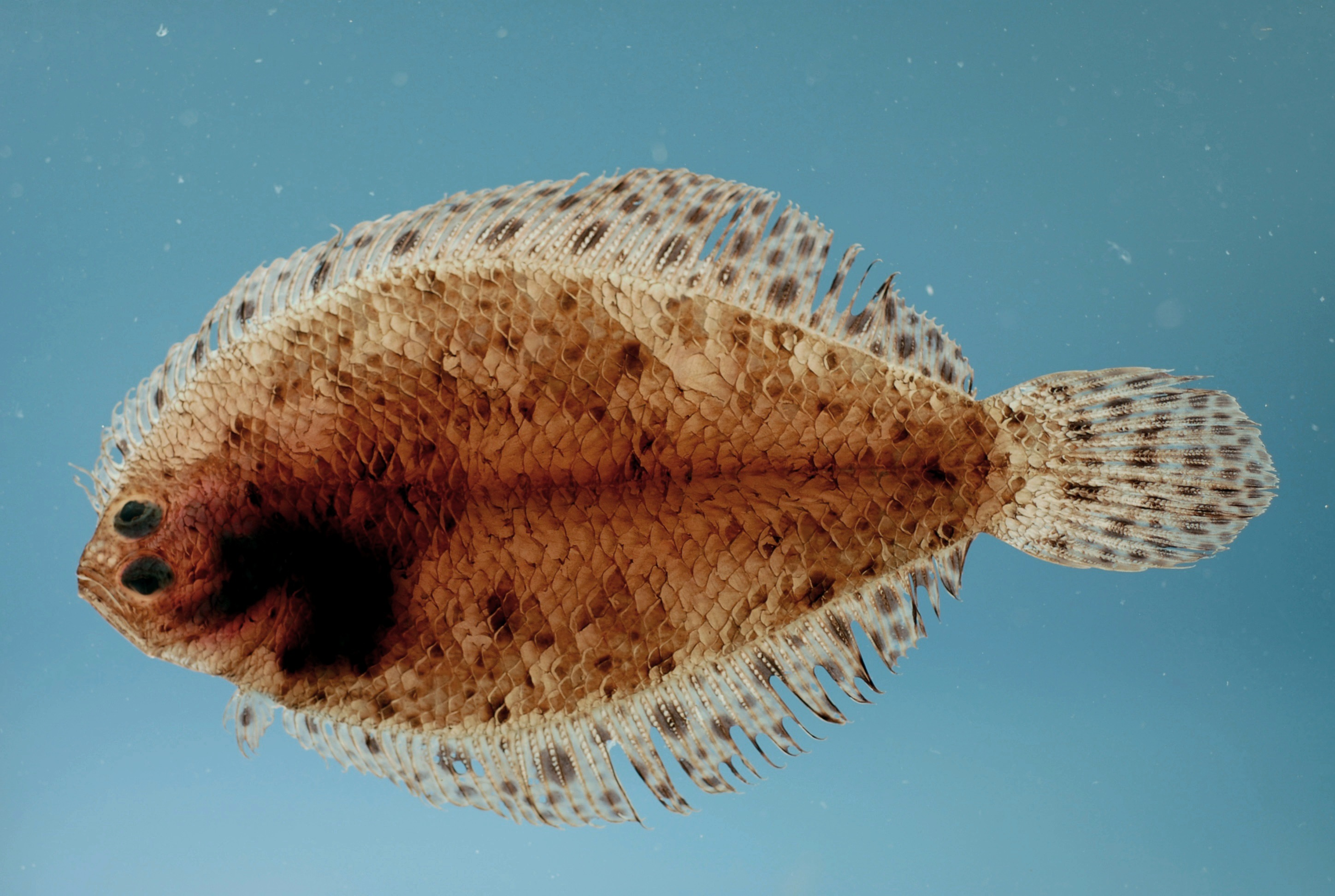
Bigeye flounder, Hippoglossina macrops

One extinct fossil genus is known in †Evesthes from the Late Miocene of California, USA.

Phylogenetic analyses have long indicated the non-monophyly of this family in the traditional sense, and two lineages have been consistently apparent. Termed groups, the two groups were named after genera: a Cyclopsetta group and a Pseudorhombus group. The "Cyclopsetta group" was formally described as Cyclopsettidae in 2019, consisting of four genera: Cyclopsetta, Etropus, Citharichthys, and Syacium. Molecular phylogenetic evidence indicates that Paralichthyidae in this sense is sister to Pleuronectidae and Cyclopsettidae is sister to Bothidae.
