= Whiff =

Whiff is a common name for various species of flatfish. It may refer to:

- Whiff or Megrim (Lepidorhombus whiffiagonis), a species of flatfish in the family Scophthalmidae
- Anglefin whiff (Citharichthys gymnorhinus), a species of flatfish in the family Paralichthyidae
- Horned whiff (Citharichthys cornutus), a species of flatfish in the family Paralichthyidae
- Sand whiff (Citharichthys arenaceus), a species of flatfish in the family Paralichthyidae
- Veracruz whiff (Citharichthys abbotti), a species of flatfish in the family Paralichthyidae

== Other uses ==
- Whiff (Thomas & Friends), fictional steam locomotive
- Whiff (baseball), a baseball term
- A stroke in multiple sports, including golf and tennis, whereby the player misses the ball completely
- An odor
- One or more possible whiffs of oxygen before the great oxidation event

== See also ==
- WIFF (disambiguation)
