= Wiffle (disambiguation) =

Wiffle ball is a variation of baseball, and a plastic ball is used in the game.

Wiffle, Wiffle ball or Whiffle may also refer to:

- Wiffle, a measurement the size of a Wiffle ball
- Wiffle Ball (video game)
- Buzz cut or Wiffle cut, a hair style
- Whiffle, a pinball machine

== See also ==
- WFL (disambiguation)
- WIFL (disambiguation)
- WIFF (disambiguation)
- Waffle (disambiguation)
