= C. cornutus =

C. cornutus may refer to:

- Cerastes cornutus, a viper species
- Cotylurus cornutus, a helminth species
- Chaetoceros cornutus, a diatom species in the genus Chaetoceros
- Citharichthys cornutus, a flounder species in the genus Citharichthys
- Corydalus cornutus, a dobsonfly species in the genus Corydalus
- Craspedochiton cornutus, a chiton species in the genus Craspedochiton
- Culex cornutus, a mosquito species in the genus Culex

== See also ==
- Cornutus (disambiguation)
