= C. xanthostigma =

C. xanthostigma may refer to:

- Chlorostoma xanthostigma, a sea snail species
- Citharichthys xanthostigma, the longfin sanddab, a flatfish species
