= Citharichthys amblybregmatus =

Conservation status
- Data Deficient (IUCN 3.1)

Scientific classification
- Kingdom: Animalia
- Phylum: Chordata
- Class: Actinopterygii
- Order: Carangiformes
- Suborder: Pleuronectoidei
- Family: Cyclopsettidae
- Genus: Citharichthys
- Species: C. amblybregmatus

Binomial name
- Citharichthys amblybregmatus Gutherz & Blackman, 1970

Species of fish

Citharichthys amblybregmatus is a species of flatfish in the large-tooth flounder family Paralichthyidae. It is native to the western north Atlantic Ocean. It has been collected at a depth of 198 m (650 ft).

It is a demersal fish. Like the rest of the large-tooth flounders, it has both eyes on the left side of its head. The species was described at the same time as the anglefin whiff. Both species display sexual dimorphism, with the males displaying several secondary sex characteristics, making both species similar to the previously described horned whiff (Citharichthys cornutus).
