= Citharichthys gordae =

Conservation status
- Data Deficient (IUCN 3.1)

Scientific classification
- Kingdom: Animalia
- Phylum: Chordata
- Class: Actinopterygii
- Order: Carangiformes
- Suborder: Pleuronectoidei
- Family: Cyclopsettidae
- Genus: Citharichthys
- Species: C. gordae

Binomial name
- Citharichthys gordae Beebe & Tee-Van, 1938

Species of fish

Citharichthys gordae, the mimic sanddab, is a species of sanddab in the large-tooth flounder family Paralichthyidae. It is native to the eastern Pacific Ocean, found off the coast of Mexico. It has a limited distribution, found in the Magdalena Bay and along the Baja California peninsula, as well as part of the Gulf of California.

It is a demersal fish that lives in sandy or muddy bottoms of tropical waters, at depths of between 73 and 146 metres (240 and 479 ft). Like the rest of the large-tooth flounders, the mimic sanddab has both eyes on the left side of its head. It grows to a maximum length of around 14 centimetres (5.5 in). It is a brownish color, mottled with darker patches.
