= Citharichthys fragilis =

Conservation status
- Least Concern (IUCN 3.1)

Scientific classification
- Kingdom: Animalia
- Phylum: Chordata
- Class: Actinopterygii
- Order: Carangiformes
- Suborder: Pleuronectoidei
- Family: Cyclopsettidae
- Genus: Citharichthys
- Species: C. fragilis

Binomial name
- Citharichthys fragilis C. H. Gilbert, 1890

Species of fish

Citharichthys fragilis, the Gulf sanddab, is a species of sanddab in the large-tooth flounder family Paralichthyidae. It is native to the eastern Pacific Ocean, ranging from the coast of Manhattan Beach, California in the north to the Gulf of California in the south.

This demersal marine fish lives in tropical waters, inhabiting sandy bottoms at depths between 18 and 347 m (59 and 1,138 ft). Like the rest of the large-tooth flounders, it has both eyes on the left side of its head. It is a small fish, growing to around 10 cm (3.9 in). It is brownish in colour, both the body and fins are mottled with darker patches. Its underside is a pale colour.

It is a game fish of minor commercial importance.

Citharichthys fragilis preys on crustaceans, benthic worms, and small bony fishes.

== Notes ==
- Froese, Rainer; Pauly, Daniel (eds.). "Citharichthys fragilis". FishBase. September 2009 version.
