= Citharichthys platophrys =

Conservation status
- Least Concern (IUCN 3.1)

Scientific classification
- Kingdom: Animalia
- Phylum: Chordata
- Class: Actinopterygii
- Order: Carangiformes
- Suborder: Pleuronectoidei
- Family: Cyclopsettidae
- Genus: Citharichthys
- Species: C. platophrys

Binomial name
- Citharichthys platophrys C. H. Gilbert, 1891

Species of fish

Citharichthys platophrys, the small sanddab, is a species of sanddab in the large-tooth flounder family Paralichthyidae. It is native to the eastern Pacific Ocean, ranging from the southern Gulf of California of Mexico in the north to Peru in the south.

It is a demersal marine fish that lives in tropical waters, inhabiting sandy bottoms at depths between 11 and 54 metres (36 and 177 ft). Like the rest of the large-tooth flounders, it has both eyes on the left side of its head. It is small fish, growing to around 10 centimetres (3.9 in).

It is a commercial fish, sold fresh and may also be processed for use in fish meal.
