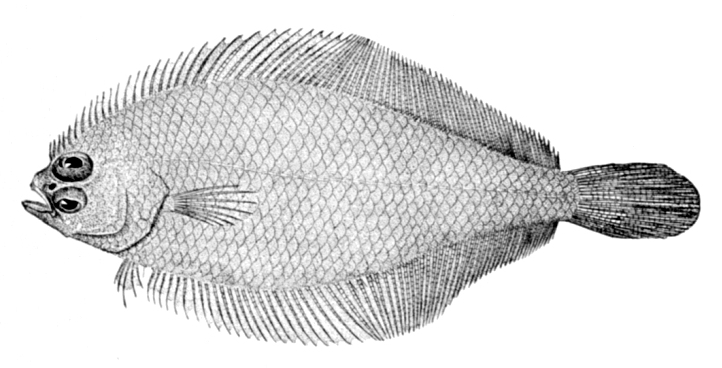

Conservation status
- Least Concern (IUCN 3.1)

Scientific classification
- Kingdom: Animalia
- Phylum: Chordata
- Class: Actinopterygii
- Order: Carangiformes
- Suborder: Pleuronectoidei
- Family: Cyclopsettidae
- Genus: Citharichthys
- Species: C. arctifrons

Binomial name
- Citharichthys arctifrons Goode, 1880

= Citharichthys arctifrons =

Species of fish

The Gulf Stream flounder (Citharichthys arctifrons) is a species of fish belonging to the family Paralichthyidae native to waters off eastern North America.

== Description ==
The Gulf Stream flounder is a lefteyed flatfish whose mouth that lies about adjacent to its eyes. The defining characteristic of the Gulf Stream flounder is its large scales, which number about 40 on its lateral line. The left pectoral fin is noticeably longer than the right side pectoral fin. The pelvic fins are of equal size in female members of the species, but the right fin is larger in males. The fish is brown on the visible side of its body, and white on its blind side. It is colored dark brown on the upper side of its body, and a brownish white on the lower part of its body.

== Distribution and habitat ==
The species is found from George's Bank to southern Florida.
