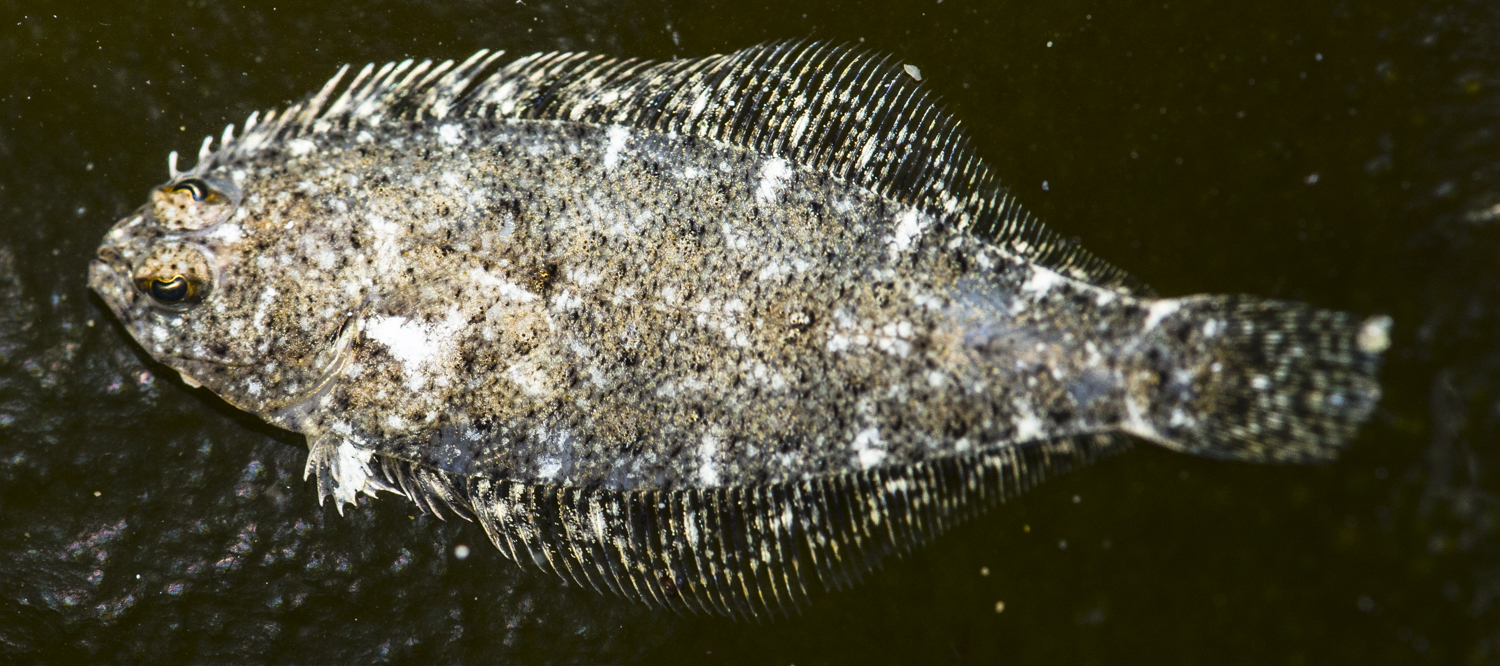

Scientific classification
- Kingdom: Animalia
- Phylum: Chordata
- Class: Actinopterygii
- Order: Carangiformes
- Suborder: Pleuronectoidei
- Family: Cyclopsettidae
- Genus: Citharichthys
- Species: C. stigmaeus

Binomial name
- Citharichthys stigmaeus D. S. Jordan & C. H. Gilbert, 1882

= Citharichthys stigmaeus =

Species of fish

Citharichthys stigmaeus, the speckled sanddab, is a species of lefteye Blothid flounder in the genus Citharichthys. It is native to the eastern Pacific Ocean, ranging from Alaska in the north to Baja California, Mexico in the south. It is usually found in benthic habitats, in both bays and coastal areas. It varies temporarily both seasonally and annually. It is often found highest in abundance during the spring and summer (due to a large number of juveniles), but are found in much lower densities in the winter.

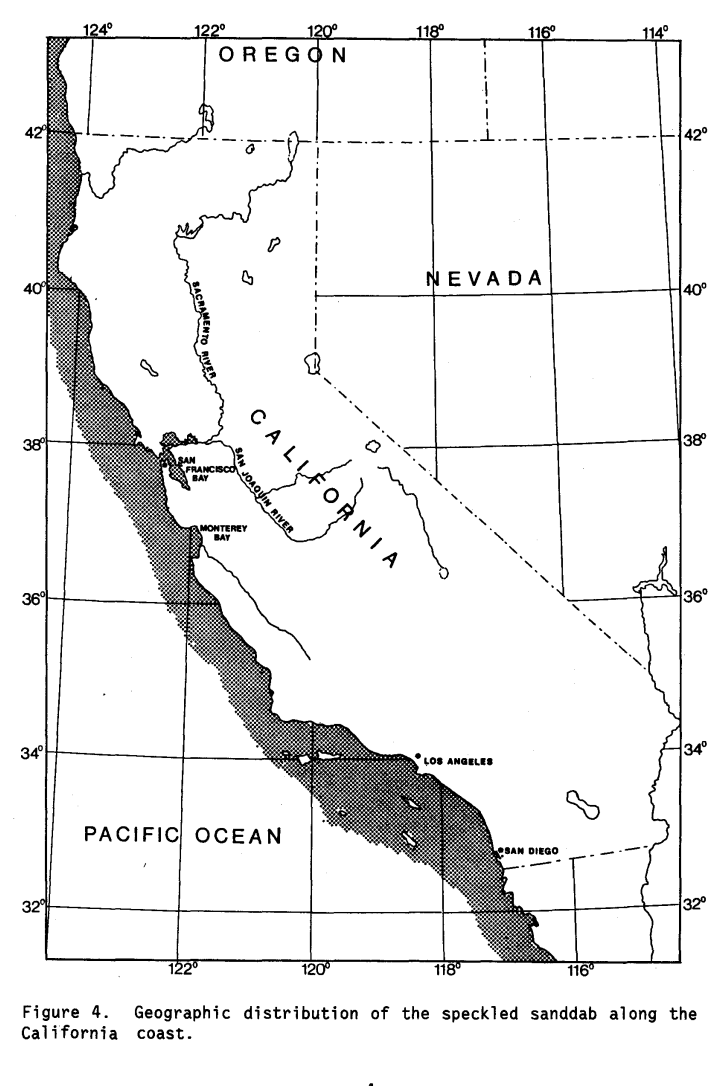
Geographic distribution of the speckled sanddab along the California coast.

While the Speckled sanddab is technically a game fish, it is of little commercial importance due to its diminutive size, and the larger Pacific sanddab is readily available. The species has a high rate of reproduction, and coupled with the minimal threat from fishing means that it is abundant along the entire North American coast. Over the past few decades, due to its abundance, it has been used in various studies throughout the coast to analyse benthic species distribution and feeding habits.

== Description ==
It is a much smaller cousin of the Pacific sanddab (C. sordidus), growing to a maximum of 17 centimetres (6.7 in) in length. It can be found on the sandy bottom near the shore to as far out as 350 metres (1,150 ft). It is a dull brown or tan colour, with a white or pale brown underside. Males are often mottled with orange spots. It is not to be mistaken with the English sole, which also has similar appearance due to its compressed body form and similar body proportions (including caudal lengths). The main difference between the Speckled sanddab and the English sole lies in their mouth and jaw structures, which also causes them to have slightly varied diets. The Speckled sanddab has both eyes on the left side of its body, with symmetrical jaws and asymmetrical pelvic fins. The Pacific sanddab can be distinguished from other similar Citharichthys species, the Speckled sanddab does not develop rays during its developmental stages.

== Life history ==
The Speckled sanddab animalia kingdom, the phylum chordata and part of the actinopterygii class. The morphology of the Speckled sanddab is thought to have originated from one common ancestor as a part of a monophyletic group, but the development of the same-side eye placement has been contested over time. In 2008, a study rediscovered two intermediate species, Amphistium paradoxum and Heteronectes chaneti, which were previously neglected. These species had eyes that had migrated upwards, proving that the evolution of the same-sided eyes was a gradual evolutionary shift, rather than a single event.

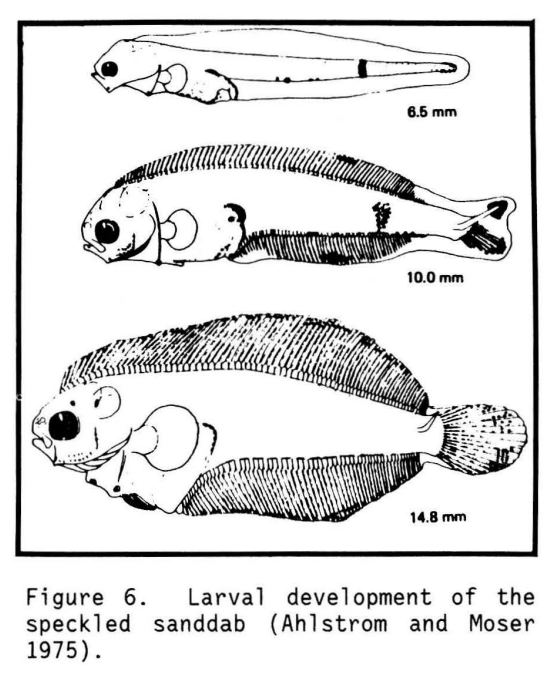
Larval Development of the Speckled sanddab (Ahlstrom and Moser 1975)

Juveniles are largely found in shallow, coastal, sandy habitats for the spring and summer of their first year (first growth season). They utilise both coasts and bays as nursery habitats. Although they are mostly found relatively close to the coast, they do not necessarily depend on shallow waters for nursing grounds, as they can also be found in deep channels. Citharichthys lay eggs that are spherical and contain oil globules that develop from singular to several over the course of maturity. Juveniles mature rapidly and have a short pelagic stage. They reach maturity at a generally smaller body size than many other flatfish, which is advantageous for nursing in more tumultuous coastal environments. At the end of the first growth season, juveniles move further offshore to join the adult population in more offshore pelagic habitats.

== Ecology and behaviour ==
One of the main defensive mechanisms the species has is that it can camouflage itself by adapting to look like the surface it is on. This allows the species to avoid being seen in murkier benthic environments by blending in with the surrounding sediment. It has various anti-predator responses, mostly evasive, and tends to be more reserved with predation and feeding when there are predators present. It varies its posture and movement depending on the presence or absence of food and predator cues.

The Speckled sanddab may be one of the more resilient flatfish species, as one study conducted in 2017 exposed it to varying levels of CO_{2} and assessed their responses accordingly. It showed potential resilience to CO_{2} and may be generally better equipped to tackle ocean acidification. However, it was found that after exposure to high levels of CO_{2}, it was slower to demonstrate successful feeding habits. Other studies have also been conducted to show that the Speckled sanddab may be more sensitive than other California fish species to marine habitats with increased sulfide concentrations, as they are unable to effectively detoxify sulfide through oxidation, which may reflect a smaller environmental niche.

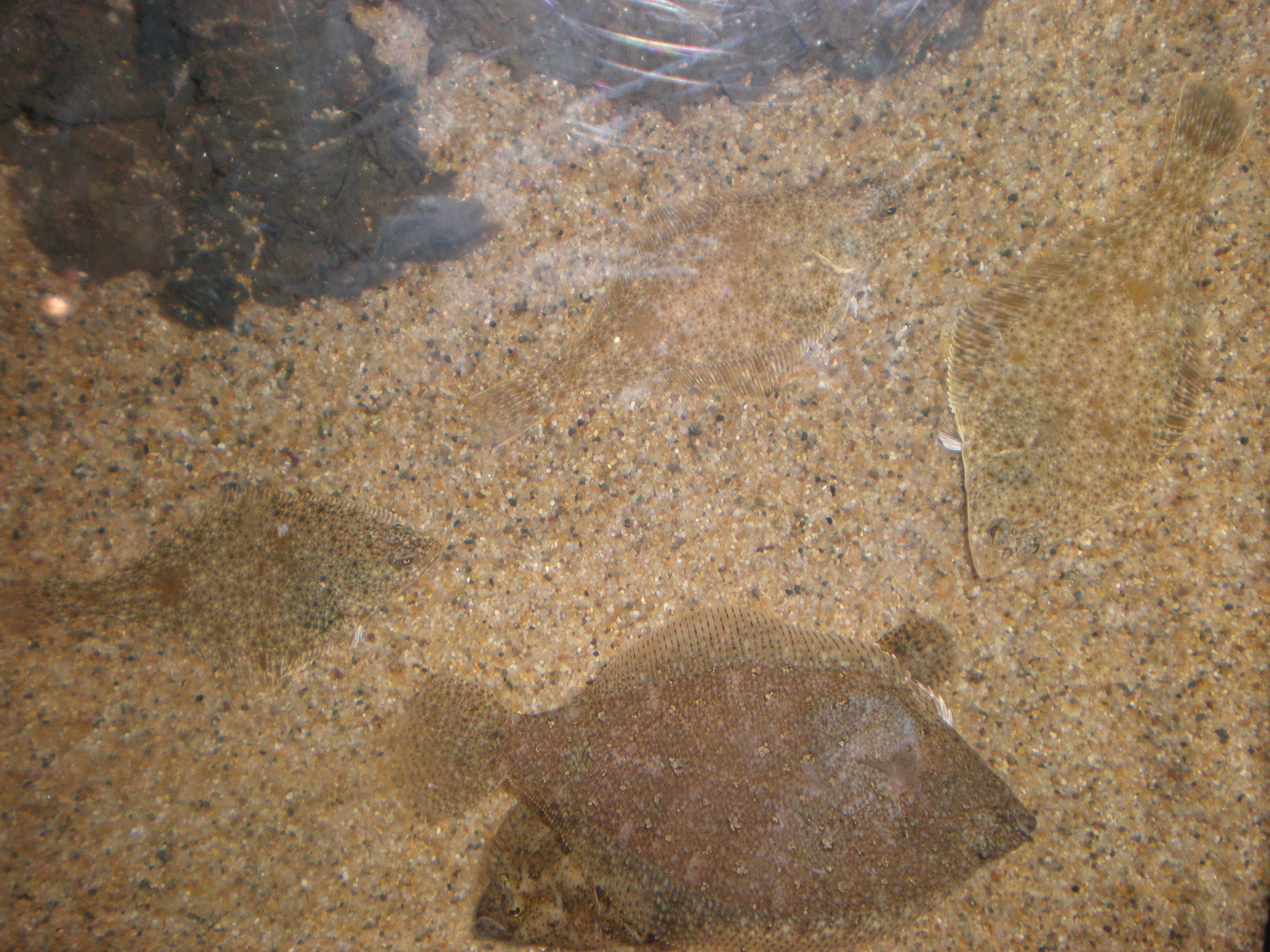
Well-hidden speckled sanddabs at the Steinhart Aquarium

== Diet ==
The Speckled sanddab feeds on both epibenthic and benthic organisms throughout the water column. Its mouth is equipped with a moderate mouth, long symmetrical jaw, sharp teeth and serrated gill rakers in order to aid the mechanical breakdown of prey. It eats small crustaceans, polychaetes, bivalve siphons, copopods, mysids, caprellids, cumaceans, shrimp, crab and other smaller fish. Its predators are various fish, birds and marine mammals. A study done in 1965 found that halibut were responsible for around 78% of monthly Speckled sanddab mortalities in the San Diego County. As the species grows larger in size, it is able to diversify its diet further and consume a larger variety of prey.

== Conservation status ==
The Speckled sanddab has experienced various ecological and anthropogenic threats over the past few decades. In the 1980s, sanddabs experienced increased parasitism, infection and mortality rates, due to factors like water temperature fluctuation, pollution and human interference. Over time, its conservation status has shifted due to variations in external threats. In 2020, the International Union for Conservation of Nature declared it as ‘Least Concern’ status as it is both not endangered, harmless to humans, and only minorly used for commercial purposes. Although the species in itself is not necessarily endangered, biogeographical shifts to the coastline are occurring due to climate change, which may alter the composition of habitats like estuaries and bays. As these coastal shifts continue to occur, the Speckled sanddab may struggle to find sufficient nursing grounds for development and protection, putting the population at risk.
