= C. abbotti =

C. abbotti may refer to:

- Chlorocnemis abbotti, a damselfly species
- Cinnyris sovimanga, the souimanga sunbird, a bird species
- Citharichthys abbotti, the Veracruz whiff, a flatfish species
- Coracina abbotti, the pygmy cuckooshrike, a bird species
