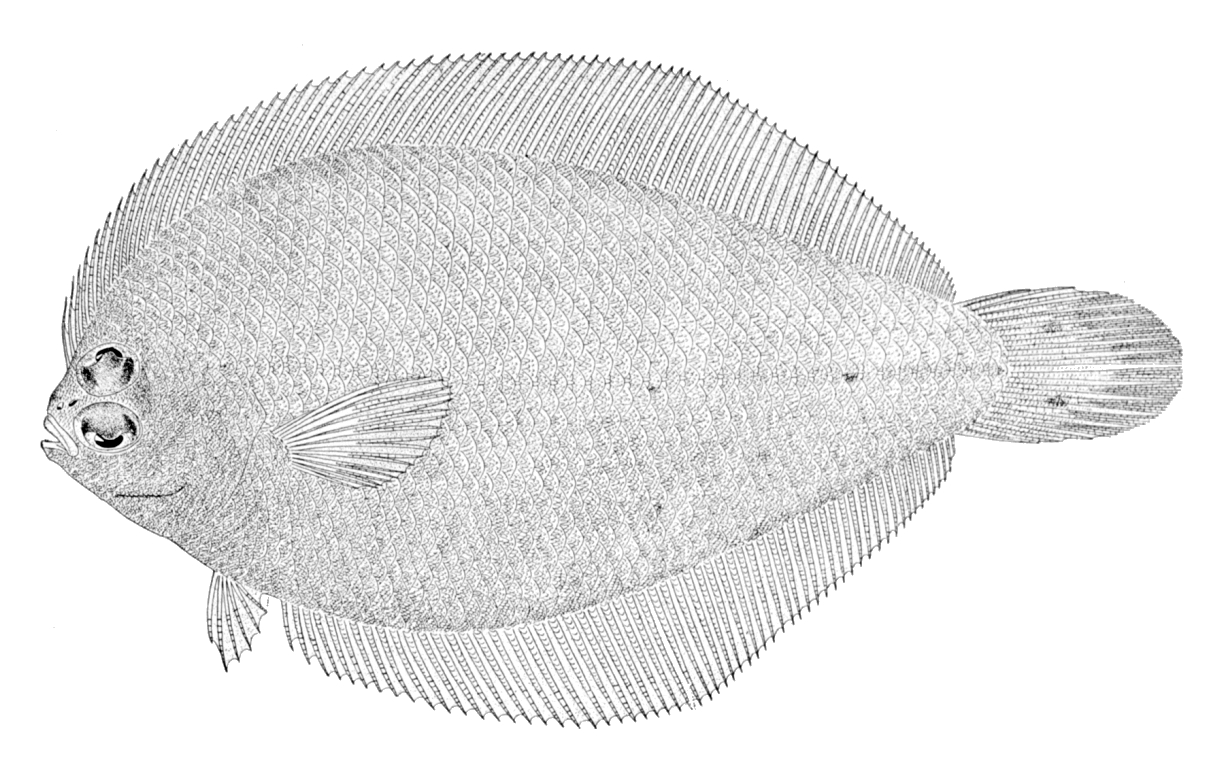

Conservation status
- Least Concern (IUCN 3.1)

Scientific classification
- Kingdom: Animalia
- Phylum: Chordata
- Class: Actinopterygii
- Order: Carangiformes
- Suborder: Pleuronectoidei
- Family: Cyclopsettidae
- Genus: Etropus
- Species: E. rimosus

Binomial name
- Etropus rimosus Goode & T. H. Bean, 1885

= Etropus rimosus =

Species of fish

Etropus rimosus, the gray flounder, is a species of flounder in the large-tooth flounder family Paralichthyidae. It is native to the western Atlantic Ocean, ranging from the coast of North Carolina to the south of Florida. It can also be found in the eastern Gulf of Mexico.

It is a demersal fish that lives in sub-tropical waters, at depths between 7 and 180 metres (23 and 591 ft). It grows to a maximum length of around 13 centimetres (5.1 in). Like the rest of the large-tooth flounders, it has both eyes on the left side of its head.
