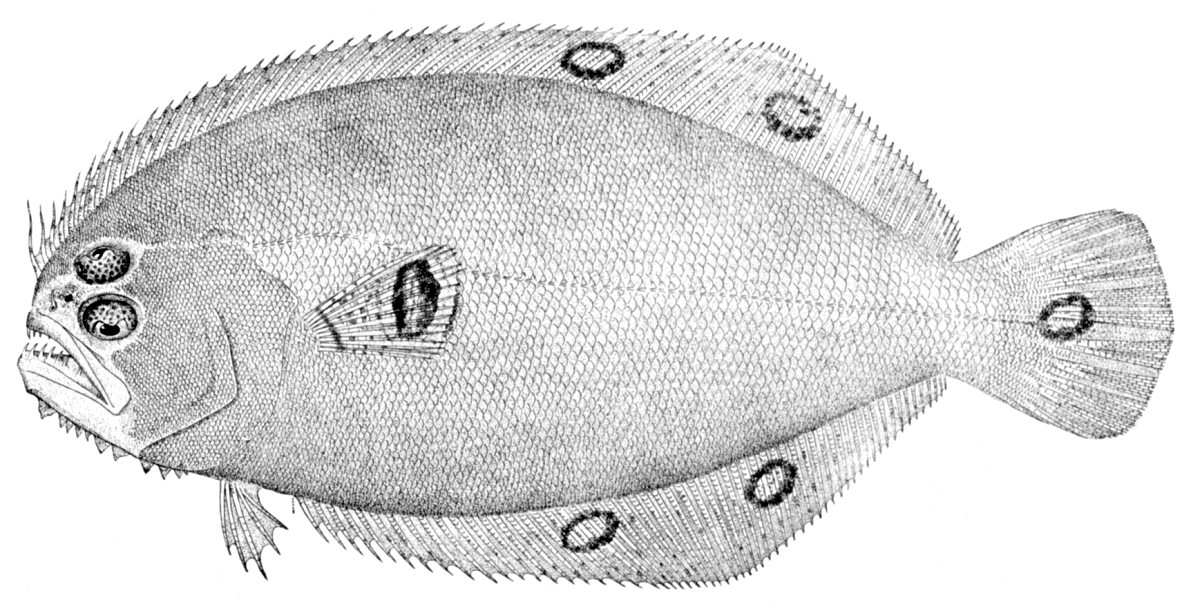

Conservation status
- Least Concern (IUCN 3.1)

Scientific classification
- Kingdom: Animalia
- Phylum: Chordata
- Class: Actinopterygii
- Order: Carangiformes
- Suborder: Pleuronectoidei
- Family: Cyclopsettidae
- Genus: Cyclopsetta
- Species: C. fimbriata

Binomial name
- Cyclopsetta fimbriata (Goode & T. H. Bean, 1885)

= Cyclopsetta fimbriata =

Species of fish

Cyclopsetta fimbriata, the spotfin flounder, is a species of large-tooth flounder native to the western Atlantic Ocean. It ranges along the Eastern coast of North America, from North Carolina in the north to the coast of Brazil in the south. It is abundant around the coast of Florida and in the Gulf of Mexico. It can be found among reefs and has a depth range of 20–230 metres.

As its common name suggests, the species can be recognised by dark spots on its fins. It grows to a maximum of around 33 cm in length.

Cyclopsetta fimbriata is a game fish of minor commercial importance.
