= C. spilopterus =

C. spilopterus may refer to:

- Centropus spilopterus, a cuckoo species
- Citharichthys spilopterus, a flatfish species
