= Citharichthys gilberti =

Conservation status
- Least Concern (IUCN 3.1)

Scientific classification
- Kingdom: Animalia
- Phylum: Chordata
- Class: Actinopterygii
- Order: Carangiformes
- Suborder: Pleuronectoidei
- Family: Cyclopsettidae
- Genus: Citharichthys
- Species: C. gilberti

Binomial name
- Citharichthys gilberti O. P. Jenkins & Evermann, 1889

Species of fish

Citharichthys gilberti, the bigmouth sanddab, is a species of flatfish in the large-tooth flounder family Paralichthyidae. It is native to the eastern Pacific Ocean, in tropical waters ranging from the Gulf of California in the north to Peru in the south. It occurs in shallow waters off the coast, to a maximum depth of 36 m (118 ft).

This demersal fish inhabits the soft bottoms of trawling grounds and bays. It is commonly found in estuaries and can also venture into freshwater.

Like the rest of the large-tooth flounders, it has both eyes on the left side of its head. It grows to a maximum length of 27 cm (11 in). Citharichthys gilberti is a predator, feeding on large benthic organisms and small fish. It is a commercial fish of minor importance.
