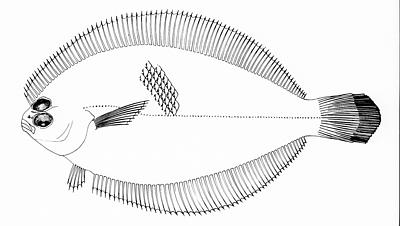

Scientific classification
- Kingdom: Animalia
- Phylum: Chordata
- Class: Actinopterygii
- Order: Carangiformes
- Suborder: Pleuronectoidei
- Family: Cyclopsettidae
- Genus: Etropus
- Species: E. microstomus

Binomial name
- Etropus microstomus (Gill, 1864)

Synonyms
- Citharichthys microstomus Gill, 1864

= Etropus microstomus =

Species of fish

Etropus microstomus, the smallmouth flounder, is a species of fish belonging to the family Cyclopsettidae.

== Appearance ==
The smallmouth flounder is a lefteyed flatfish, and is therefore very thin when lying on its side. Its mouth and eyes lie on the same side of its body, and are small compared to the rest of its head, and the lateral line has approximately 41 to 45 scales. The left pelvic fin lies below the lateral line, about one quarter down its body. The smallmouth flounder has 13 rakers on its first gill arch. It is usually colored olive brownish with a white blind side, and it can grow up to 5 inches long.

== Occurrence ==
The species ranges from New York to Virginia, and has occasionally been seen farther south.
