= WIFL =

WIFL may refer to:

- World Indoor Football League (1988), a league that was to begin in 1988
- World Indoor Football League (2007), a league that played one season in 2007
- WIFL-LP, a low-power radio station (104.5 FM) licensed to serve Weirsdale, Florida, United States
- WXZC, a radio station (104.3 FM) licensed to serve Inglis, Florida, which held the call sign WIFL from 2000 to 2010

== See also ==
- WFL (disambiguation)
- Wiffle (disambiguation)
