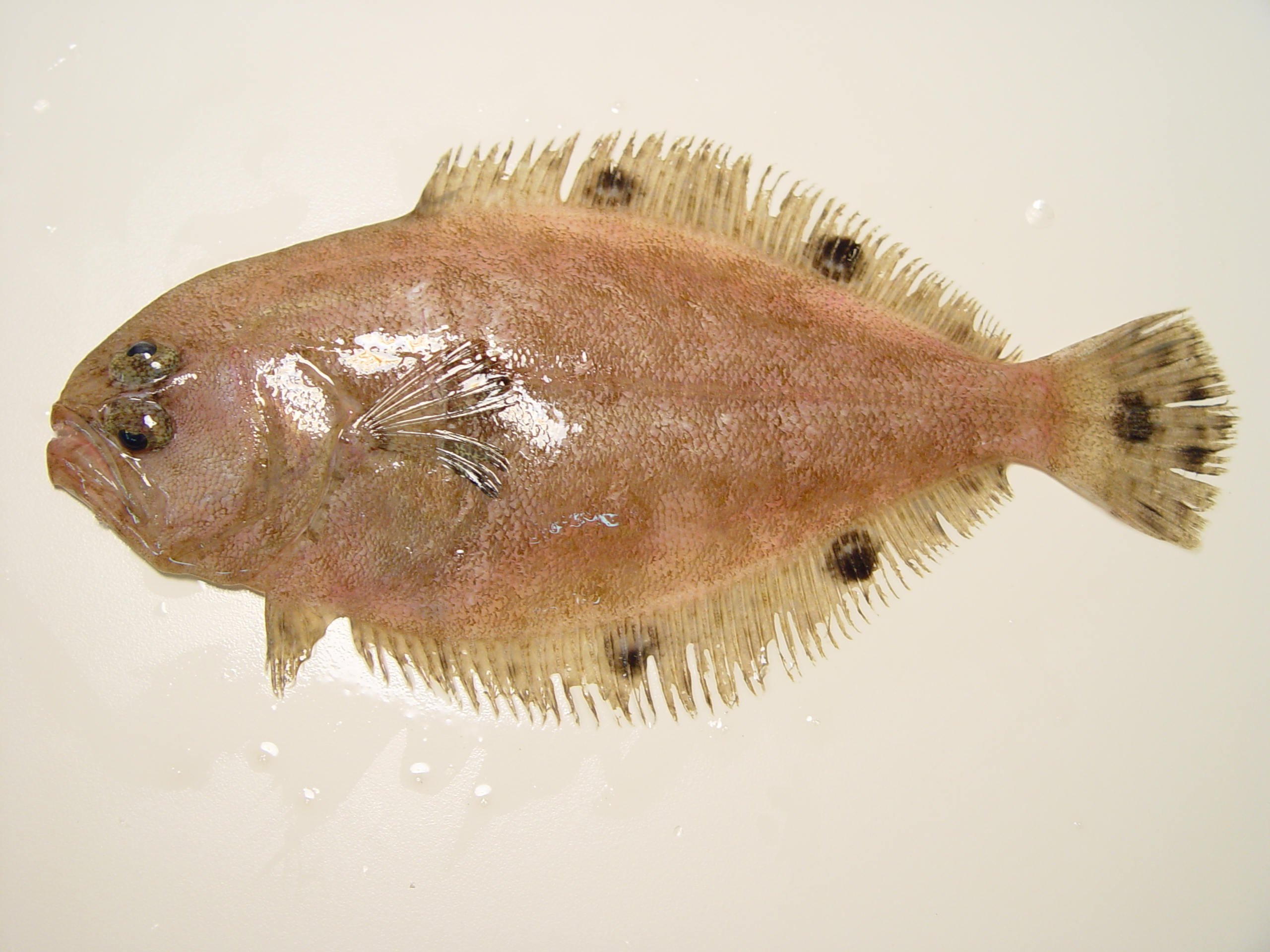
- Spotfin Flounder (C. fimbriata)
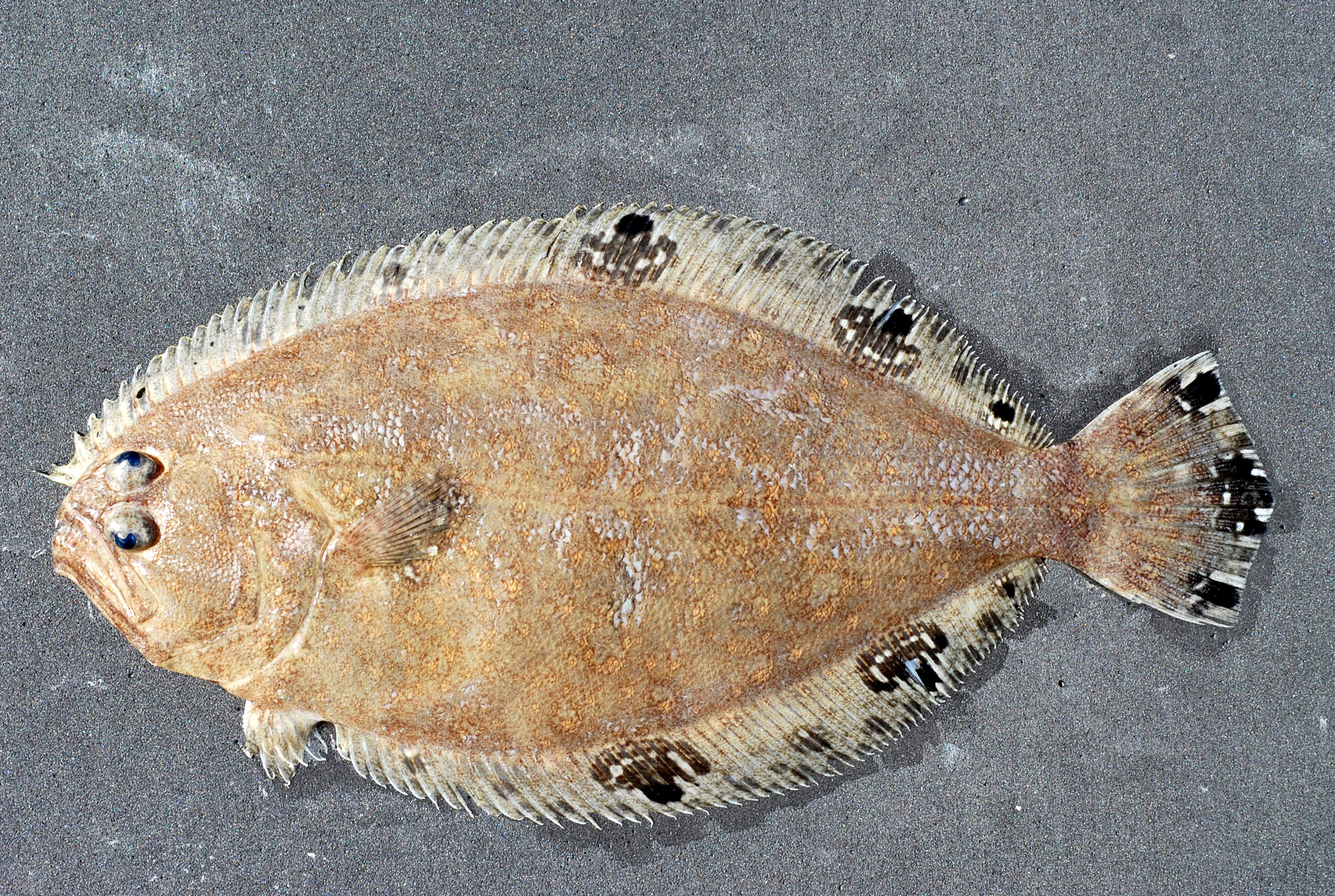
- Mexican Flounder (C. chittendeni)

Scientific classification
- Kingdom: Animalia
- Phylum: Chordata
- Class: Actinopterygii
- Order: Carangiformes
- Suborder: Pleuronectoidei
- Family: Cyclopsettidae
- Genus: Cyclopsetta; T. N. Gill, 1889

Type species
- Hemirhombus fimbriatus Goode & Bean, 1885

Synonyms
- Azevia Jordan, 1889; Dorsopsetta Nielsen, 1963

= Cyclopsetta =

Genus of fishes

Cyclopsetta is a genus of large-tooth flounders native to the coastal waters of the Americas.

== Species ==
There are currently four recognized species in this genus:

- Cyclopsetta chittendeni B. A. Bean, 1895 (Mexican flounder)
- Cyclopsetta fimbriata (Goode & T. H. Bean, 1885) (Spotfin flounder)
- Cyclopsetta panamensis (Steindachner, 1876) (God's flounder)
- Cyclopsetta querna (D. S. Jordan & Bollman, 1890) (Toothed flounder)
