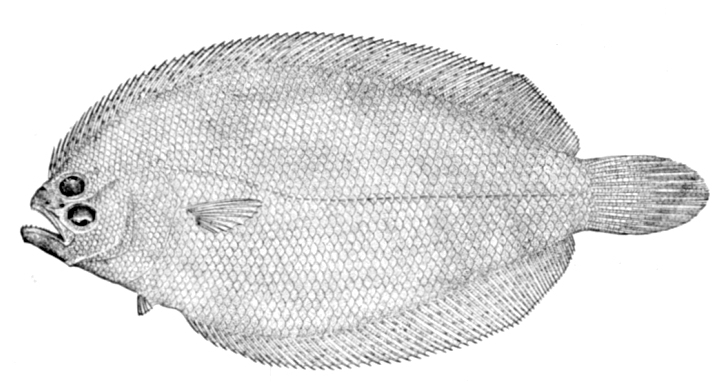

Conservation status
- Least Concern (IUCN 3.1)

Scientific classification
- Kingdom: Animalia
- Phylum: Chordata
- Class: Actinopterygii
- Division: Teleostei
- Order: Carangiformes
- Suborder: Pleuronectoidei
- Family: Cyclopsettidae
- Genus: Citharichthys
- Species: C. spilopterus

Binomial name
- Citharichthys spilopterus Günther, 1862

= Bay whiff =

Species of fish

The bay whiff (Citharichthys spilopterus) is part of the family Paralichthyidae. This family is known as "left-eye flounders". They are one of the most common flatfish of the Gulf of Mexico. They are benthic ambush predators with the ability to camouflage themselves on or just below the surface. They are often solitary animals with few individuals. They vary in color from light to dark in life and are brownish in color after death. They have two dark spots on the caudal peduncle and a light spot under the pectoral fin. The average size of the Bay whiff is 15 cm and the maximum recorded length is 20 cm. The lateral line is straight along the body. It has a large mouth. The opercle on the blind side has no cirri. Their pelvic fins are also asymmetrical.

== Diet ==
Not much is known about its feeding habits but what is known is that they feed mainly on zooplankton and zoobenthos. Cannibalism has been reported among smaller juveniles.

== Habitat ==
The bay whiff lives along the bottom of coastal waters in depths from forty fathoms to twenty fathoms. They have a high salinity tolerance and have been found near freshwater areas as low as 0.9 psu to coastal waters exceeding 35 psu.

== Reproduction and life cycle ==
Spawning season for C. spilopterus vary with location. Water temperature is a main reason for this reason for this variation. Populations in Brazil spawn from March to May and November, the North Carolina season is restricted to February and March, and Puerto Rico fishes spawn from November to May, and the peak of spawning occurs in both winter and spring in Louisiana. In Florida, the large presence of juveniles in May suggests a spring spawning season.

== Distribution ==
They are found throughout the western Atlantic from New Jersey through the Caribbean to Brazil. They are distributed throughout the Gulf of Mexico and move into the bays and shallow waters during the warmer months of the year.

== Other species mistaken for the bay whiff ==
Three similarly-sized species of Citharichthys have been found and are similar to the bay whiff. The Gulf Stream flounder, C. arctifrons; the sand whiff, C. arenaceus; and the spotted whiff, C. macrops.
