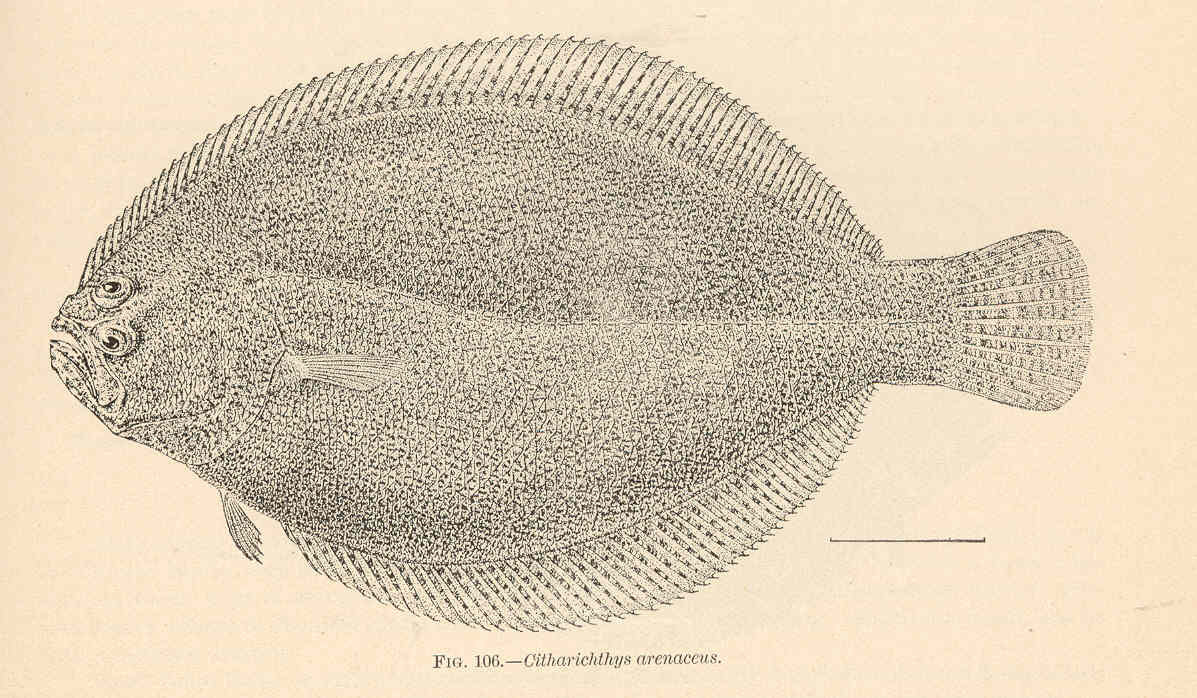

Conservation status
- Least Concern (IUCN 3.1)

Scientific classification
- Kingdom: Animalia
- Phylum: Chordata
- Class: Actinopterygii
- Order: Carangiformes
- Suborder: Pleuronectoidei
- Family: Cyclopsettidae
- Genus: Citharichthys
- Species: C. arenaceus

Binomial name
- Citharichthys arenaceus Evermann & M. C. Marsh, 1900

= Citharichthys arenaceus =

Species of fish

Citharichthys arenaceus, the sand whiff, is a species of flatfish in the large-tooth flounder family Paralichthyidae. This demersal marine fish inhabits the western Atlantic Ocean, occurring in shallow tropical coastal waters, as well as in estuaries, bays, and lagoons. It ranges from Florida, United States, in the north to the West Indies and Brazil in the south.

Like the rest of the large-tooth flounders, it has both eyes on the left side of its head. It grows to a maximum length of 20 cm (7.9 in).
