= WFL =

WFL may refer to:

== Football ==
- Western Football League, an English football league
- Wilmington Football League, an American football league that played from 1929 to 1955
- Wimmera Football League, an Australian football league
- World Football League, an American football league that played in 1974 and 1975

== Other ==
- Waterfall railway station, Sydney, Australia, by Sydney Trains station code
- WFL Drum Company, founded by William F. Ludwig, Sr., and precursor to Ludwig Drums
- Wiedemann–Franz law relating electrical to thermal conductivity of metals
- Win for Life, a type of American lottery
- Women's Freedom League, a British organisation that campaigned for women's suffrage and sexual equality
- Work Flow Language, the process control language for the Burroughs large systems
- WWE Fastlane, a series of professional wrestling pay-per-view events
- "WFL" or "Wrote for Luck", a song by Happy Mondays on the 1988 album Bummed

== See also ==
- WIFL (disambiguation)
- Wiffle (disambiguation)
