= WAFL =

WAFL may refer to:

== Sport ==
- West Australian Football League, an Australian rules football league in Western Australia
- Wellington Australian Football League, an Australian rules football competition in Wellington, New Zealand
- Women's American Football League, a women's American football league

== Other uses ==
- Write Anywhere File Layout, a file system designed by NetApp
- WAFL (FM), a radio station licensed to Milford, Delaware
- Workshop on Altaic Formal Linguistics, a linguistics conference
- WAFL, the ICAO airport code for Sultan Bantilan Airport, Sulawesi Island, Indonesia

== See also ==
- Waffle (disambiguation)
