= Citharichthys mariajorisae =

Conservation status
- Least Concern (IUCN 3.1)

Scientific classification
- Domain: Eukaryota
- Kingdom: Animalia
- Phylum: Chordata
- Class: Actinopterygii
- Order: Carangiformes
- Suborder: Pleuronectoidei
- Family: Paralichthyidae
- Genus: Citharichthys
- Species: C. mariajorisae

Binomial name
- Citharichthys mariajorisae van der Heiden & Mussot-Pérez, 1995

Species of fish

Citharichthys mariajorisae, the five-rayed sanddab, is a species of flatfish in the large-tooth flounder family Paralichthyidae. It is native to the eastern Pacific Ocean, in tropical waters ranging from the Gulf of California in the north to the Bay of Panama in the south. It is a demersal marine fish, inhabiting the sandy bottoms of shallow coastal waters at a depth between 10 and 45 metres (33 and 148 ft).

Like the rest of the large-tooth flounders, it has both eyes on the left side of its head. It grows to a maximum length of 12.4 centimetres (4.9 in). It is brownish or grey in color, mottled with darker patches. Its common name is derived from five or six pelvic-fin rays on the ocular side.

Citharichthys mariajorisae is a predator, feeding on benthic worms and crustaceans, as well as small fish.
