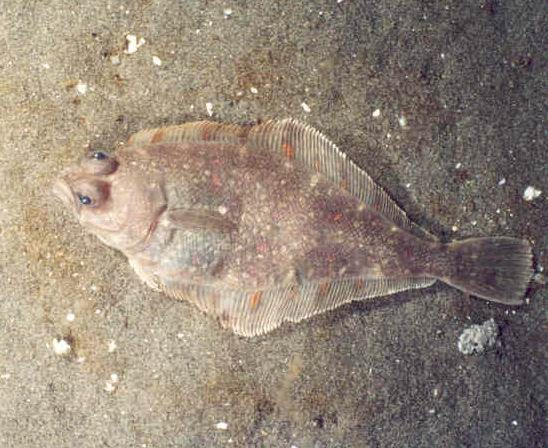

Conservation status
- Least Concern (IUCN 3.1)

Scientific classification
- Kingdom: Animalia
- Phylum: Chordata
- Class: Actinopterygii
- Order: Carangiformes
- Suborder: Pleuronectoidei
- Family: Cyclopsettidae
- Genus: Citharichthys
- Species: C. sordidus

Binomial name
- Citharichthys sordidus (Girard, 1854)

Synonyms
- Psettichthys sordidus Girard, 1854

= Pacific sanddab =

Species of fish

The Pacific sanddab (Citharichthys sordidus), also known as the soft flounder, mottle sanddab, or megrim, is a fish species in the order Pleuronectiformes, or flatfish. It is by far the most common sanddab, and it shares its habitat with the longfin sanddab (C. xanthostigma) and the speckled sanddab (C. stigmaeus). The adult Pacific sanddab is bilaterally asymmetrical and 'left-eyed', meaning both eyes are located on the left side of its body.

It is a medium-sized flatfish, with a light brown color mottled brown or black on its eyed side, occasionally with white or orange spots. On its blind side, it is a solid white or light brown. It has large eyes and scales, and a deep rounded body.

== Distribution ==
The Pacific sanddab is endemic to the East Pacific Ocean, from the Bering Sea to Baja California. They are most commonly found at depths of 50 to 150 m (160 to 490 ft), though the young inhabit shallower waters, occasionally moving into tide pools.

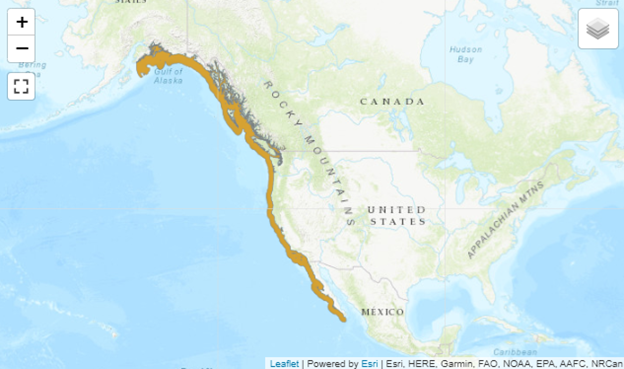
A map of Pacific sanddab distribution, shading indicating that it is found along the coast of Alaska down to Baja California.

== Biology ==
The Pacific sanddab is an opportunistic predator, feeding on a variety of crustaceans, as well as smaller fish, squid, and octopuses. Their diet has been known to include anchovies, fish eggs, sea squirts, shrimp, crabs, and marine worms.

Due to their abundance in coastal ecosystems, Pacific sanddabs have an important ecological role, providing food for various predators such as marine mammals, birds, and fish. They comprise a significant part of some breeding seabird diets, such as the Brandt's cormorant and Pigeon guillemot, the latter of which may be considered a sanddab specialist. Fish predators include salmon, skates, lingcod, Pacific sablefish and larger flatfish.

Like all flatfish, the Pacific sanddab begins life as a bilaterally symmetrical fish larva, a stage which lasts for up to 271 days. As the larva matures, its right eye migrates over its head to the left side of its body. During this process, it shifts from a pelagic to a benthic lifestyle and begins to exhibit its characteristic side-swimming behavior. The fish also undergoes changes to its circulatory, nervous, and musculoskeletal system during this process.

Their unique eye placement is an adaptation which makes them suitable for this bottom-dwelling lifestyle, allowing them to use both eyes for detection while buried or laying along the sea floor. Additionally, by swimming close to the bottom, the Pacific sanddab and other flatfishes are able to move more efficiently and conserve energy using the ground effect. They also take advantage of the substrate at the bottom by burying themselves to hide from predators, a behavior that is facilitated through their flattened body shape.

The Pacific sanddab exhibits sexual dimorphism, with adult females growing to a larger size than males.

The Pacific sanddab is oviparous and can reproduce multiple times in one spawning season. The spawning season takes place from July through September or October off the coast of Southern and Central California. Populations at higher latitudes show a shift in spawning season; in Puget Sound off the coast of Washington spawning occurs from February to May.

== Conservation ==
The Pacific sanddab is currently classified as a species of least concern by the IUCN.

It is a popular game fish in northern California, found on menus in the Monterey Bay and San Francisco area, though more difficult to find in southern California restaurants and markets. Usually sold frozen, some regard it as a delicacy. It is also popular in restaurants and stores along the coasts of Oregon and Washington, where it can be found more readily.

As Pacific sanddabs have a rapid growth rate coupled with early maturation, their vulnerability to overfishing is believed to be relatively low. However, females appear to be maturing at significantly smaller sizes when comparing data from 2016 to data from 1951. This decrease in size of mature females is most likely due to commercial fishing activity, although there is evidence that warmer ocean temperatures have contributed to similar decreasing size trends in other groundfish such as haddock and North Sea plaice. Larger females tend to produce a higher quantity and quality of offspring, thus this increase in proportion of smaller mature females may have a negative impact on the species population.
