= Waffle (disambiguation) =

A waffle is a batter- or dough-based cake cooked in a waffle iron.

Waffle(s) may also refer to:

== Arts ==
- "Waffle" (song), a 2000 song by Sevendust
- "Waffle", a 1995 song by Sunny Day Real Estate from Sunny Day Real Estate
- Waffle (Catscratch), a character on Catscratch
- Ilya Ilych Telegin or Waffles, a character in Anton Chekhov's Uncle Vanya

== Science and technology ==
- Waffle (bbs), a bulletin board service software program
- Waffles (machine learning), an open source collection of machine learning algorithms and tools
- Waffles (John Kerry), a Google bomb created during the 2004 US presidential election

== Other uses ==
- Waffle (game show), a British game show
- Waffle the Wonder Dog, a British television show
- The Waffle, a Canadian political movement
- Waffle (speech), speech that involves equivocating or blathering
- Waffles (episode), the 39th episode of the first season of Teen Titans Go! and the 39th overall episode of the series.
- Waffles, the main character in Waffles + Mochi.

== See also ==
- Potato waffle, a potato-based food shaped like a waffle
- Waffle button, a user interface element
- Waffle House, a franchised restaurant chain in the United States
- Waffle iron
- Waffle fabric, absorbent cotton cloth woven with a permanent waffle structure
- Waffle slab, a type of concrete slab
- WAFL (disambiguation)
