= Citharichthys gymnorhinus =

Conservation status
- Least Concern (IUCN 3.1)

Scientific classification
- Kingdom: Animalia
- Phylum: Chordata
- Class: Actinopterygii
- Order: Carangiformes
- Suborder: Pleuronectoidei
- Family: Cyclopsettidae
- Genus: Citharichthys
- Species: C. gymnorhinus

Binomial name
- Citharichthys gymnorhinus Gutherz & Blackman, 1970

Species of fish

Citharichthys gymnorhinus, the anglefin whiff, is a species of flatfish in the large-tooth flounder family Paralichthyidae. It is a demersal marine fish that inhabits the mid to outer continental shelf of the western Atlantic Ocean, in both tropical and subtropical waters. It ranges from the Bahamas and Florida in the north to Guyana and Nicaragua in the south, though larvae samples have also been collected off the coast of Canada. It occurs at depths between 35 and 200 metres (115 and 656 ft), but is most commonly found in shallower waters.

Like the rest of the large-tooth flounders, it has both eyes on the left side of its head. It is one of the smallest members of its genus and one of the smallest flatfishes, growing to a maximum length of 7.5 centimetres (3.0 in). As a result, it is of no commercial importance. It is similar in size and appearance to Citharichthys cornutus and it shares the same habitat.
