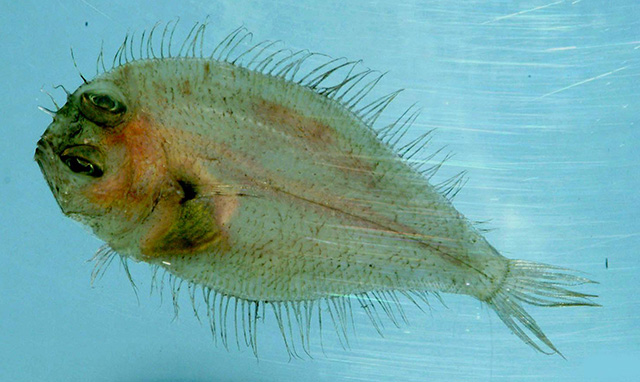

Conservation status
- Least Concern (IUCN 3.1)

Scientific classification
- Kingdom: Animalia
- Phylum: Chordata
- Class: Actinopterygii
- Order: Carangiformes
- Suborder: Pleuronectoidei
- Family: Cyclopsettidae
- Genus: Citharichthys
- Species: C. cornutus

Binomial name
- Citharichthys cornutus Günther, 1880

Synonyms
- Romboidichthys cornutus Günther, 1880

= Citharichthys cornutus =

Species of fish

Citharichthys cornutus, the horned whiff, is a species of flatfish in the large-tooth flounder family Paralichthyidae. This bathydemersal marine fish inhabits the continental shelves of the western Atlantic Ocean, in both tropical and subtropical waters. It ranges from New Jersey in the north to Uruguay in the south, though larvae samples have also been collected off the coast of Canada. It occurs at depths between 30 and 400 metres (98 and 1,312 ft), though it is usually found in deeper waters.

Like the rest of the large-tooth flounders, it has both eyes on the left side of its head. It grows to a maximum length of 9.1 cm (3.6 in). It is similar in appearance to C. gymnorhinus and C. amblybregmatus, both of which are sympatric species. All three species display sexual dimorphism, with the males displaying several secondary sex characteristics.

Due to its diminutive size and the abundance of larger flatfishes, it is of no commercial importance, and is rarely collected. As a result, the fishes' morphology and ecology is known only from a limited number of collected samples.
