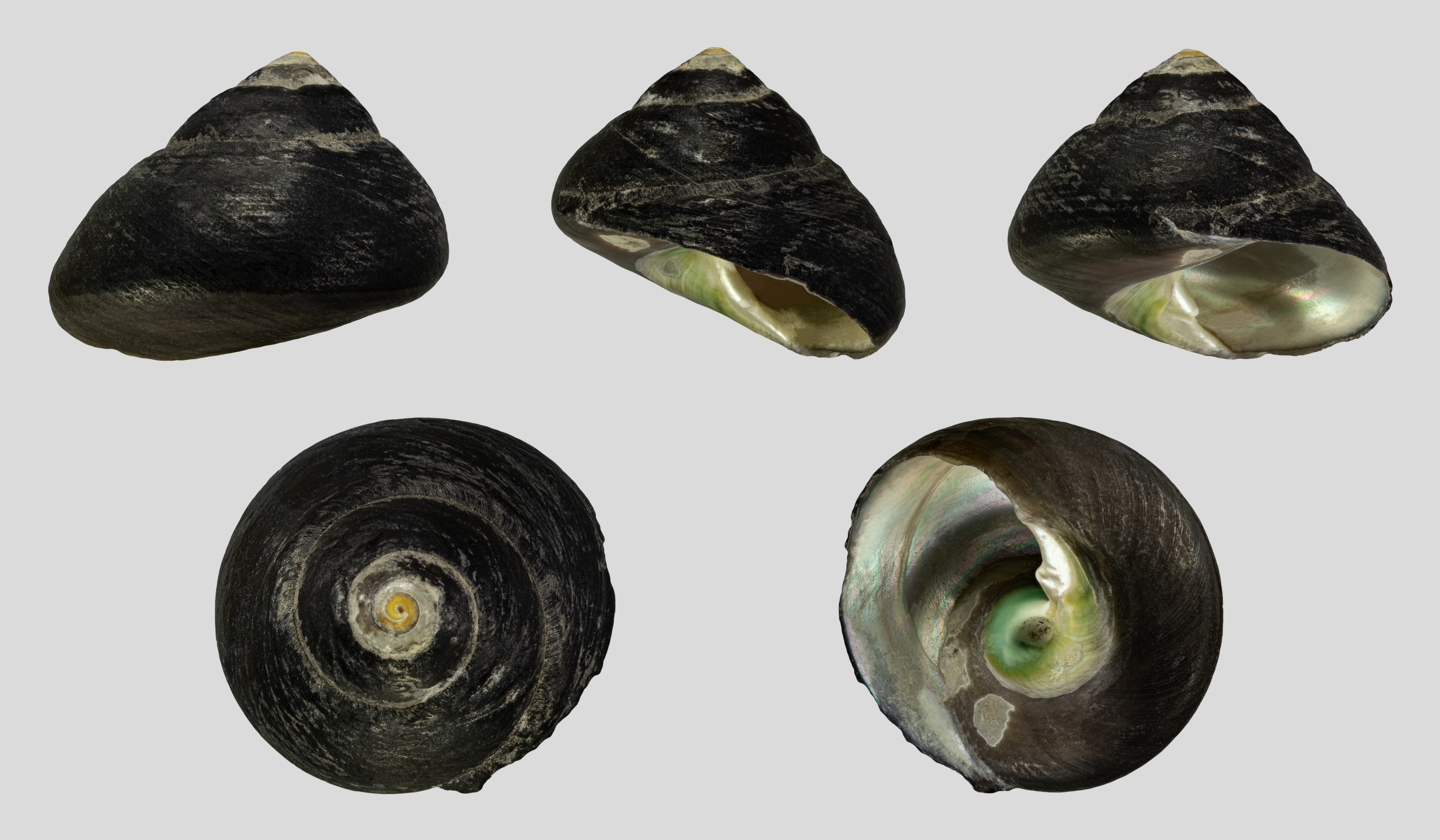
- Tegula xanthostigma

Scientific classification
- Kingdom: Animalia
- Phylum: Mollusca
- Class: Gastropoda
- Subclass: Vetigastropoda
- Order: Trochida
- Superfamily: Trochoidea
- Family: Tegulidae
- Genus: Tegula
- Species: T. xanthostigma

Binomial name
- Tegula xanthostigma (A. Adams, 1853)

Synonyms
- Chlorostoma xanthostigma A. Adams, 1853 (original combination); Chlorostoma nigricolor Dunker, R.W., 1860; Tegula (Chlorostoma) xanthostigma (A. Adams, 1853)

= Tegula xanthostigma =

Species of gastropod

Tegula xanthostigma is a species of sea snail, a marine gastropod mollusk in the family Tegulidae.

== Description ==
The size of the shell attains 35 mm. T. xanthostigma has a smooth dark shell surface with a bright green underside. The darkness of its shell depends on relation to the coast, with lighter brown snails associated with sheltered sites compared to those with black shells.

== Distribution ==
This marine species is found in Korea, Taiwan, Japan, and Vietnam. T. xanthostigma typically reside in exposed rocky shores and sheltered areas such as Kagoshima Bay and in the Seto Inland Sea.
