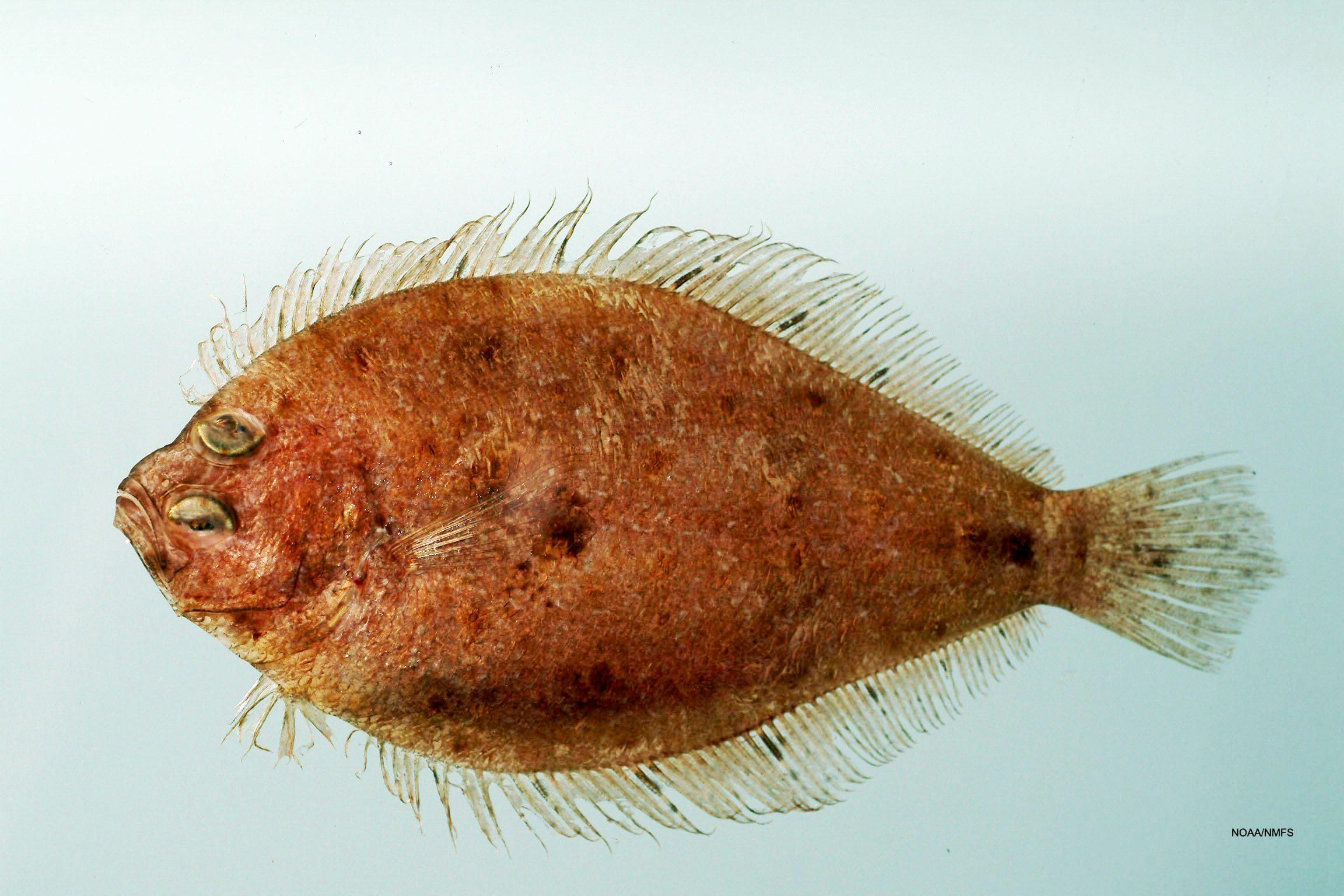
- Shoal Flounder (S. gunteri)
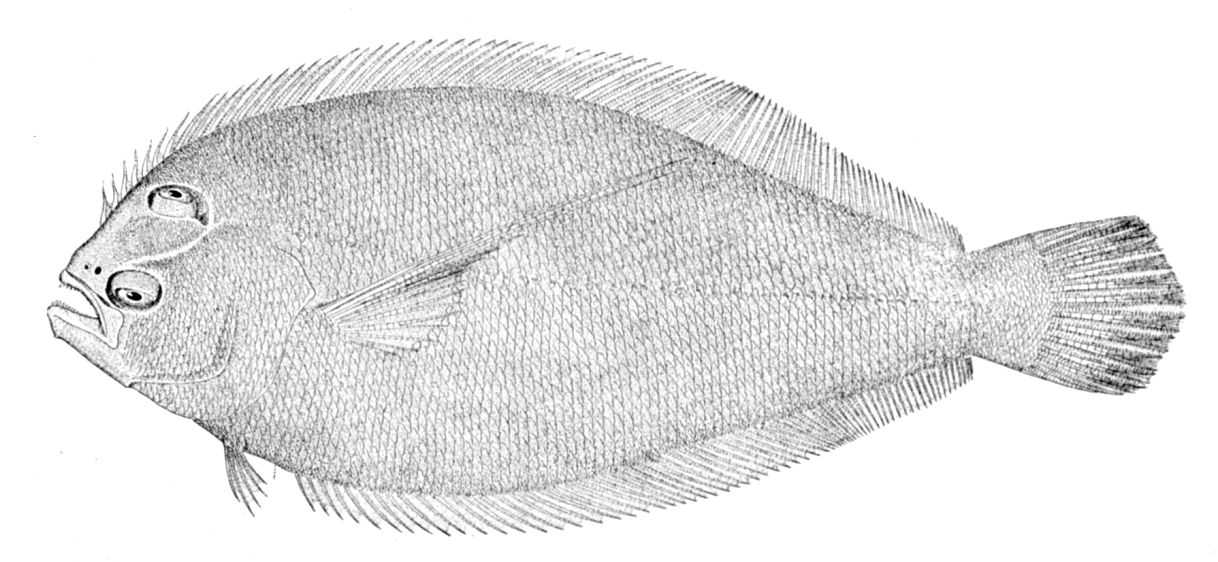
- Dusky Flounder (S. papillosum)

Scientific classification
- Domain: Eukaryota
- Kingdom: Animalia
- Phylum: Chordata
- Class: Actinopterygii
- Order: Carangiformes
- Suborder: Pleuronectoidei
- Family: Paralichthyidae
- Genus: Syacium; Ranzani, 1842

Type species
- Syacium micrurum Ranzani, 1842

Synonyms
- Armaca Jordan & Goss, 1885; Hemirhombus Bleeker, 1862

= Syacium =

Genus of fishes

Syacium is a genus of large-tooth flounders found in the Atlantic and Pacific Oceans. With the exception of S. guineensis from the Atlantic coast of Africa, all species are from the Americas. The largest species in the genus reaches 40 cm (16 in) in length.

== Species ==
There are currently eight recognized species in this genus:

- Syacium guineensis (Bleeker, 1862) (Papillose flounder)
- Syacium gunteri Ginsburg, 1933 (Shoal flounder)
- Syacium latifrons (D. S. Jordan & C. H. Gilbert, 1882) (Beach flounder)
- Syacium longidorsale Murakami & Amaoka, 1992 (Longfin flounder)
- Syacium maculiferum (Garman, 1899) (Clearspot flounder)
- Syacium micrurum Ranzani, 1842 (Channel flounder)
- Syacium ovale (Günther, 1864) (Oval flounder)
- Syacium papillosum (Linnaeus, 1758) (Dusky flounder)
