= Citharichthys abbotti =

Conservation status
- Least Concern (IUCN 3.1)

Scientific classification
- Kingdom: Animalia
- Phylum: Chordata
- Class: Actinopterygii
- Order: Carangiformes
- Suborder: Pleuronectoidei
- Family: Cyclopsettidae
- Genus: Citharichthys
- Species: C. abbotti

Binomial name
- Citharichthys abbotti C. E. Dawson, 1969

Species of fish

Citharichthys abbotti, the Veracruz whiff, is a species of flatfish in the large-tooth flounder family Paralichthyidae. It is endemic to the southwestern Gulf of Mexico, found on the Eastern Mexico Continental Shelf, with Veracruz to the south and the Rio Grande to the north.

It is a demersal fish that inhabits tropical waters. Like the rest of the large-tooth flounders, it has both eyes on the left side of its head.
