= Citharichthys xanthostigma =

Scientific classification
- Domain: Eukaryota
- Kingdom: Animalia
- Phylum: Chordata
- Class: Actinopterygii
- Order: Carangiformes
- Suborder: Pleuronectoidei
- Family: Paralichthyidae
- Genus: Citharichthys
- Species: C. xanthostigma

Binomial name
- Citharichthys xanthostigma C. H. Gilbert, 1890

Species of fish

Citharichthys xanthostigma, the longfin sanddab, is a species of flatfish in the large-tooth flounder family Paralichthyidae. It is native to the eastern Pacific Ocean, in subtropical waters ranging from Monterey Bay, California in the north, to Costa Rica in the south. It is a demersal marine fish, and can be found on the soft bottoms of coastal waters at depths between 2 and 201 metres (6.6 and 659.4 ft).

Like the rest of the large-tooth flounders, it has both eyes on the left side of its head. It grows to a maximum length of 25 centimetres (9.8 in). It is brown-colored, with white and orange speckles. Citharichthys xanthostigma is a predator, feeding on benthic worms and crustaceans.

It shares its habitat with the larger Pacific sanddab (C. sordidus), and is a game fish of minor commercial importance.
