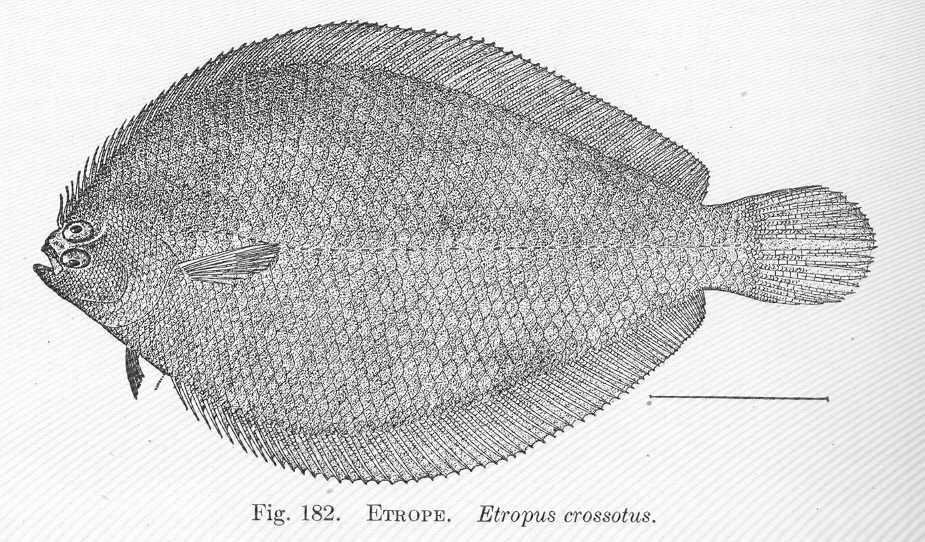
- Etropus crossotus

Scientific classification
- Kingdom: Animalia
- Phylum: Chordata
- Class: Actinopterygii
- Order: Carangiformes
- Suborder: Pleuronectoidei
- Family: Paralichthyidae
- Genus: Etropus; D. S. Jordan & C. H. Gilbert, 1882

Type species
- Etropus crossotus Jordan & Gilbert, 1882

= Etropus =

Genus of fishes

Etropus is a genus of large-tooth flounders native to the coastal waters of the Americas.

== Species ==
There are currently nine recognized species in this genus:

- Etropus ciadi van der Heiden & Plascencia González, 2005
- Etropus crossotus D. S. Jordan & C. H. Gilbert, 1882 (Fringed flounder)
- Etropus cyclosquamus Leslie & D. J. Stewart, 1986 (Shelf flounder)
- Etropus delsmani Chabanaud, 1940
  - Etropus delsmani delsmani Chabanaud, 1940
  - Etropus delsmani pacificus J. G. Nielsen, 1963 (Delsman's flounder)
- Etropus ectenes D. S. Jordan, 1889 (Sole flounder)
- Etropus longimanus Norman, 1933
- Etropus microstomus (T. N. Gill, 1864) (Smallmouth flounder)
- Etropus peruvianus Hildebrand, 1946 (Peruvian flounder)
- Etropus rimosus Goode & T. H. Bean, 1885 (Gray flounder)
