= WIFF =

WIFF or wiff may refer to:

== People ==
- Biff Wiff (1956–2025), American actor
- Donald Ray Wiff, an American physicist
- Bill Hunt (alpine skier), also known as Wiff Hunt

== Radio ==
- WIFF (FM), a radio station (90.1 FM) licensed to serve Windsor, New York, United States
- WGBJ, a radio station (102.3 FM ) licensed to serve Auburn, Indiana, United States, which held the call sign WIFF-FM from 1967 to 1995
- WGLL, a radio station (1570 AM) licensed to serve Auburn, which held the call sign WIFF from 1967 until 1997

== Other ==
- Wiff, to strike-out, the name origin for the sport of Wiffle ball
- Walthamstow International Film Festival
- Windsor International Film Festival
- .wiff, a file format used by Analyst mass spectrometry software

== See also ==
- Whiff (disambiguation)
- wiff-waff, a nickname for ping-pong
