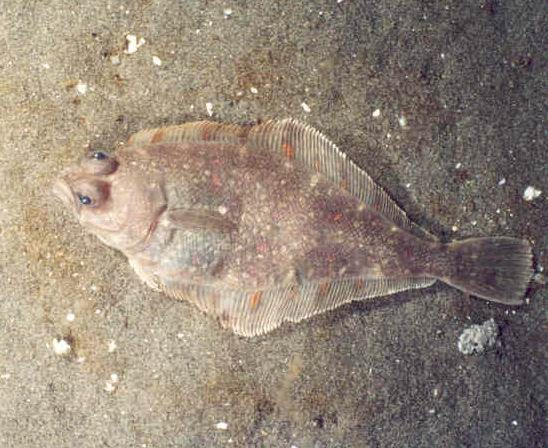
- Pacific sanddab, Citharichthys sordidus

Scientific classification
- Domain: Eukaryota
- Kingdom: Animalia
- Phylum: Chordata
- Class: Actinopterygii
- Order: Carangiformes
- Suborder: Pleuronectoidei
- Family: Paralichthyidae
- Genus: Citharichthys; Bleeker, 1862

Type species
- Citharichthys cayennensis Bleeker, 1862

Synonyms
- Metoponops Gill, 1864; Neoetropus Hildebrand & Schroeder, 1928; Orthopsetta Gill, 1862

= Citharichthys =

Citharichthys Temporal range: 20–0 Ma Late Miocene to Present

Genus of fishes

Citharichthys is a genus of flatfish in the large-tooth flounder family, Paralichthyidae. They have both eyes on the left sides of their heads. They are native to the oceans around the Americas, with a single species, C. stampflii off the West African coast. Most are found in relatively shallow depths, but the genus also includes species found in deep water (down to at least 2,000 m or 6,600 ft) and species that enter fresh water.

Various species known as sanddab, whiff, and flounder are in this genus, and the most common species is the Pacific sanddab, Citharichthys sordidus. They are a dull light-brown, and are mottled with brown or black, sometimes with yellow or orange. The largest species reaches 41 cm (16 in) in length.

== Species ==
The currently recognized species in this genus are:

- Citharichthys abbotti C. E. Dawson, 1969 (Veracruz whiff)
- Citharichthys amblybregmatus Gutherz & Blackman, 1970
- Citharichthys arctifrons Goode, 1880 (Gulf Stream flounder)
- Citharichthys arenaceus Evermann & M. C. Marsh, 1900 (sand whiff)
- Citharichthys cornutus (Günther, 1880) (horned whiff)
- Citharichthys darwini Victor & Wellington, 2013 (Darwin's sanddab)
- Citharichthys dinoceros Goode & T. H. Bean, 1886 (spined whiff)
- Citharichthys fragilis C. H. Gilbert, 1890 (Gulf sanddab)
- Citharichthys gilberti O. P. Jenkins & Evermann, 1889 (bigmouth sanddab)
- Citharichthys gnathus Hoshino & Amaoka, 1999
- Citharichthys gordae Beebe & Tee-Van, 1938 (mimic sanddab)
- Citharichthys gymnorhinus Gutherz & Blackman, 1970 (anglefin whiff)
- Citharichthys macrops Dresel, 1885 (spotted whiff)
- Citharichthys mariajorisae van der Heiden & Mussot-Pérez, 1995 (five-rayed sanddab)
- Citharichthys minutus Cervigón, 1982
- Citharichthys platophrys C. H. Gilbert, 1891 (small sanddab)
- Citharichthys sordidus (Girard, 1854) (Pacific sanddab)
- Citharichthys spilopterus Günther, 1862 (bay whiff)
- Citharichthys stampflii (Steindachner, 1894) (smooth flounder)
- Citharichthys stigmaeus D. S. Jordan & C. H. Gilbert, 1882 (speckled sanddab)
- Citharichthys surinamensis (Bloch & J. G. Schneider, 1801)
- Citharichthys uhleri D. S. Jorda], 1889 (voodoo whiff)
- Citharichthys valdezi Cervigón, 1986
- Citharichthys xanthostigma C. H. Gilbert, 1890 (longfin sanddab)
