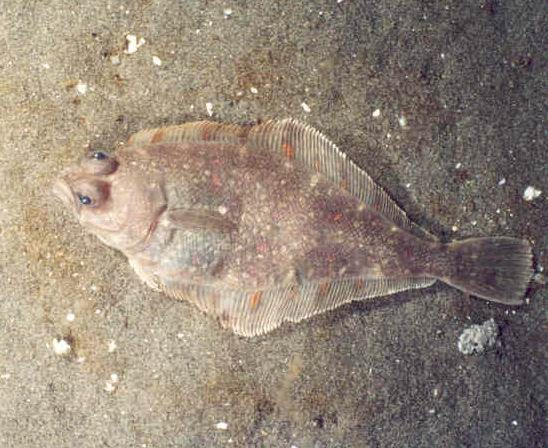
- Pacific sanddab, Citharichthys sordidus

Scientific classification
- Kingdom: Animalia
- Phylum: Chordata
- Class: Actinopterygii
- Order: Carangiformes
- Suborder: Pleuronectoidei
- Family: Cyclopsettidae; Campbell, Chanet, Chen, Lee & Chen, 2019

Genera
- Citharichthys; Cyclopsetta; Etropus; Syacium

= Cyclopsettidae =

Cyclopsettidae Temporal range: Late Eocene–present

Family of fishes

Cyclopsettidae is a family of flatfish primarily native to the coastlines of the Americas, with a few species found off the western coast of Africa. Members of this family were previously placed in Paralichthyidae until a 2019 study, which found this placement to be paraphyletic, and described a new family for them. The closest relatives of the Cyclopsettidae are thought to be the Bothidae, based on both genetic and morphological data.

The following genera are placed in this family:

- Citharichthys Bleeker, 1862
- Cyclopsetta Gill, 1889
- Etropus Jordan & Gilbert, 1882
- Syacium Ranzani, 1842

Several species are important commercial and game fishes, such as the Pacific sanddab, Citharichthys sordidus.

The earliest known fossil remains of the Cyclopsettidae are Late Eocene-aged fossil otoliths assigned to Citharichthys altissimus from Louisiana, USA.
